= Kraslice (administrative district) =

Administrative district in the Czech Republic

Administrative district of the municipality with extended powers of Kraslice Správní obvod obce s rozšířenou působností Kraslice
- Administrative district of municipality with extended powers
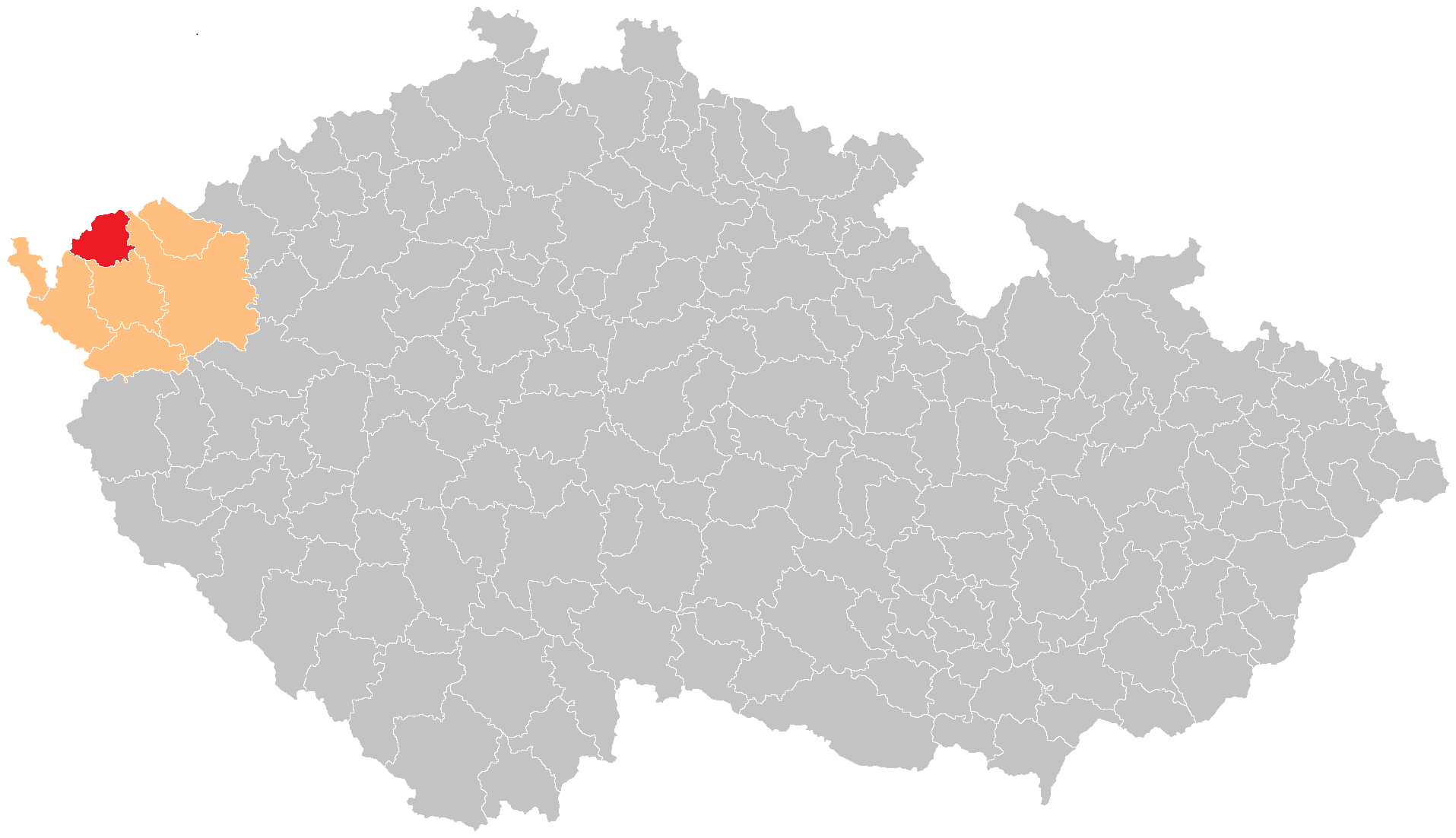
- Location in the Karlovy Vary Region within the Czech Republic
- Coordinates: 50°19′N 12°32′E
- Country: Czech Republic
- Region: Karlovy Vary
- District: Karlovy Vary
- Municipality with extended powers: Kraslice

Area
  - Total: 264.54 km^{2} (102.14 sq mi)

Population (2024)
  - Total: 12,757
  - Density: 48.223/km^{2} (124.90/sq mi)
- Time zone: UTC+1 (CET)
  - Summer (DST): UTC+2 (CEST)
- Municipalities: 8
- * Cities and towns: 4
- * Market towns: 0

The administrative district of the municipality with extended powers of Kraslice (abbreviated AD MEP Kraslice; Czech: Správní obvod obce s rozšířenou působností Kraslice, SO ORP Kraslice) is an administrative district of municipality with extended powers in Karlovy Vary District in the Karlovy Vary Region of the Czech Republic. It has existed since 1 January 2003, when the districts were replaced administratively. It includes 8 municipalities which have a combined population of almost 13,000.

== Municipalities ==
Cities and towns are in bold.

Municipality	Population	Area (km^{2)}	Density
Bublava	403	6.15	66
Jindřichovice	521	44.38	12
**Kraslice**	6,573	81.33	81
**Oloví**	1,641	19.05	86
**Přebuz**	76	29.77	2.6
**Rotava**	2,798	12.01	232
Stříbrná	443	33.52	13
Šindelová	302	38.31	7.9

== Demographics ==
Historical population

Year	Pop.	±%
1869	31,835	—
1880	34,730	+9.1%
1890	38,011	+9.4%
1900	42,606	+12.1%
1910	49,909	+17.1%

Year	Pop.	±%
1921	46,083	−7.7%
1930	48,906	+6.1%
1950	13,535	−72.3%
1961	14,503	+7.2%
1970	15,725	+8.4%

Year	Pop.	±%
1980	14,930	−5.1%
1991	14,078	−5.7%
2001	14,106	+0.2%
2011	13,155	−6.7%
2021	12,211	−7.2%

Source: Censuses
