= Těšovice =

Těšovice may refer to places in the Czech Republic:

- Těšovice (Prachatice District), a municipality and village in the South Bohemian Region
- Těšovice (Sokolov District), a municipality and village in the Karlovy Vary Region
- Těšovice, a village and part of Srbice (Domažlice District) in the Plzeň Region
