= Kacerov =

Kačerov or Kaceřov may refer to places in the Czech Republic:

- Kačerov, a Prague Metro station
- Kaceřov (Sokolov District), a municipality and village in the Karlovy Vary Region
- Kaceřov (Plzeň-North District), a municipality and village in the Plzeň Region
- Kačerov, a village and part of Loket (Benešov District) in the Central Bohemian Region
