= Medard (lake) =

Lake in the Czech Republic

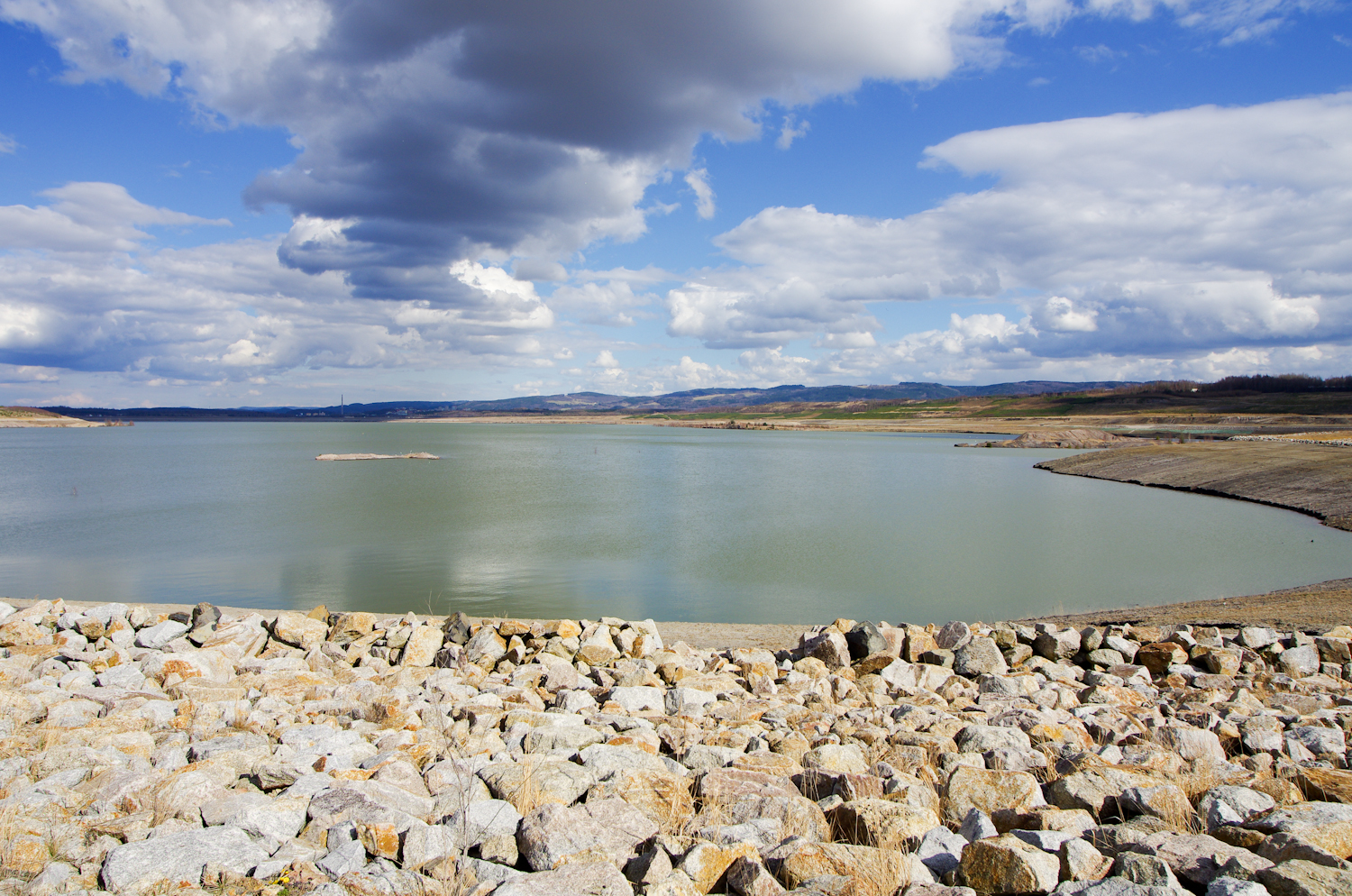

- Location within Czech Republic
- Location: Sokolov District, Karlovy Vary Region
- Coordinates: 50°10′46″N 12°35′45″E
- Lake type: Artificial
- Basin countries: Czech Republic
- Max. length: 4 km (2.5 mi)
- Max. width: 1.5 km (0.93 mi)
- Surface area: 4.9344 km^{2} (1.9052 sq mi)
- Max. depth: 60 m (200 ft)
- Water volume: 50,150,000 m^{3} (1.771×10^{9} cu ft)
- Settlements: Habartov, Svatava

Medard is an artificial lake (now 4.93 km^{2}) in the Karlovy Vary Region of the Czech Republic, northwest of Sokolov, in the territories of Svatava and Habartov. The lake was created by flooding the former coal mine called Medard-Libík. The lake's surface area stretches 493 ha, its maximum depth is 50 m and the capacity is approximately 50 mil. m^{3}. It is the largest lake in the Czech Republic.

== History ==
Five villages disappeared due to mining: Čistá u Svatavy, Dvory, Kolonie Hahnemannova, Kytlice, and Lísková

=== Termination of mining ===
In 2000, the mining of brown coal in Medard-Libík ceased and the quarry was closed.

=== Watering ===
Filling the lake began in June 2008 when Sokolovská uhelná has ceased to draw mine water from retention and completed Medard gross technical reclamation of the future lake bottom. Since 2010, the lake is filled with water from the River Ohře. Filling building stands near the village Citice at the narrowest point between the river Eger and future lake.

=== Additional coal mining ===
Since 2012, Sokolovská uhelná additionally mined coal near Svatava purportedly for reasons of firming shore. Reclamation and filling the lake was not interrupted.

== Utilisation ==
Within urban studies, the lake shore area is being considered for use for various sports and recreational activities such as indoor pool, bmx area, track for roller skating, soccer field, golf course, hotel complex, kiteboarding, base sport of yachting, equestrian base, camping, caravans, cabins, swimming pools, sports grounds rope, airfield for ultralight aircraft, motocross area, diving centre, beach activities, a softball field, boating camp, campus, amusement park. Some of these planned recreational activities (e.g., diving, fishing), however, maybe hindered by high heavy metal(loid) loads dissolved and cycled within the monimolimnion of this meromicitic lake. This latent pollution/resource requires implementing appropriate science-informed management strategies.
