= Vintířov =

Municipality in the Karlovy Vary Region, Czech Republic

- Municipality
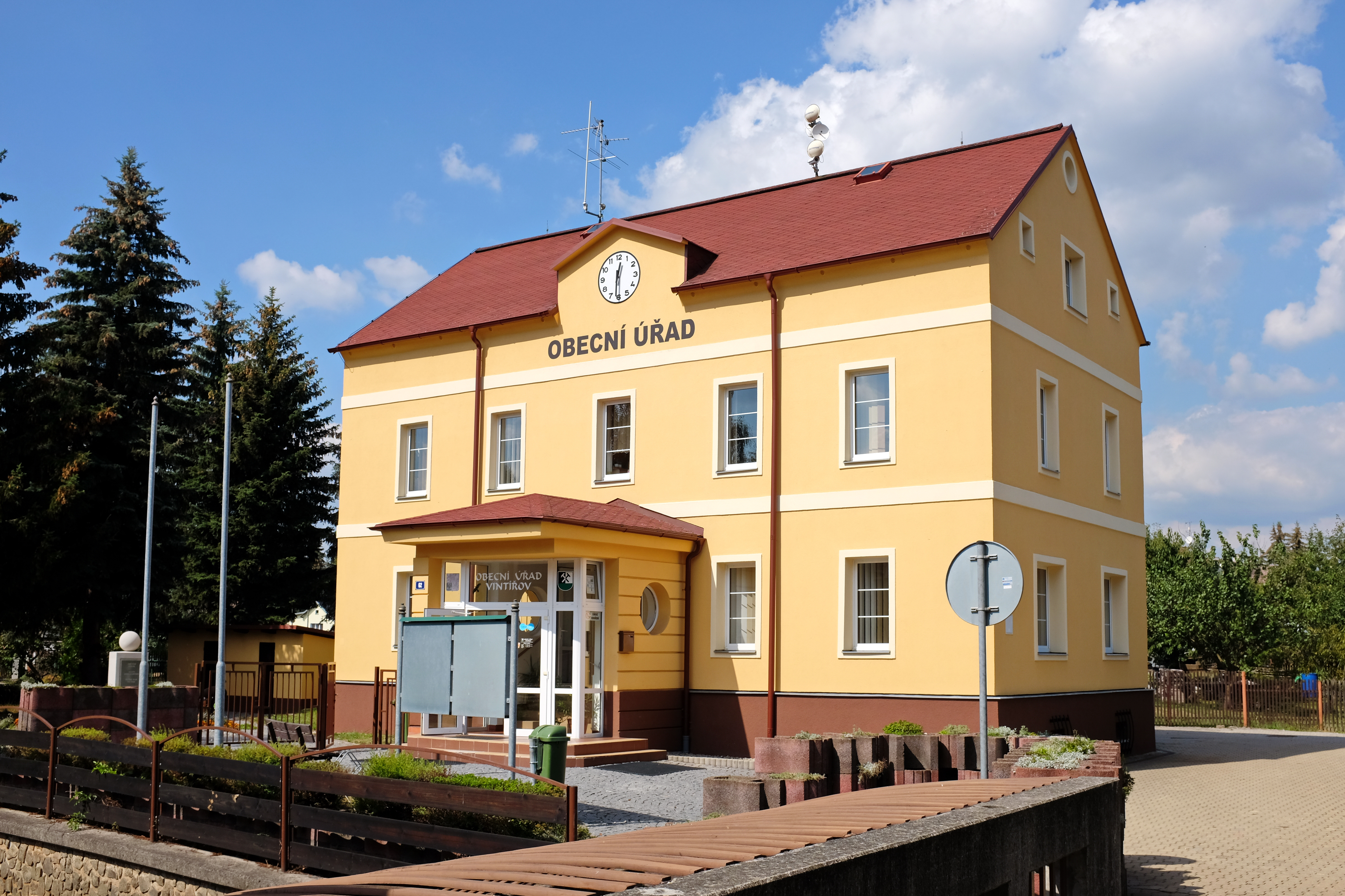
- Municipal office

- Flag Coat of arms

- Location in the Czech Republic
- Coordinates: 50°14′4″N 12°42′59″E
- Country: Czech Republic
- Region: Karlovy Vary
- District: Sokolov
- First mentioned: 1488

Area
  - Total: 14.36 km^{2} (5.54 sq mi)
- Elevation: 448 m (1,470 ft)

Population (2026-01-01)
  - Total: 1,245
  - Density: 86.70/km^{2} (224.5/sq mi)
- Time zone: UTC+1 (CET)
  - Summer (DST): UTC+2 (CEST)
- Postal code: 357 44
- Website: www.vintirov.cz

Vintířov (German: Wintersgrün) is a municipality and village in Sokolov District in the Karlovy Vary Region of the Czech Republic. It has about 1,200 inhabitants.

== Geography ==
Vintířov is located about 8 kilometres (5 mi) northeast of Sokolov and 9 km (6 mi) west of Karlovy Vary. It lies mostly in the Sokolov Basin, only the northwestern part of the municipal territory extends into the Ore Mountains. The highest point is at 561 m (1,841 ft) above sea level. The stream Vintířovský potok flows through the municipality. There are several small fishponds in the territory.

== History ==
The first written mention of Vintířov is from 1488. In 1523–1525, it was documented as a property of Sebastian Thüssel of Taltitz. From 1562, it was managed by the town of Loket and from 1598 Loket owned the village. As a result of the Bohemian Revolt, the properties of Loket were confiscated by Emperor Ferdinand II in 1623 and Vintířov was bought by Maria Magdalena Hertel of Leuttersdorf as part of the Lipnice estate.

For centuries, Vintířov was an agricultural village. In the 19th century, mining of lignite and ceramic clay developed here. Work in the mines and the porcelain factory led to an increase in the population. In 1971, the municipalities of Lipnice and Dolní Rozmyšl were annexed to Vintířov and these two villages were demolished due to the expansion of lignite mining.

After World War II, the German-speaking population was expelled.

== Demographics ==
Historical population

Year	Pop.	±%
1869	1,265	—
1880	1,066	−15.7%
1890	1,172	+9.9%
1900	1,705	+45.5%
1910	1,995	+17.0%

Year	Pop.	±%
1921	1,960	−1.8%
1930	2,076	+5.9%
1950	1,235	−40.5%
1961	1,239	+0.3%
1970	1,353	+9.2%

Year	Pop.	±%
1980	1,128	−16.6%
1991	945	−16.2%
2001	1,067	+12.9%
2011	1,081	+1.3%
2021	1,175	+8.7%

Source: Censuses

== Economy ==
The area of Vintířov is known for lignite mining.

== Transport ==
Apart from the industrial spur from the mines, there are no railways or major roads passing through the municipality.

== Sights ==
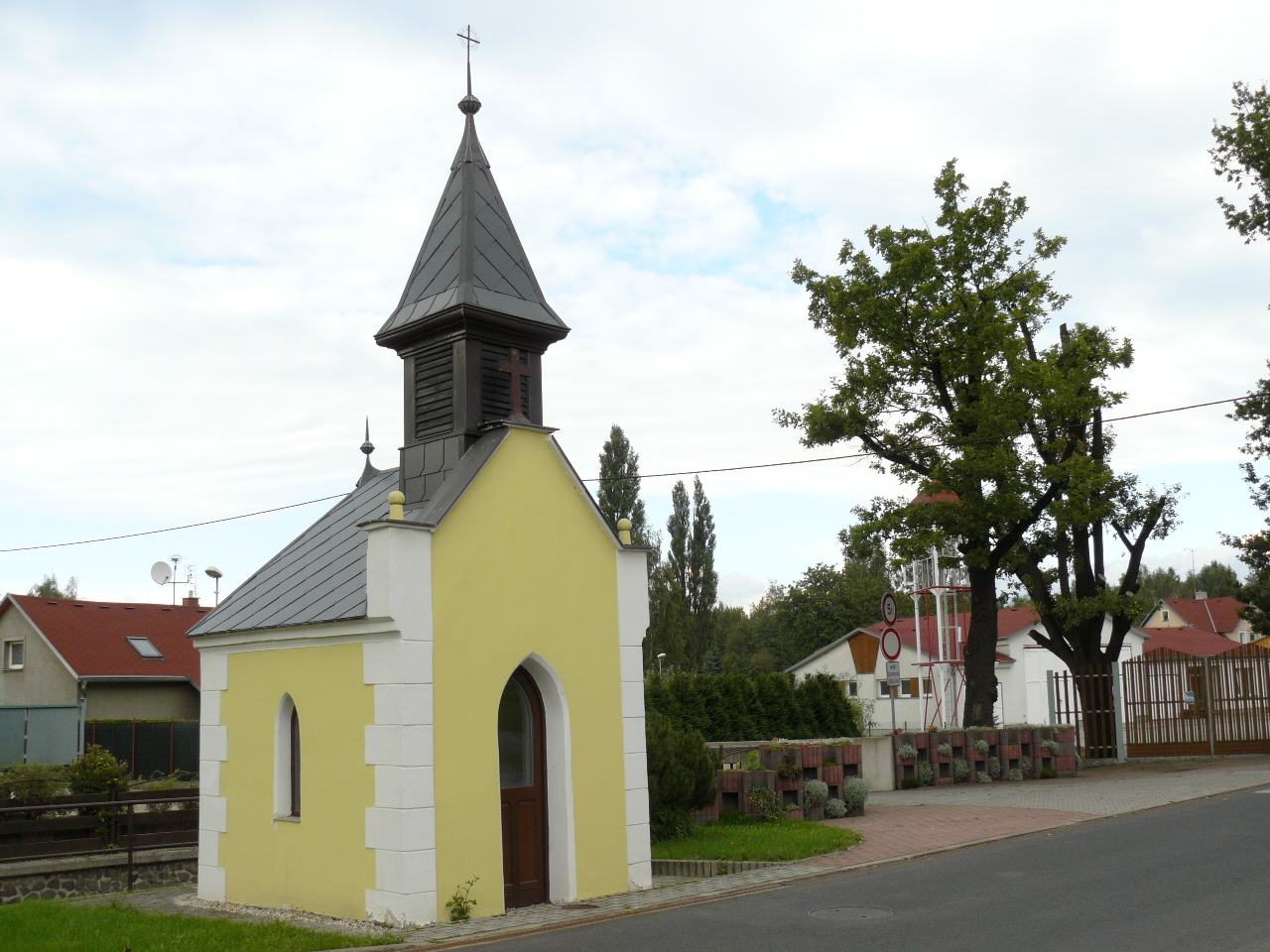
Chapel of Saint Anne

The only protected cultural monuments in the municipality are two rural half-timbered houses from the first half of the 19th century.

In the centre of Vintířov is the Chapel of Saint Anne. It was built in the pseudo-Gothic style in 1906.
