= Nová Ves (Sokolov District) =

- Municipality
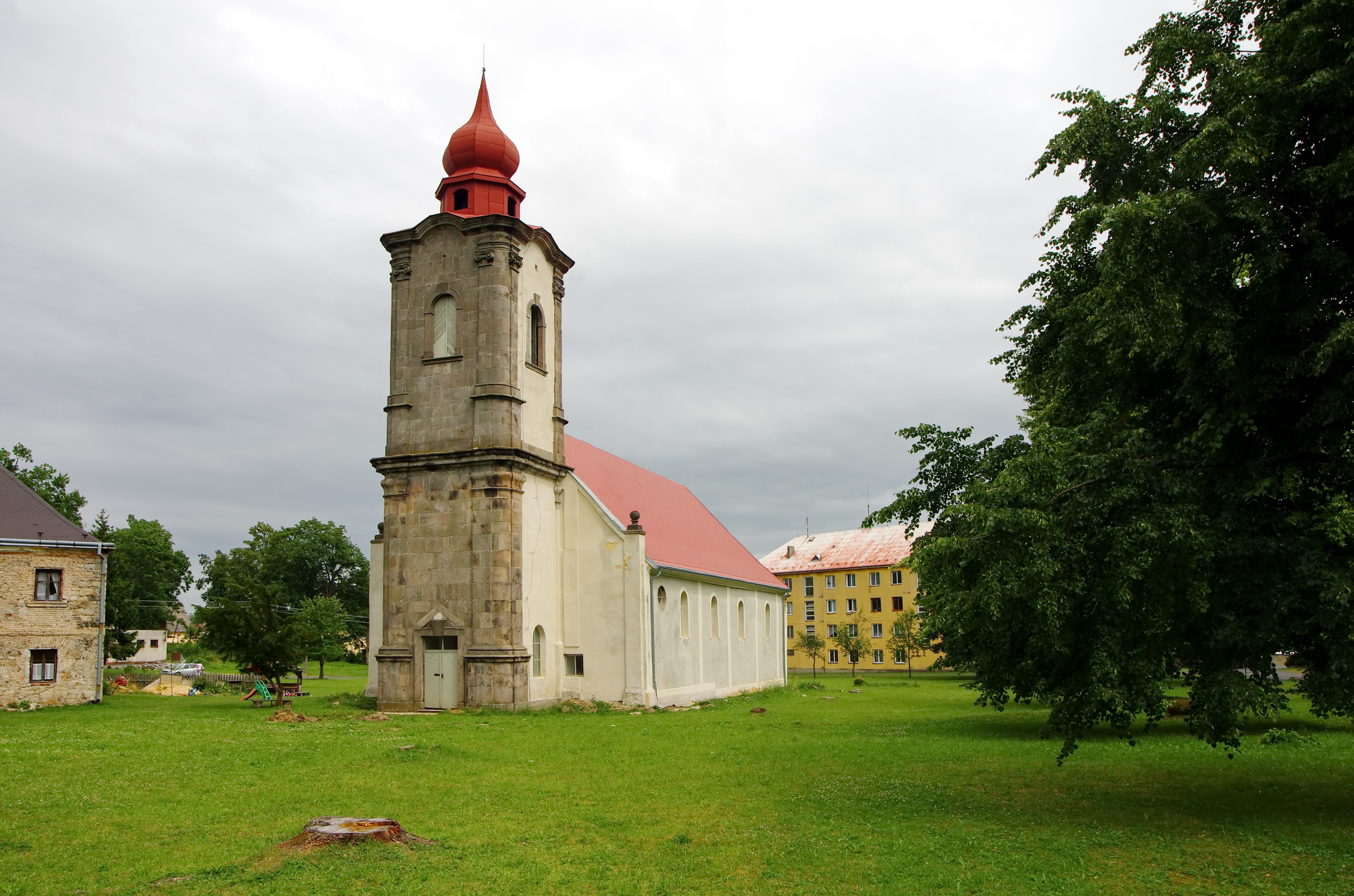
- Church of the Holy Trinity

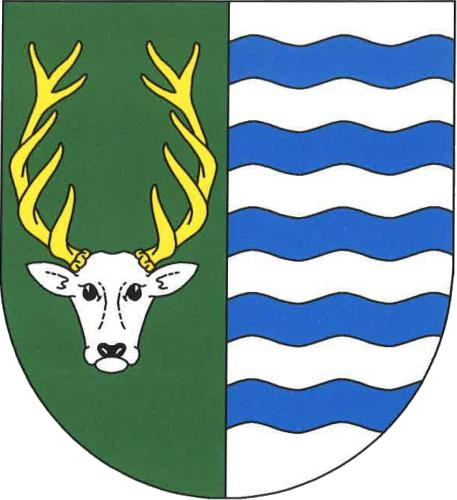
- Coat of arms

- Location in the Czech Republic
- Coordinates: 50°5′3″N 12°46′31″E
- Country: Czech Republic
- Region: Karlovy Vary
- District: Sokolov
- First mentioned: 1364

Area
  - Total: 26.96 km^{2} (10.41 sq mi)
- Elevation: 742 m (2,434 ft)

Population (2026-01-01)
  - Total: 229
  - Density: 8.49/km^{2} (22.0/sq mi)
- Time zone: UTC+1 (CET)
  - Summer (DST): UTC+2 (CEST)
- Postal codes: 353 01, 364 64
- Website: www.novaves-so.cz

Nová Ves (German: Neudorf) is a municipality and village in Sokolov District in the Karlovy Vary Region of the Czech Republic. It has about 200 inhabitants.

== Administrative division ==
Nová Ves consists of two municipal parts (in brackets population according to the 2021 census):

- Nová Ves (135)
- Louka (48)

== Demographics ==
Historical population
| Year | Pop. | ±% |
|---|---|---|
| 1869 | 2,597 | — |
| 1880 | 2,601 | +0.2% |
| 1890 | 2,371 | −8.8% |
| 1900 | 2,218 | −6.5% |
| 1910 | 2,167 | −2.3% |
| 1921 | 1,873 | −13.6% |
| 1930 | 1,846 | −1.4% |
| 1950 | 166 | −91.0% |
| 1961 | 202 | +21.7% |
| 1970 | 301 | +49.0% |
| 1980 | 278 | −7.6% |
| 1991 | 247 | −11.2% |
| 2001 | 256 | +3.6% |
| 2011 | 222 | −13.3% |
| 2021 | 183 | −17.6% |
Source: Censuses
