= Královské Poříčí =

- Municipality
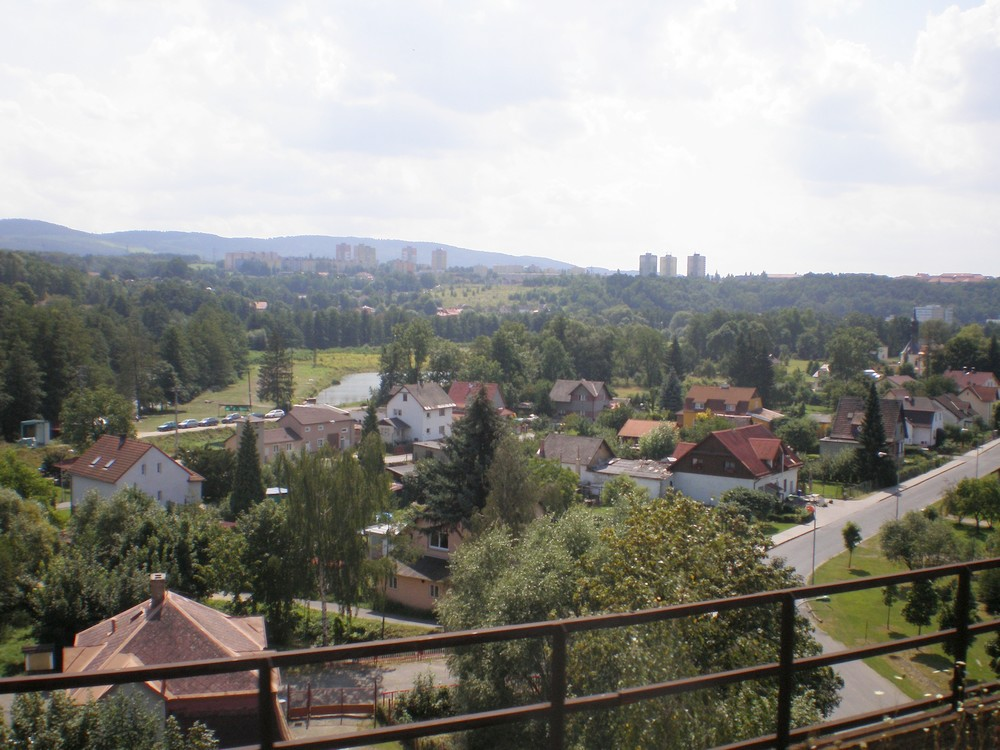
- Královské Poříčí with Sokolov in the background

- Flag Coat of arms

- Location in the Czech Republic
- Coordinates: 50°3′38″N 12°59′6″E
- Country: Czech Republic
- Region: Karlovy Vary
- District: Sokolov
- First mentioned: 1240

Area
  - Total: 12.20 km^{2} (4.71 sq mi)
- Elevation: 396 m (1,299 ft)

Population (2026-01-01)
  - Total: 768
  - Density: 63.0/km^{2} (163/sq mi)
- Time zone: UTC+1 (CET)
  - Summer (DST): UTC+2 (CEST)
- Postal code: 357 41
- Website: www.kralovske-porici.eu

Královské Poříčí (German: Königswerth) is a municipality and village in Sokolov District in the Karlovy Vary Region of the Czech Republic. It has about 800 inhabitants. It lies on the Ohře River. The folk architecture in the village centre is well preserved and is protected as a village monument zone.

== Administrative division ==
Královské Poříčí consists of two municipal parts (in brackets population according to the 2021 census):

- Královské Poříčí (893)
- Jehličná (0)

== History ==
The first written mention of Královské Poříčí is from 1240.

== Demographics ==
Historical population
Year	Pop.	±%
1869	839	—
1880	897	+6.9%
1890	1,486	+65.7%
1900	2,184	+47.0%
1910	2,362	+8.2%
1921	2,543	+7.7%
1930	2,634	+3.6%
1950	2,174	−17.5%
1961	2,163	−0.5%
1970	1,529	−29.3%
1980	981	−35.8%
1991	633	−35.5%
2001	710	+12.2%
2011	887	+24.9%
2021	893	+0.7%
Source: Censuses
