= Lomnice (Sokolov District) =

- Municipality
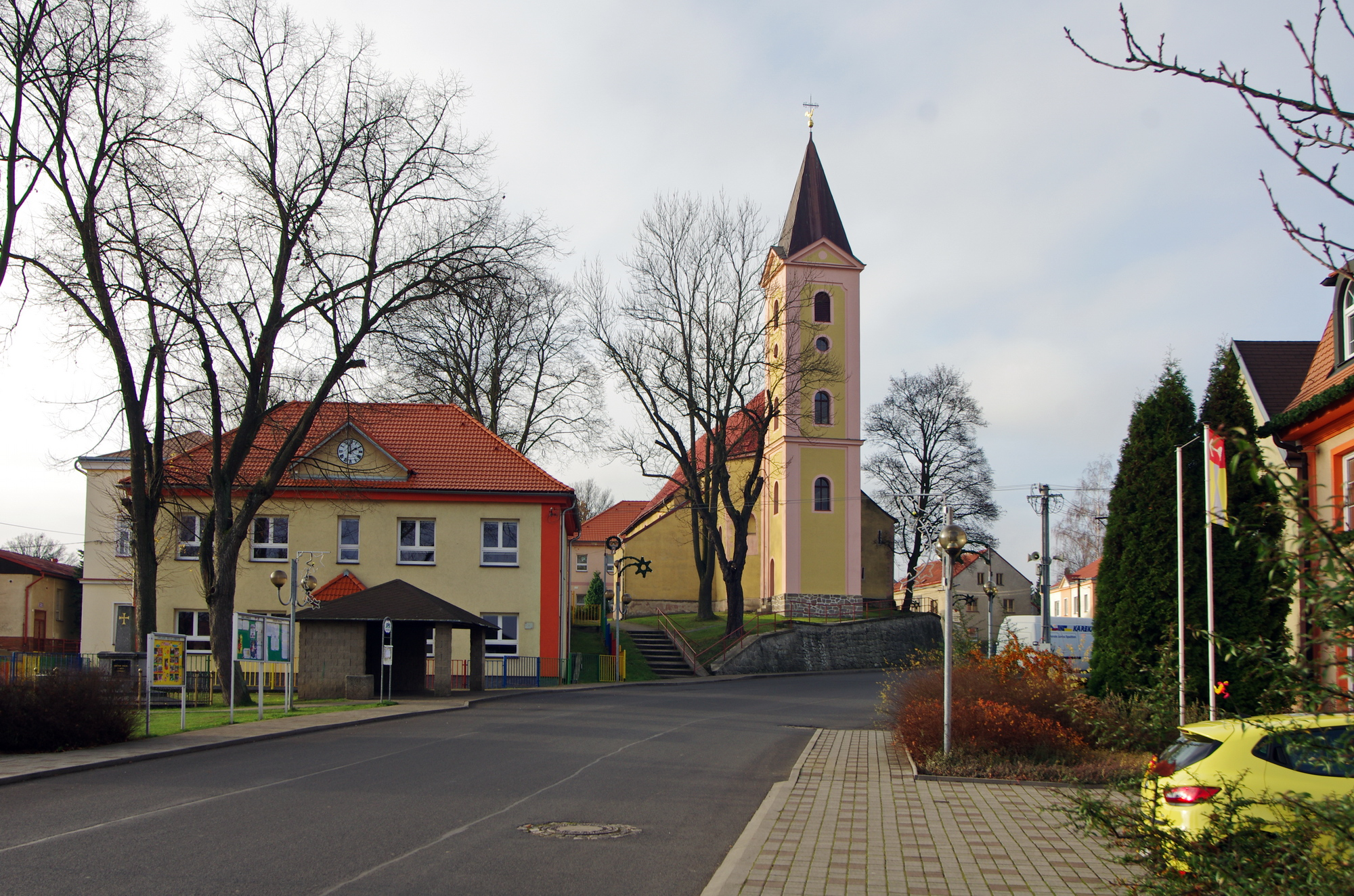
- Church of Saint Giles

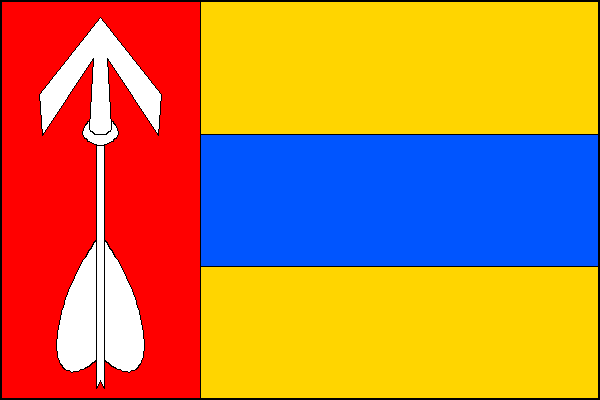
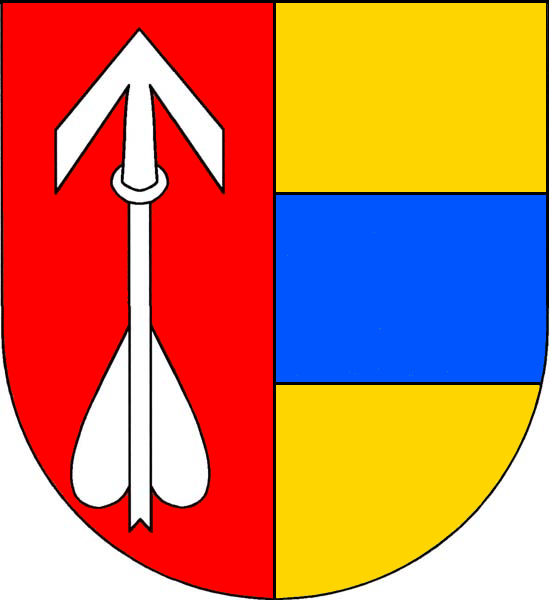
- Flag Coat of arms

- Location in the Czech Republic
- Coordinates: 50°12′43″N 12°37′58″E
- Country: Czech Republic
- Region: Karlovy Vary
- District: Sokolov
- First mentioned: 1339

Area
  - Total: 13.85 km^{2} (5.35 sq mi)
- Elevation: 443 m (1,453 ft)

Population (2026-01-01)
  - Total: 1,344
  - Density: 97.04/km^{2} (251.3/sq mi)
- Time zone: UTC+1 (CET)
  - Summer (DST): UTC+2 (CEST)
- Postal code: 356 01
- Website: www.obeclomnice.cz

Lomnice (German: Lanz) is a municipality and village in Sokolov District in the Karlovy Vary Region of the Czech Republic. It has about 1,300 inhabitants.

== Administrative division ==
Lomnice consists of two municipal parts (in brackets population according to the 2021 census):

- Lomnice (773)
- Týn (512)

== Demographics ==
Historical population
Year	Pop.	±%
1869	1,007	—
1880	1,160	+15.2%
1890	1,351	+16.5%
1900	1,700	+25.8%
1910	2,079	+22.3%
1921	2,334	+12.3%
1930	2,668	+14.3%
1950	1,776	−33.4%
1961	1,838	+3.5%
1970	1,392	−24.3%
1980	1,110	−20.3%
1991	947	−14.7%
2001	1,093	+15.4%
2011	1,152	+5.4%
2021	1,285	+11.5%
Source: Censuses
