= Libavské Údolí =

- Municipality
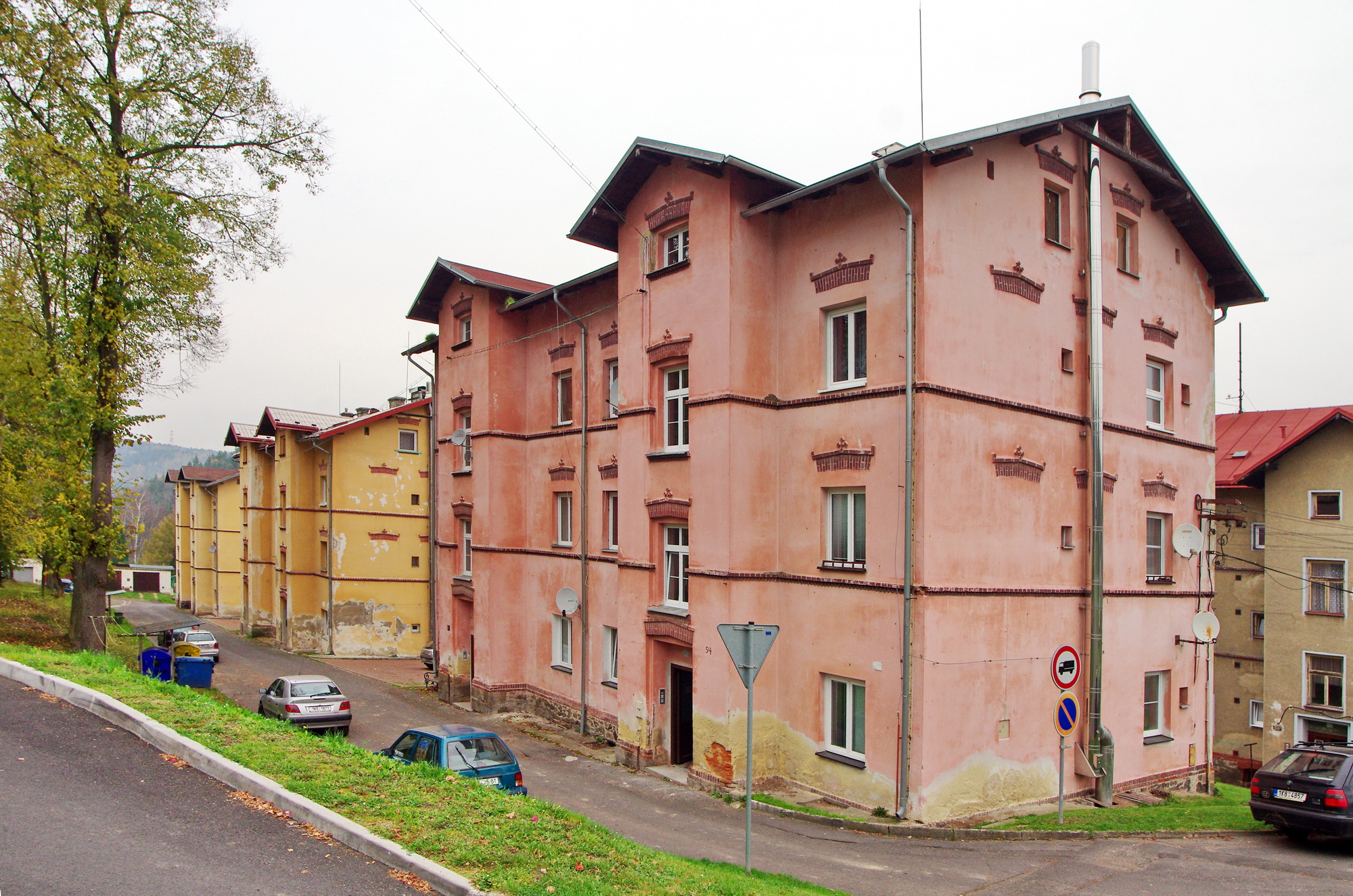
- Houses in Libavské Údolí

- Flag Coat of arms

- Location in the Czech Republic
- Coordinates: 50°7′44″N 12°33′9″E
- Country: Czech Republic
- Region: Karlovy Vary
- District: Sokolov
- First mentioned: 1829

Area
  - Total: 2.29 km^{2} (0.88 sq mi)
- Elevation: 442 m (1,450 ft)

Population (2026-01-01)
  - Total: 513
  - Density: 224/km^{2} (580/sq mi)
- Time zone: UTC+1 (CET)
  - Summer (DST): UTC+2 (CEST)
- Postal code: 357 53
- Website: www.libavskeudoli.cz

Libavské Údolí (German: Liebauthal) is a municipality and village in Sokolov District in the Karlovy Vary Region of the Czech Republic. It has about 500 inhabitants.

== Demographics ==
Historical population
Year	Pop.	±%
1869	296	—
1880	390	+31.8%
1890	286	−26.7%
1900	694	+142.7%
1910	1,128	+62.5%
1921	1,115	−1.2%
1930	1,250	+12.1%
1950	776	−37.9%
1961	731	−5.8%
1970	594	−18.7%
1980	587	−1.2%
1991	627	+6.8%
2001	589	−6.1%
2011	590	+0.2%
2021	489	−17.1%
Source: Censuses
