= Sokolov District =

Sokolov District Okres Sokolov
- District
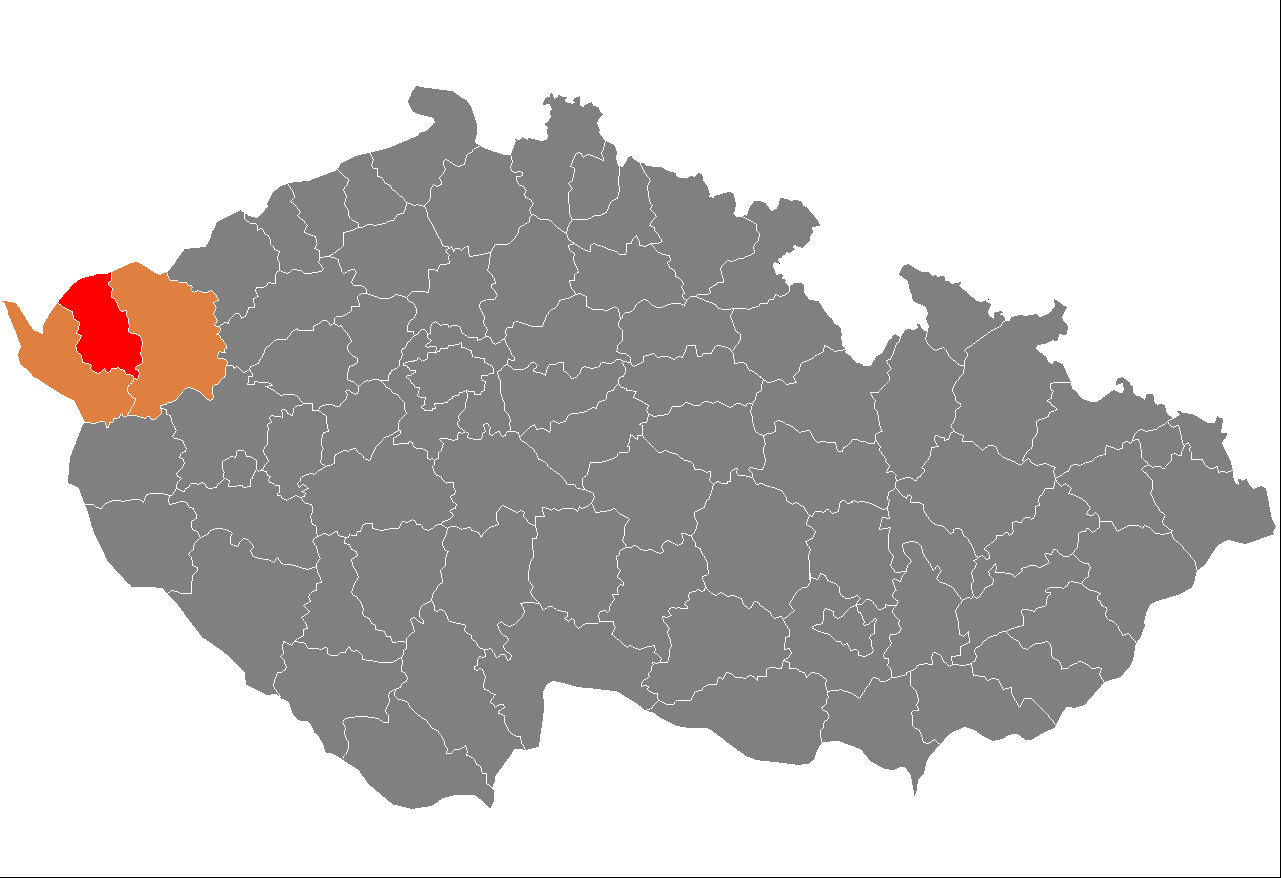
- Location in the Karlovy Vary Region within the Czech Republic
- Coordinates: 50°13′N 12°38′E
- Country: Czech Republic
- Region: Karlovy Vary
- Capital: Sokolov

Area
  - Total: 753.71 km^{2} (291.01 sq mi)

Population (2026)
  - Total: 84,315
  - Density: 111.87/km^{2} (289.73/sq mi)
- Time zone: UTC+1 (CET)
  - Summer (DST): UTC+2 (CEST)
- Municipalities: 38
- * Towns: 13
- * Market towns: 1

Sokolov District (Czech: okres Sokolov) is a district in the Karlovy Vary Region of the Czech Republic. Its capital is the town of Sokolov.

== Administrative division ==
Sokolov District is divided into two administrative districts of municipalities with extended competence: Sokolov and Kraslice.

=== List of municipalities ===
Towns are marked in bold:

Březová - Bublava - Bukovany - Chlum Svaté Maří - Chodov - Citice - Dasnice - Dolní Nivy - Dolní Rychnov - Habartov - Horní Slavkov - Jindřichovice - Josefov - Kaceřov - Krajková - Královské Poříčí - Kraslice - Krásno - Kynšperk nad Ohří - Libavské Údolí - Loket - Lomnice - Nová Ves - Nové Sedlo - Oloví - Přebuz - Rotava - Rovná - Šabina - Šindelová - Sokolov - Staré Sedlo - Stříbrná - Svatava - Tatrovice - Těšovice - Vintířov - Vřesová

== Geography ==
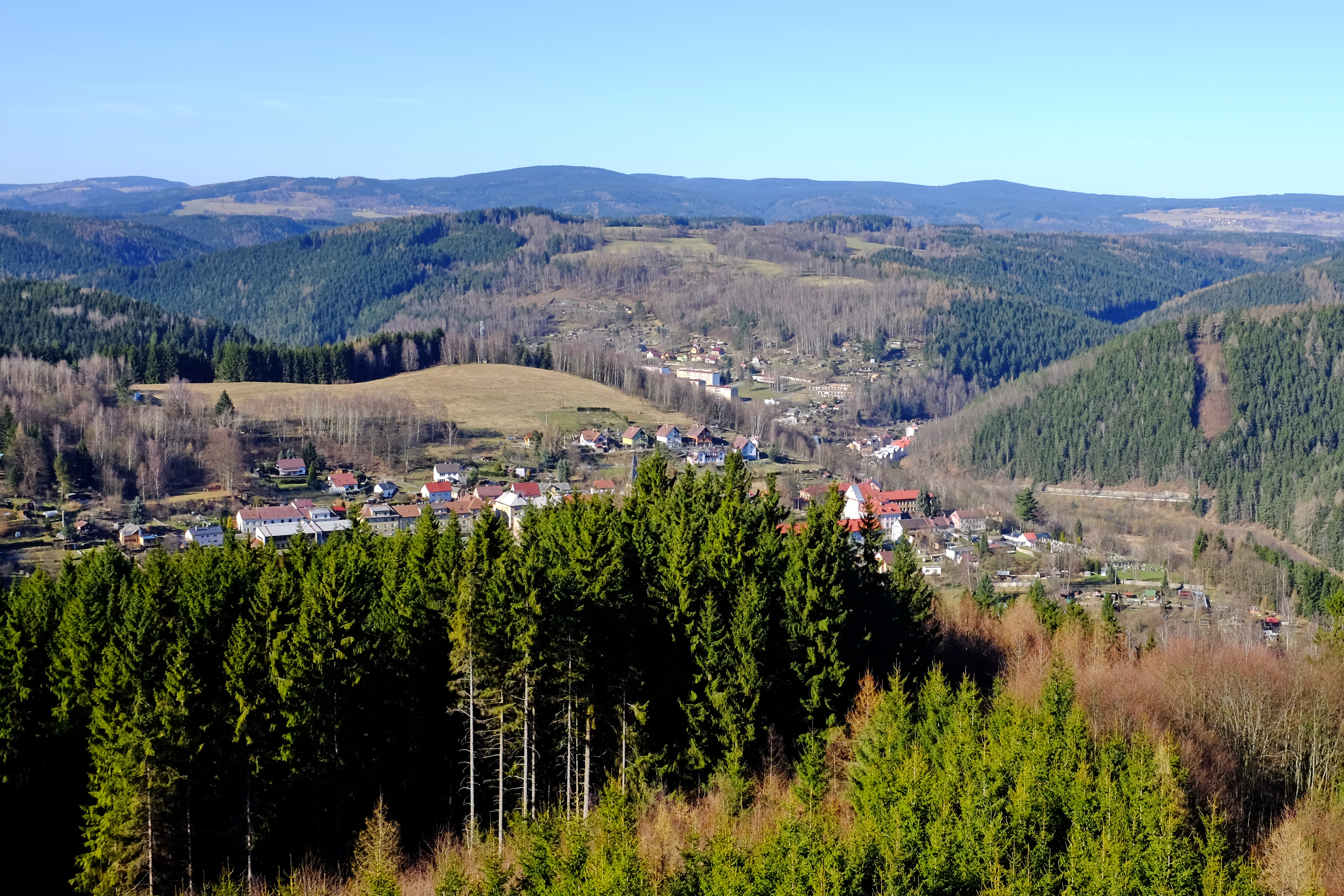
Oloví and surrounding landscape

Sokolov District borders Germany in the north. The terrain is characterised by two mountain ranges with a forested landscape, between which there is an unforested depression. The territory extends into five geomorphological mesoregions: Ore Mountains (north), Sokolov Basin (centre), Slavkov Forest (south), Cheb Basin (small part in the west) and Fichtel Mountains (very small part in the northwest). The highest point of the district is the mountain Špičák in Stříbrná with an elevation of 995 m (3,264 ft). The lowest point is the river bed of the Ohře in Loket at 374 m (1,227 ft).

From the total district area of 753.7 km^{2} (291.0 sq mi), agricultural land occupies 209.0 km^{2} (80.7 sq mi), forests occupy 390.1 km^{2} (150.6 sq mi), and water area occupies 17.4 km^{2} (6.7 sq mi). Forests cover 51.8% of the district's area.

The most important river is the Ohře, which flows across the district from west to east and drains the entire territory. Its longest tributary in the district is the Svatava. The Teplá River forms part of the southeastern district border. There are several water reservoirs and artificial lakes created by reclamation after coal mining. The largest body of water is Medard Lake.

In the district is one protected landscape area, located in the south of the district: Slavkovský les.

== Demographics ==
Historical population

Year	Pop.	±%
1869	89,483	—
1880	97,483	+8.9%
1890	108,134	+10.9%
1900	127,488	+17.9%
1910	141,448	+11.0%

Year	Pop.	±%
1921	136,452	−3.5%
1930	145,847	+6.9%
1950	66,695	−54.3%
1961	79,210	+18.8%
1970	90,289	+14.0%

Year	Pop.	±%
1980	95,444	+5.7%
1991	92,623	−3.0%
2001	93,607	+1.1%
2011	89,961	−3.9%
2021	83,987	−6.6%

Source: Censuses

=== Most populous municipalities ===
Name	Population	Area (km^{2})
Sokolov	21,908	23
Chodov	12,451	14
Kraslice	6,369	81
Horní Slavkov	5,071	37
Habartov	4,614	21
Kynšperk nad Ohří	4,537	23
Loket	2,990	27
Rotava	2,753	12
Březová	2,640	60
Nové Sedlo	2,527	17

== Economy ==
The largest employers with headquarters in Sokolov District and at least 250 employees are:

Economic entity	Location	Number of employees	Main activity
Sokolovská uhelná	Sokolov	500–999	Coal mining
Safeguard Service	Chodov	250–499	Private security activities
SKF Lubrication Systems CZ	Chodov	250–499	Manufacture of lubrication systems
ept connector	Habartov	250–499	Manufacture of wiring devices
SUAS Transportation Service	Sokolov	250–499	Rental of construction machinery and cars
Synthomer	Sokolov	250–499	Chemical industry
Town of Sokolov	Sokolov	250–499	Public administration
Wieland Electric	Sokolov	250–499	Manufacture of electrical wires and cables

== Transport ==
The D6 motorway from Karlovy Vary to Cheb (part of the European routes E48 and E49) passes through the district.

== Sights ==
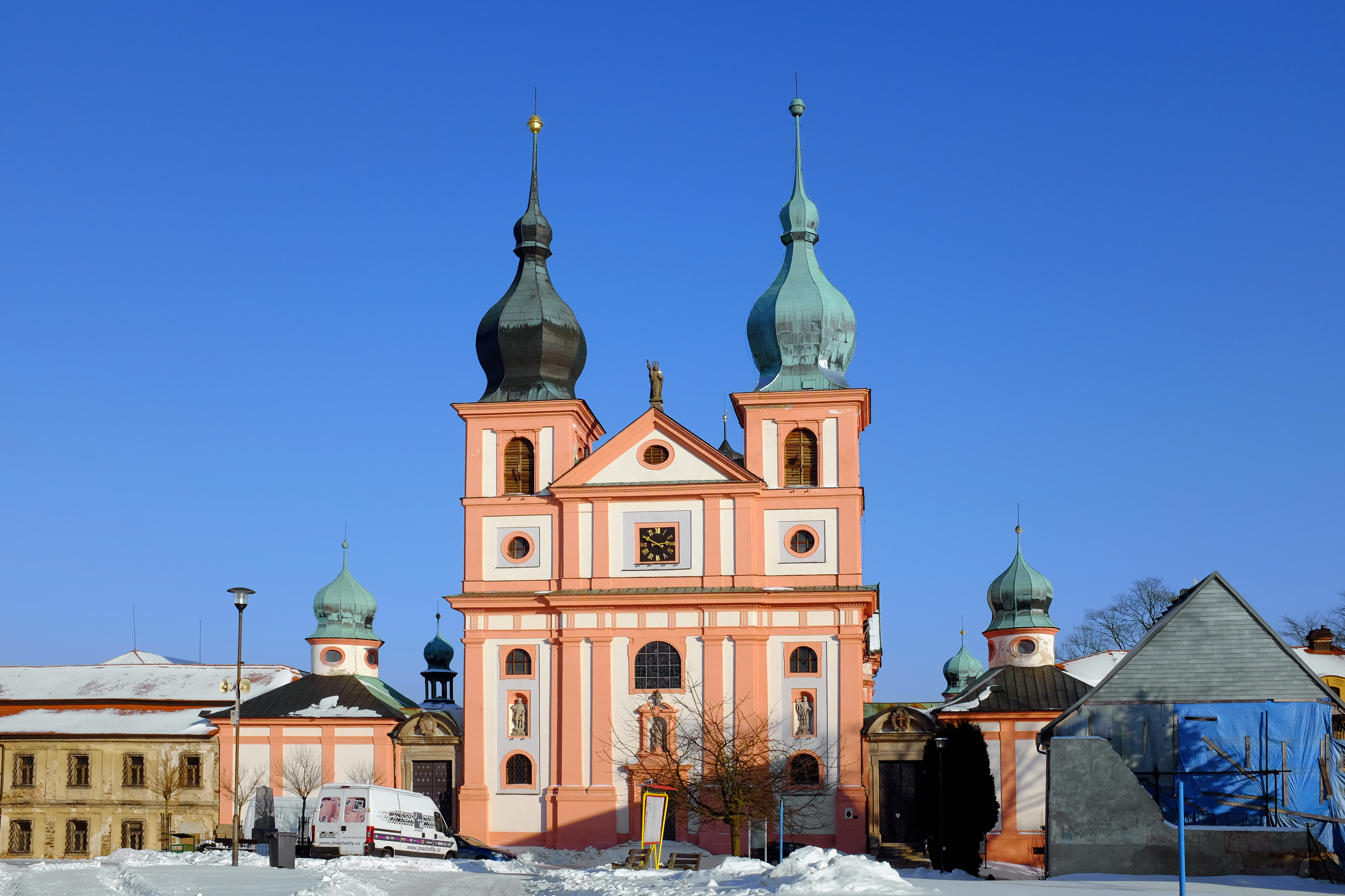
Church of the Assumption of the Virgin Mary and Saint Mary Magdalene

The most important monuments in the district, protected as national cultural monuments, are:

- Jeroným Mine in Podstrání
- Artificial water channel Dlouhá stoka (partly)
- Pilgrimage area Chlum Svaté Maří with the Church of the Assumption of the Virgin Mary and Saint Mary Magdalene

The best-preserved settlements, protected as monument reservations and monument zones, are:

- Loket (monument reservation)
- Horní Slavkov
- Dolní Rychnov
- Královské Poříčí

The most visited tourist destination is the Loket Castle.
