= Tatrovice =

- Municipality
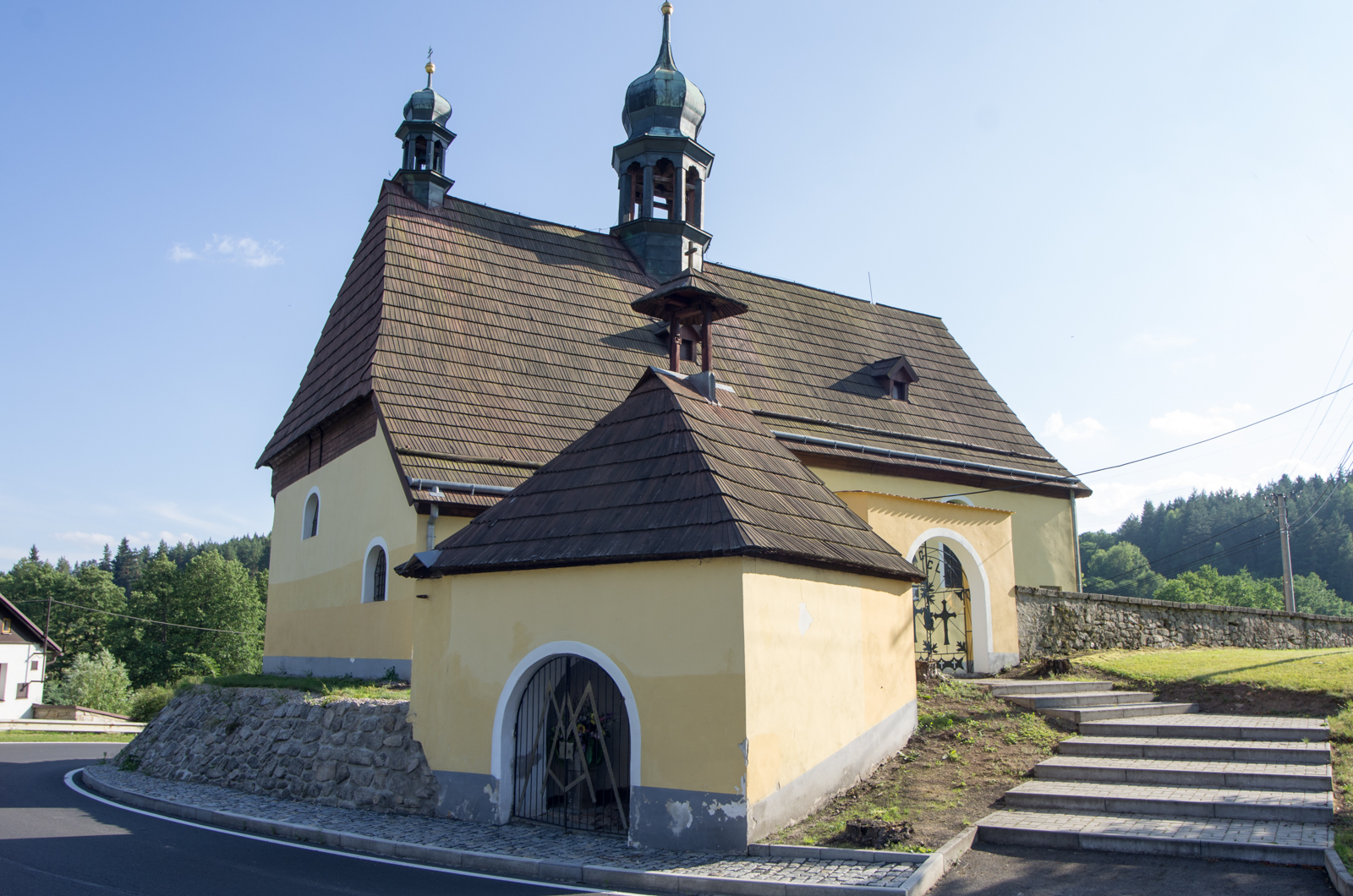
- Church of Saint Erhard

- Flag Coat of arms

- Location in the Czech Republic
- Coordinates: 50°16′37″N 12°41′50″E
- Country: Czech Republic
- Region: Karlovy Vary
- District: Sokolov
- First mentioned: 1356

Area
  - Total: 10.13 km^{2} (3.91 sq mi)
- Elevation: 564 m (1,850 ft)

Population (2026-01-01)
  - Total: 166
  - Density: 16.4/km^{2} (42.4/sq mi)
- Time zone: UTC+1 (CET)
  - Summer (DST): UTC+2 (CEST)
- Postal code: 357 35
- Website: www.tatrovice.cz

Tatrovice (German: Dotterwies) is a municipality and village in Sokolov District in the Karlovy Vary Region of the Czech Republic. It has about 200 inhabitants.

== Demographics ==
Historical population
Year	Pop.	±%
1869	588	—
1880	581	−1.2%
1890	681	+17.2%
1900	694	+1.9%
1910	718	+3.5%
1921	697	−2.9%
1930	745	+6.9%
1950	153	−79.5%
1961	173	+13.1%
1970	140	−19.1%
1980	131	−6.4%
1991	112	−14.5%
2001	134	+19.6%
2011	168	+25.4%
2021	160	−4.8%
Source: Censuses
