= Šabina =

- Municipality
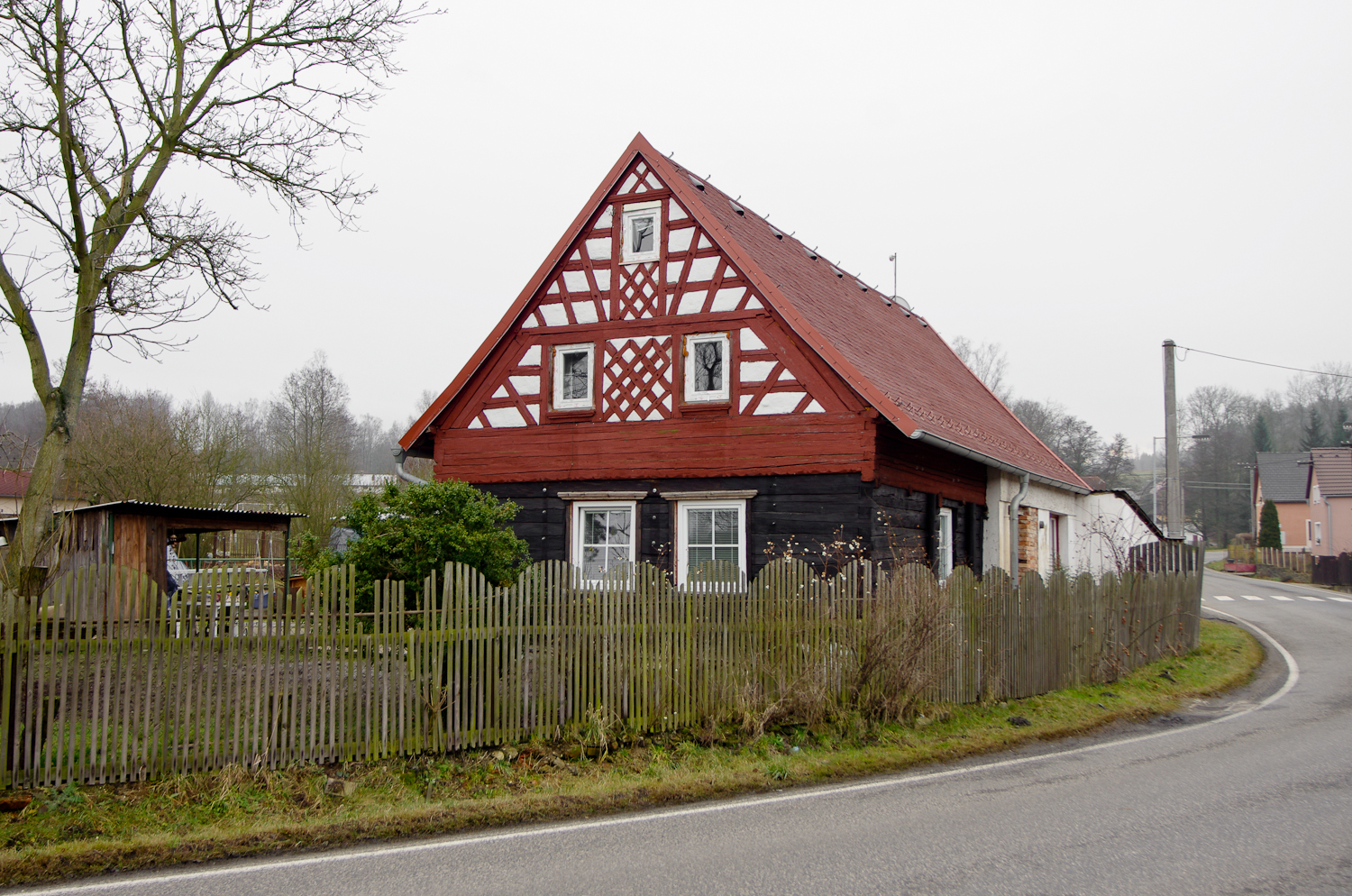
- Traditional timber-framed house

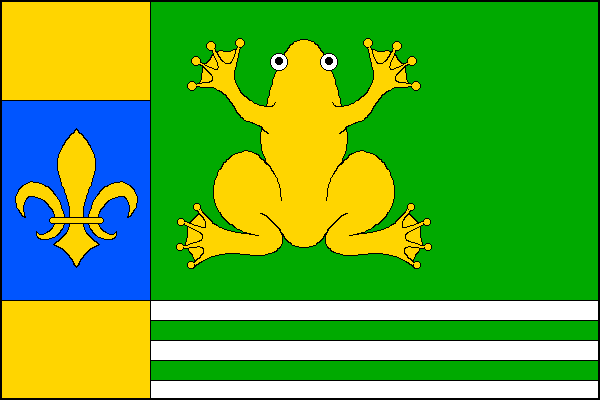
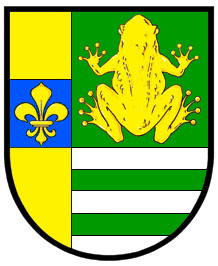
- Flag Coat of arms

- Location in the Czech Republic
- Coordinates: 50°8′9″N 12°34′57″E
- Country: Czech Republic
- Region: Karlovy Vary
- District: Sokolov
- First mentioned: 1309

Area
  - Total: 5.07 km^{2} (1.96 sq mi)
- Elevation: 408 m (1,339 ft)

Population (2026-01-01)
  - Total: 394
  - Density: 77.7/km^{2} (201/sq mi)
- Time zone: UTC+1 (CET)
  - Summer (DST): UTC+2 (CEST)
- Postal codes: 356 01, 357 51
- Website: www.obec-sabina.cz

Šabina (German: Schaben) is a municipality and village in Sokolov District in the Karlovy Vary Region of the Czech Republic. It has about 400 inhabitants.

== Demographics ==
Historical population
Year	Pop.	±%
1869	417	—
1880	429	+2.9%
1890	423	−1.4%
1900	519	+22.7%
1910	613	+18.1%
1921	589	−3.9%
1930	633	+7.5%
1950	325	−48.7%
1961	296	−8.9%
1970	256	−13.5%
1980	249	−2.7%
1991	251	+0.8%
2001	285	+13.5%
2011	316	+10.9%
2021	331	+4.7%
Source: Censuses
