= Dolní Nivy =

- Municipality
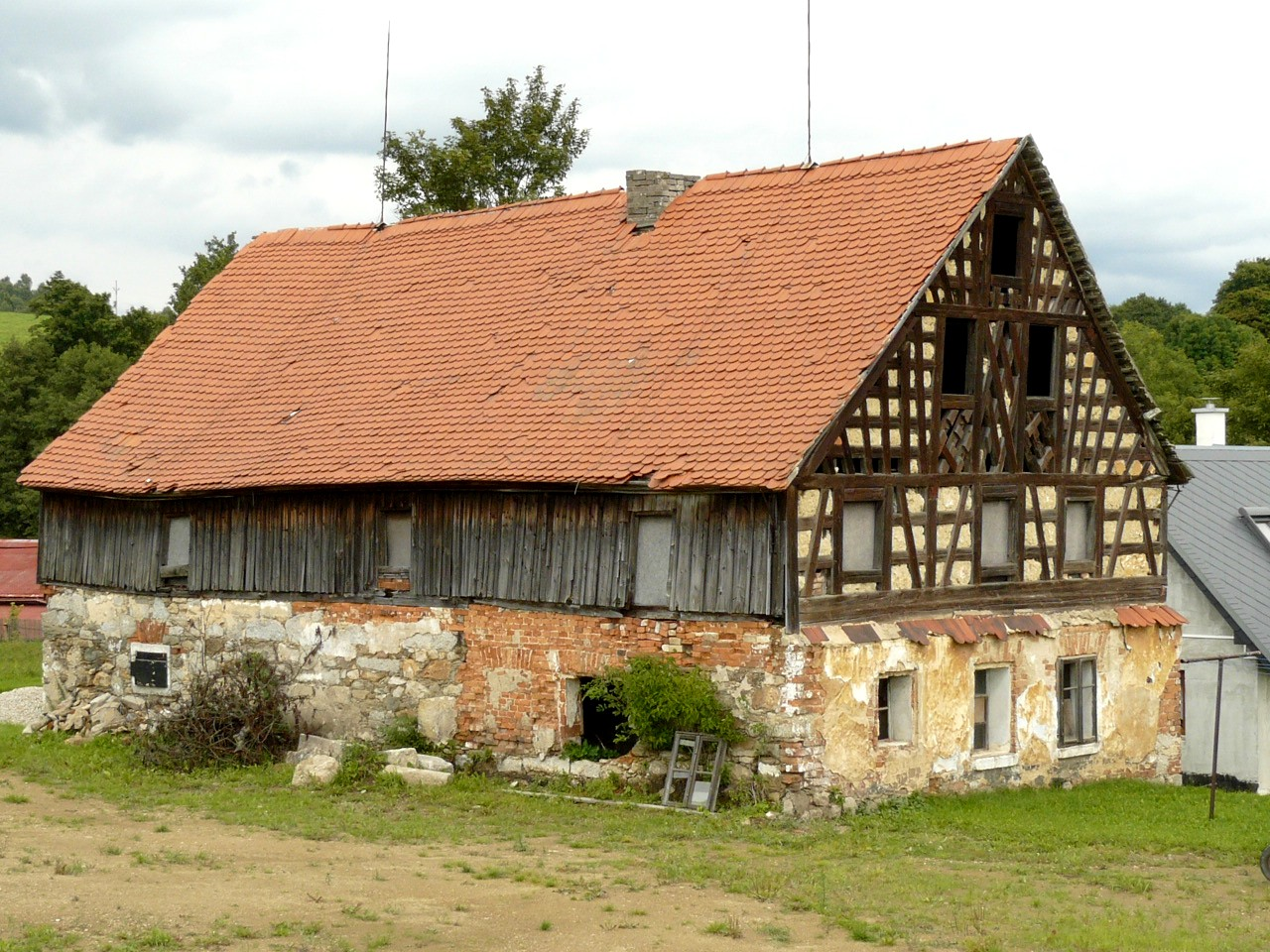
- Half-timbered farmhouse

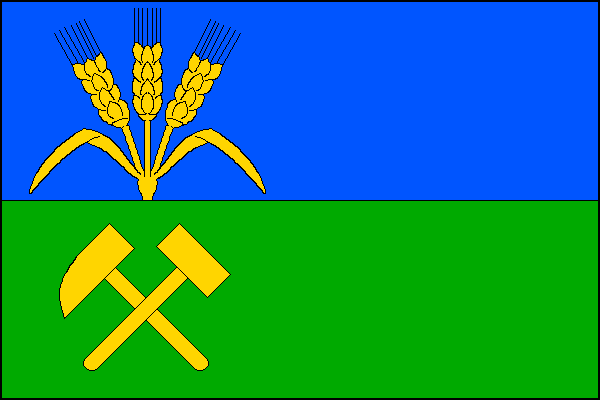
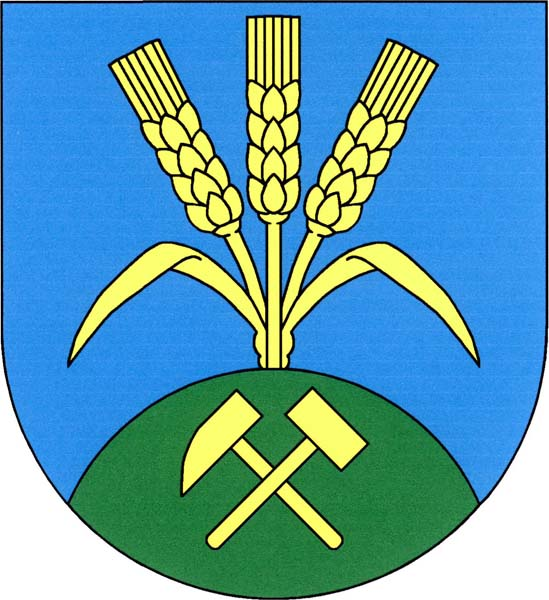
- Flag Coat of arms

- Location in the Czech Republic
- Coordinates: 50°14′36″N 12°38′14″E
- Country: Czech Republic
- Region: Karlovy Vary
- District: Sokolov
- First mentioned: 1353

Area
  - Total: 18.82 km^{2} (7.27 sq mi)
- Elevation: 552 m (1,811 ft)

Population (2026-01-01)
  - Total: 368
  - Density: 19.6/km^{2} (50.6/sq mi)
- Time zone: UTC+1 (CET)
  - Summer (DST): UTC+2 (CEST)
- Postal code: 356 01
- Website: www.dolninivy.cz

Dolní Nivy (German: Unter Neugrün) is a municipality and village in Sokolov District in the Karlovy Vary Region of the Czech Republic. It has about 400 inhabitants.

== Administrative division ==
Dolní Nivy consists of four municipal parts (in brackets population according to the 2021 census):

- Dolní Nivy (160)
- Boučí (57)
- Horní Nivy (76)
- Horní Rozmyšl (48)

== Demographics ==
Historical population
Year	Pop.	±%
1869	1,363	—
1880	1,362	−0.1%
1890	1,304	−4.3%
1900	1,414	+8.4%
1910	1,469	+3.9%
1921	1,461	−0.5%
1930	1,543	+5.6%
1950	688	−55.4%
1961	731	+6.2%
1970	508	−30.5%
1980	382	−24.8%
1991	243	−36.4%
2001	271	+11.5%
2011	313	+15.5%
2021	341	+8.9%
Source: Censuses
