= Vřesová =

- Municipality
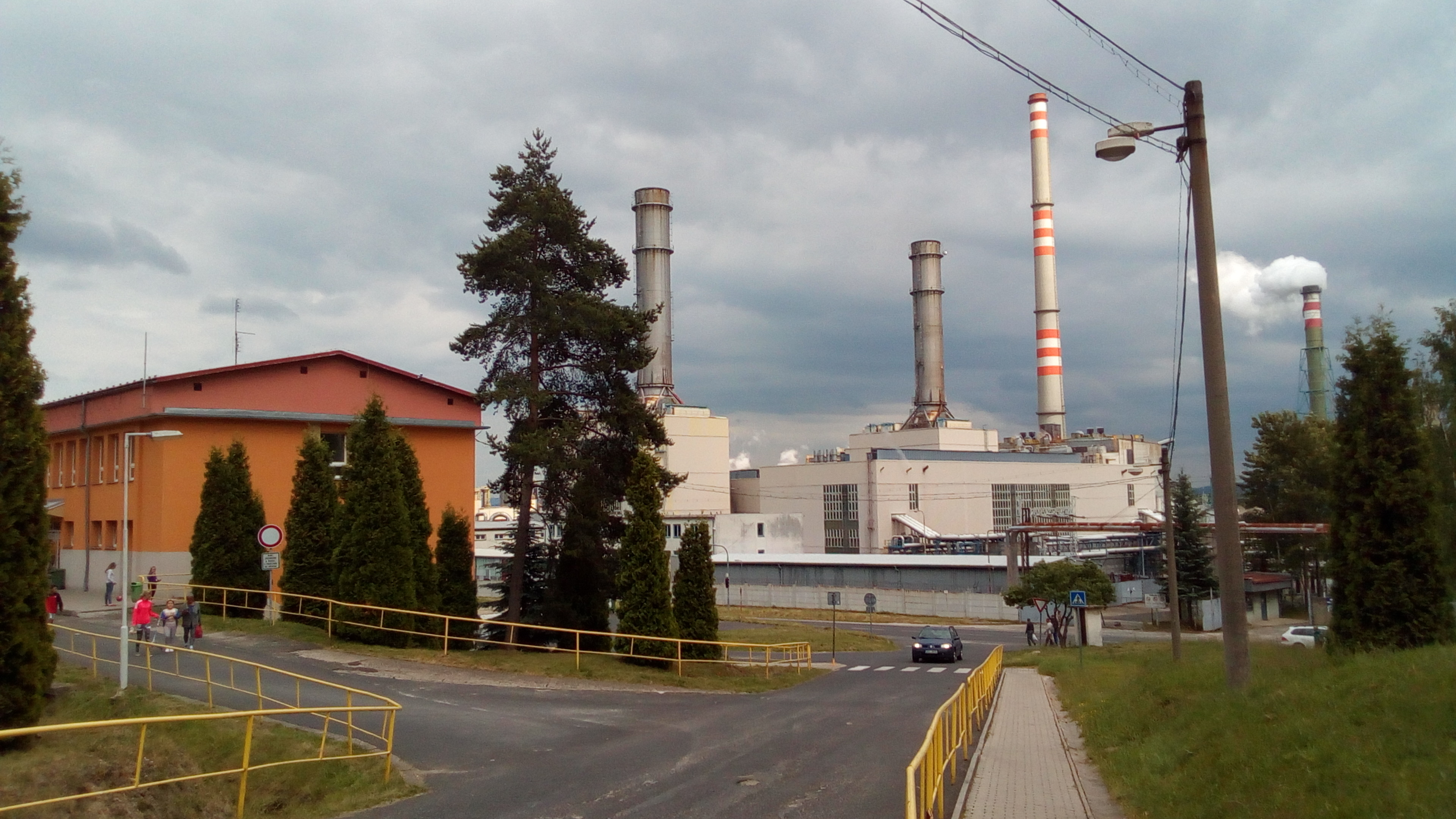
- Municipal office (left) and industrial complex

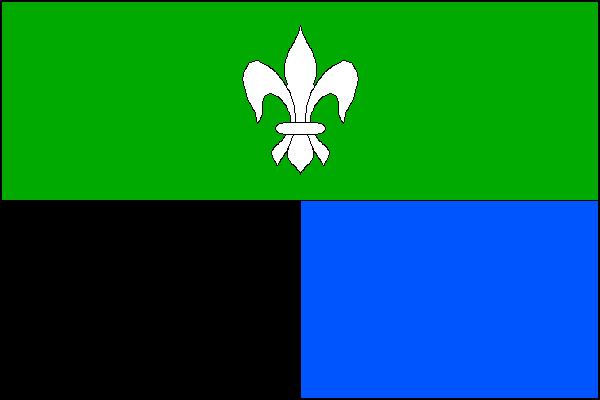
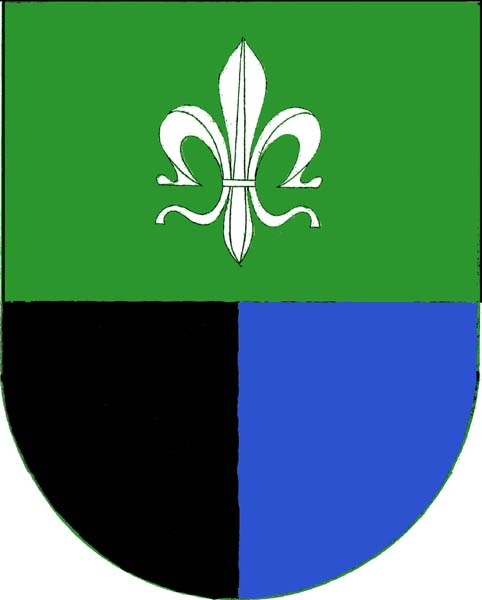
- Flag Coat of arms

- Location in the Czech Republic
- Coordinates: 50°15′33″N 12°41′48″E
- Country: Czech Republic
- Region: Karlovy Vary
- District: Sokolov
- First mentioned: 1492

Area
  - Total: 3.13 km^{2} (1.21 sq mi)
- Elevation: 473 m (1,552 ft)

Population (2026-01-01)
  - Total: 430
  - Density: 140/km^{2} (360/sq mi)
- Time zone: UTC+1 (CET)
  - Summer (DST): UTC+2 (CEST)
- Postal code: 357 35
- Website: www.ouvresova.cz

Vřesová (German: Doglasgrün) is a municipality and village in Sokolov District in the Karlovy Vary Region of the Czech Republic. It has about 400 inhabitants.

== Demographics ==
Historical population
Year	Pop.	±%
1869	599	—
1880	601	+0.3%
1890	629	+4.7%
1900	678	+7.8%
1910	766	+13.0%
1921	779	+1.7%
1930	900	+15.5%
1950	407	−54.8%
1961	162	−60.2%
1970	84	−48.1%
1980	216	+157.1%
1991	196	−9.3%
2001	341	+74.0%
2011	347	+1.8%
2021	360	+3.7%
Source: Censuses

== Economy ==
Vřesová is known for the large industrial complex of Sokolovská uhelná. The company is one of the main Czech companies operating in the energy sector, focuses on electricity generation, lignite mining and lignite processing.
