= Bukovany (Sokolov District) =

- Municipality
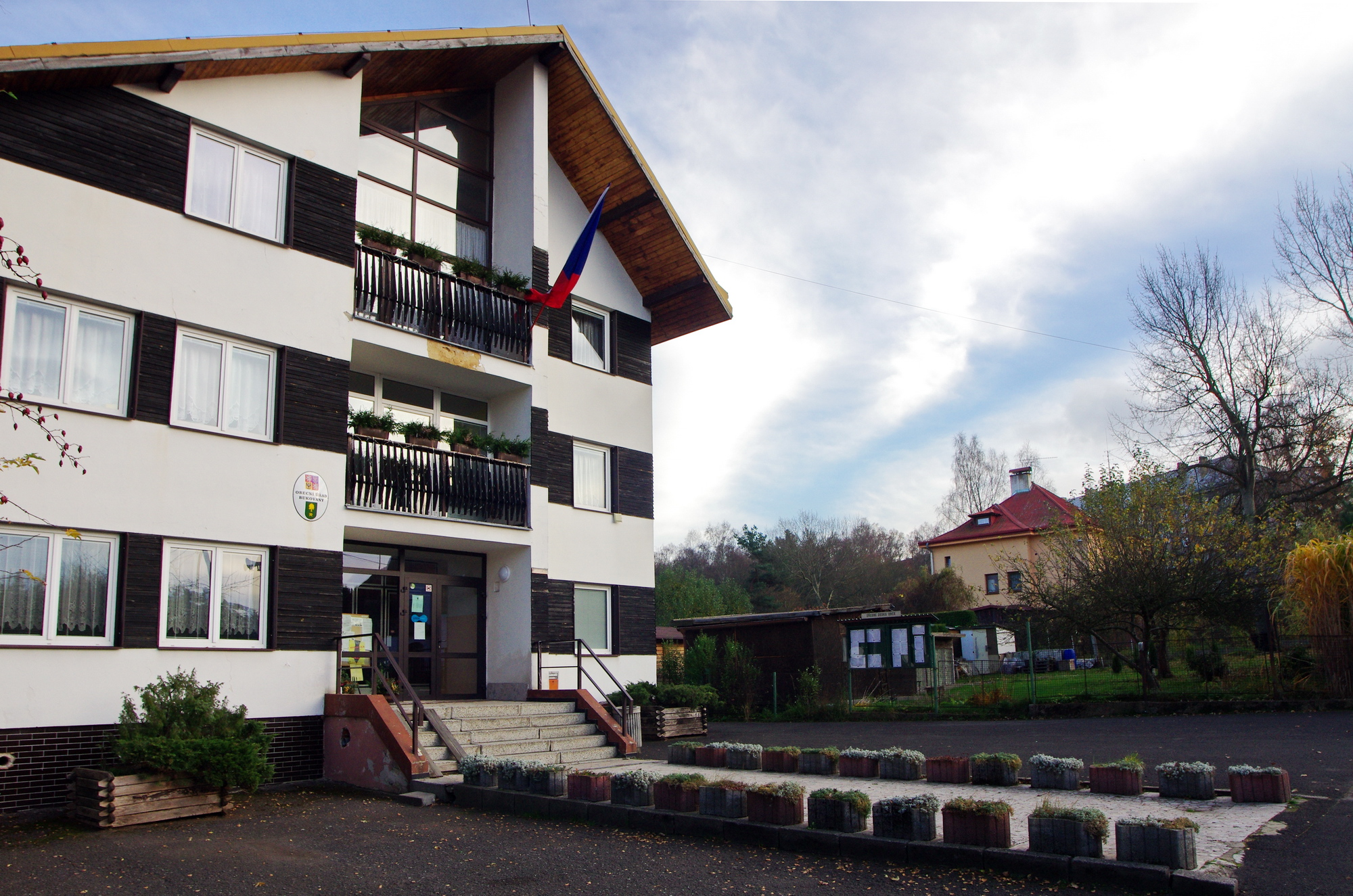
- Municipal office

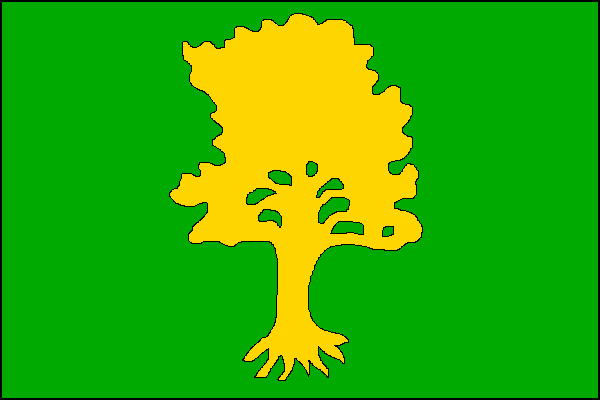
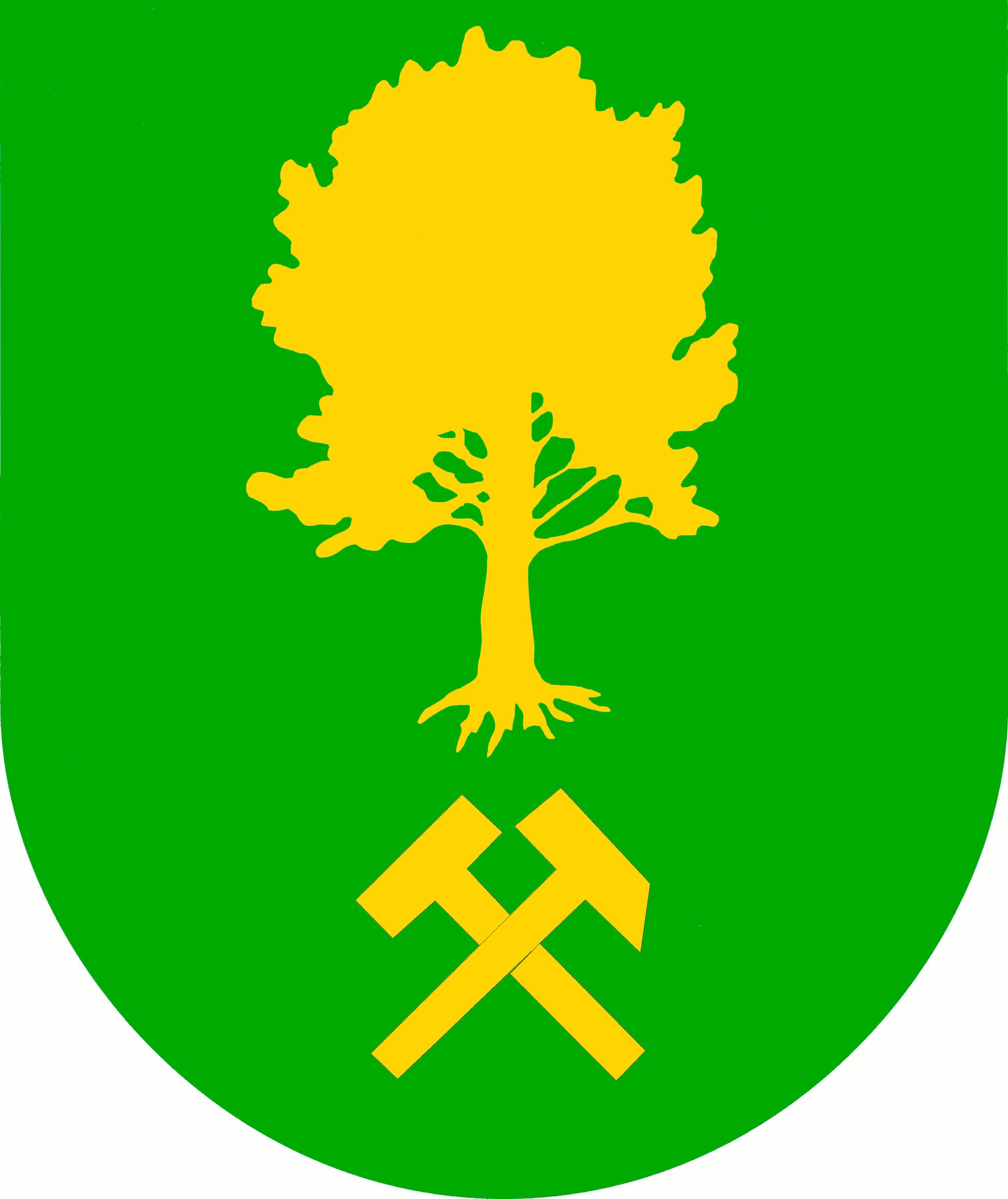
- Flag Coat of arms

- Location in the Czech Republic
- Coordinates: 50°9′59″N 12°34′22″E
- Country: Czech Republic
- Region: Karlovy Vary
- District: Sokolov
- First mentioned: 1304

Area
  - Total: 3.10 km^{2} (1.20 sq mi)
- Elevation: 440 m (1,440 ft)

Population (2026-01-01)
  - Total: 1,476
  - Density: 476/km^{2} (1,230/sq mi)
- Time zone: UTC+1 (CET)
  - Summer (DST): UTC+2 (CEST)
- Postal code: 357 55
- Website: www.obecbukovany.eu

Bukovany (German: Bukwa, Buckwa) is a municipality and village in Sokolov District in the Karlovy Vary Region of the Czech Republic. It has about 1,500 inhabitants.

== Demographics ==
Historical population
Year	Pop.	±%
1869	542	—
1880	635	+17.2%
1890	754	+18.7%
1900	1,077	+42.8%
1910	1,661	+54.2%
1921	1,597	−3.9%
1930	1,612	+0.9%
1950	820	−49.1%
1961	471	−42.6%
1970	2,082	+342.0%
1980	2,083	+0.0%
1991	1,808	−13.2%
2001	1,840	+1.8%
2011	1,508	−18.0%
2021	1,438	−4.6%
Source: Censuses
