= Dolní Rychnov =

- Municipality
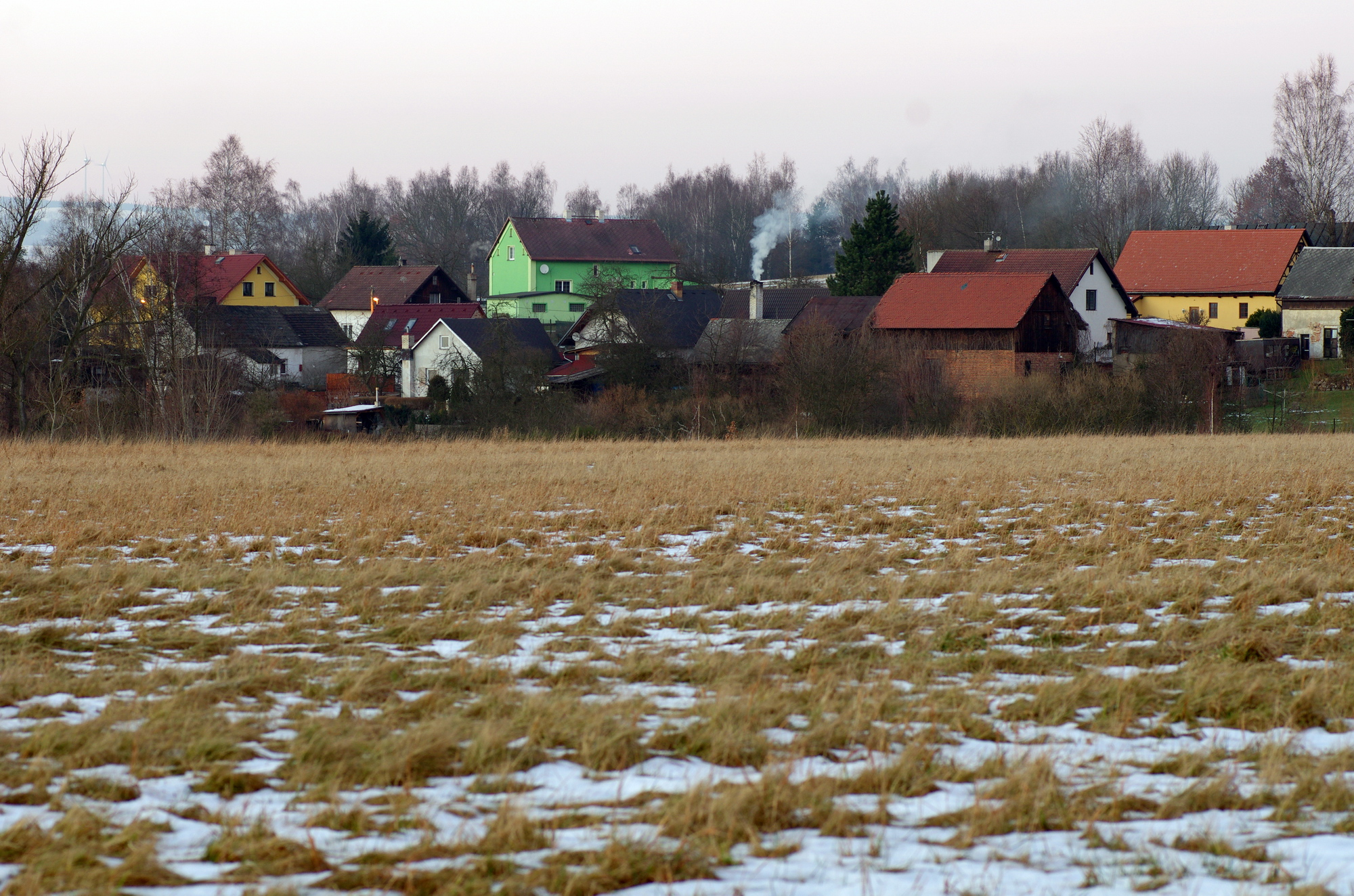
- Southern part of the village

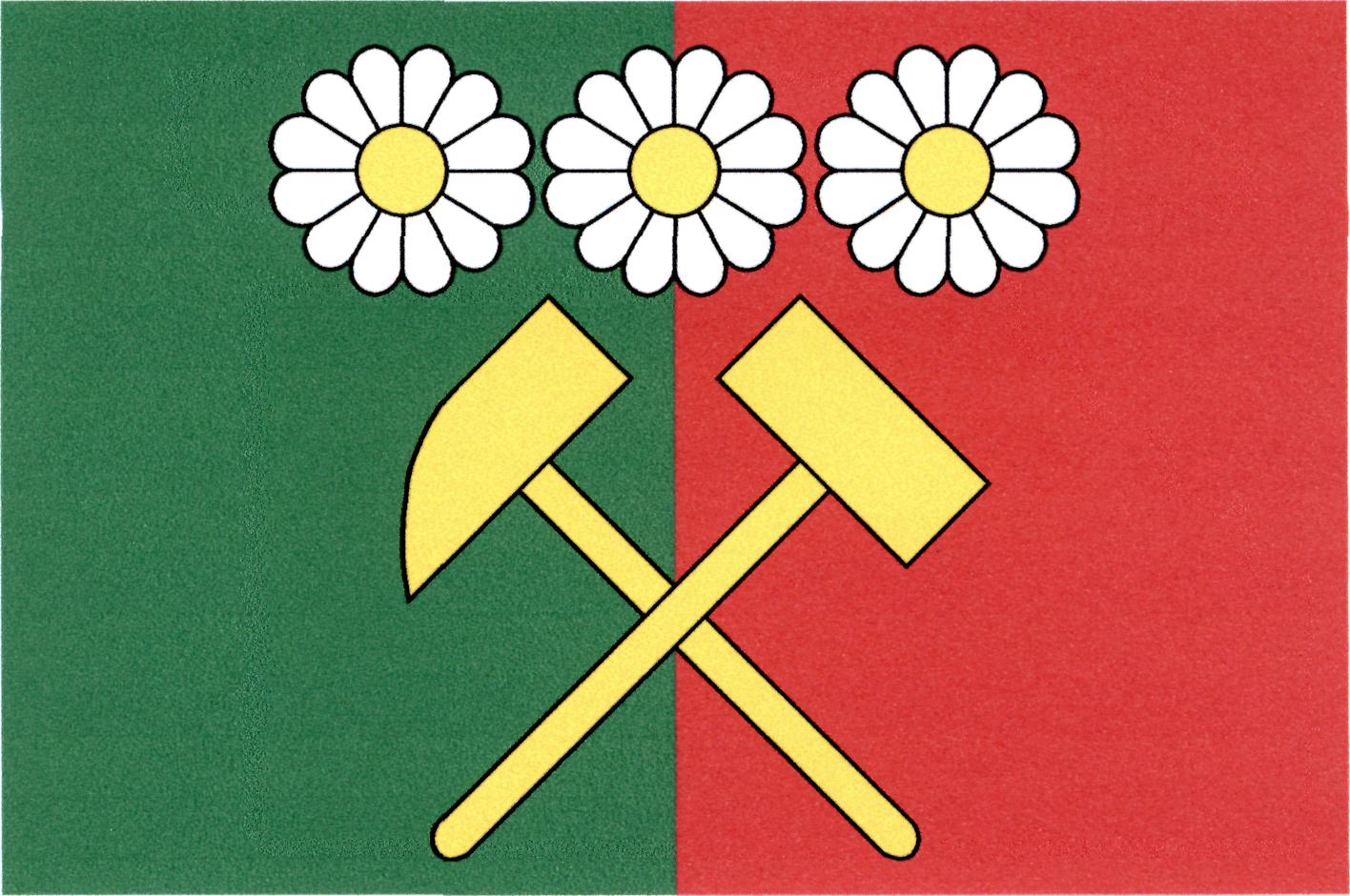
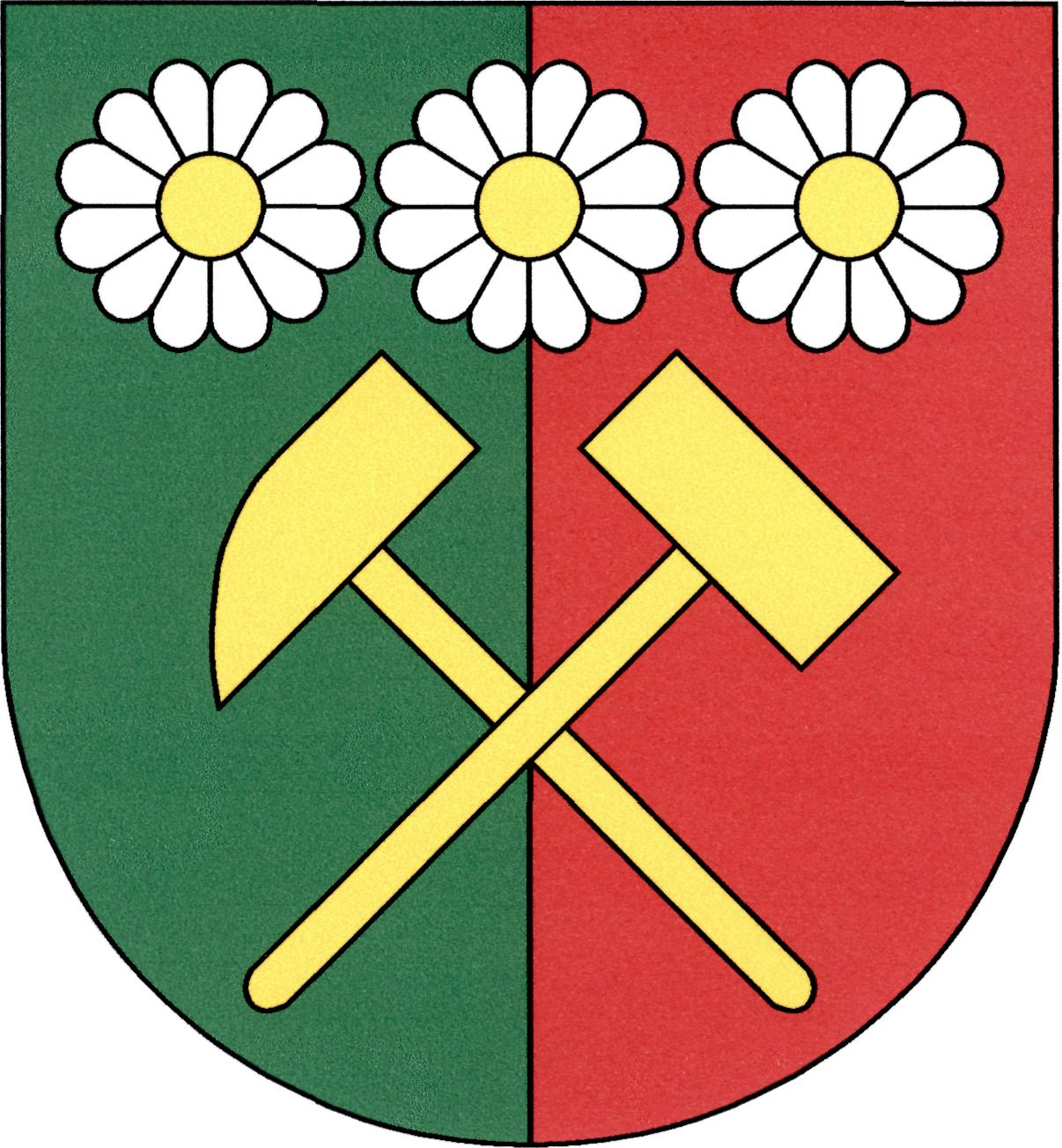
- Flag Coat of arms

- Location in the Czech Republic
- Coordinates: 50°9′53″N 12°38′43″E
- Country: Czech Republic
- Region: Karlovy Vary
- District: Sokolov
- First mentioned: 1309

Area
  - Total: 5.09 km^{2} (1.97 sq mi)
- Elevation: 425 m (1,394 ft)

Population (2026-01-01)
  - Total: 1,280
  - Density: 251/km^{2} (651/sq mi)
- Time zone: UTC+1 (CET)
  - Summer (DST): UTC+2 (CEST)
- Postal code: 356 04
- Website: www.dolnirychnov.cz

Dolní Rychnov (German: Unter Reichenau) is a municipality and village in Sokolov District in the Karlovy Vary Region of the Czech Republic. It has about 1,300 inhabitants.

== Demographics ==
Historical population
Year	Pop.	±%
1869	1,002	—
1880	1,676	+67.3%
1890	2,044	+22.0%
1900	2,331	+14.0%
1910	2,173	−6.8%
1921	2,697	+24.1%
1930	3,629	+34.6%
1950	2,768	−23.7%
1961	2,474	−10.6%
1970	1,879	−24.1%
1980	1,485	−21.0%
1991	1,190	−19.9%
2001	1,245	+4.6%
2011	1,477	+18.6%
2021	1,294	−12.4%
Source: Censuses
