= Rotava =

- Town
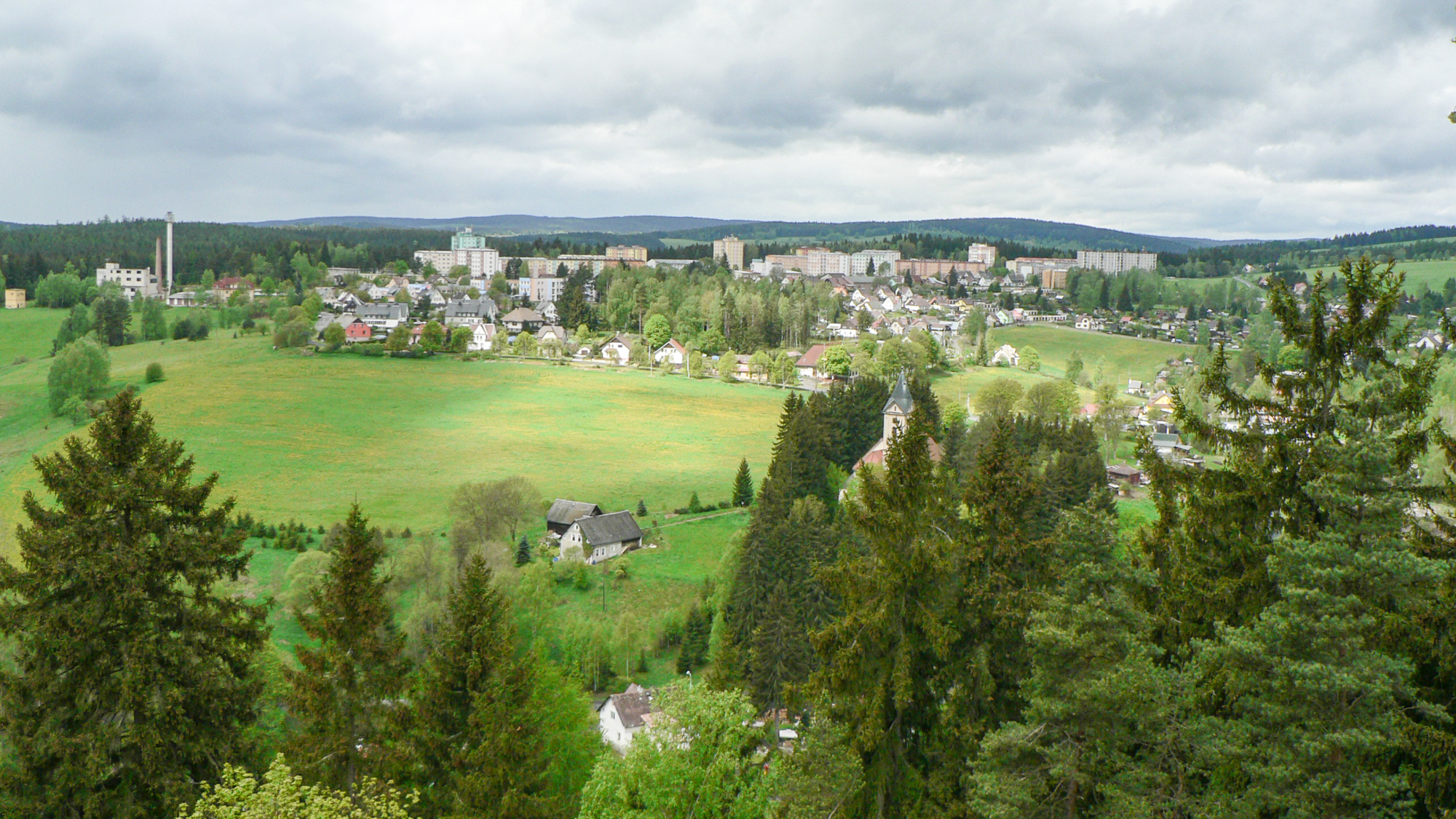
- Skyline of Rotava

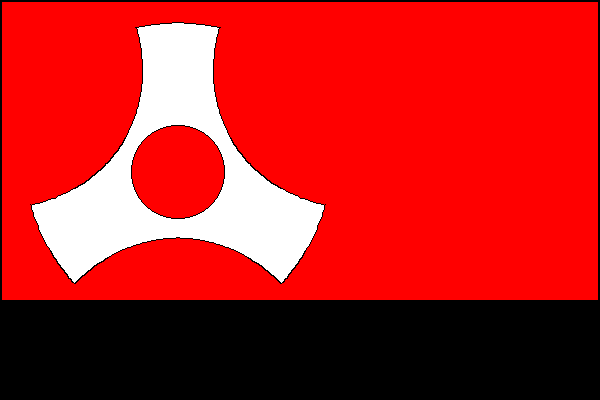
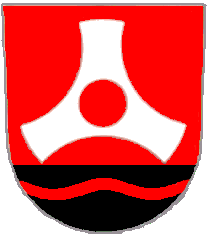
- Flag Coat of arms

- Location in the Czech Republic
- Coordinates: 50°18′11″N 12°33′23″E
- Country: Czech Republic
- Region: Karlovy Vary
- District: Sokolov
- First mentioned: 1552

Government
  - Mayor: Michal Červenka

Area
  - Total: 12.01 km^{2} (4.64 sq mi)
- Elevation: 568 m (1,864 ft)

Population (2026-01-01)
  - Total: 2,753
  - Density: 229.2/km^{2} (593.7/sq mi)
- Time zone: UTC+1 (CET)
  - Summer (DST): UTC+2 (CEST)
- Postal code: 357 01, 357 02
- Website: www.mestorotava.cz

Rotava (Czech pronunciation: [ˈrotava]; German: Rothau) is a town in Sokolov District in the Karlovy Vary Region of the Czech Republic. It has about 2,800 inhabitants. The town is located in the Ore Mountains. Rotava was founded as a mining settlement in the middle of the 16th century.

== Administrative division ==
Rotava consists of two municipal parts (in brackets population according to the 2021 census):

- Rotava (2,583)
- Smolná (53)

== Etymology ==
Rotava was named after the Rotava Stream. The name of the stream was derived from the German word rot ('red') and was originally called Roda.

== Geography ==
Rotava is located about 14 kilometres (9 mi) north of Sokolov and 21 km (13 mi) northwest of Karlovy Vary. It lies in the Ore Mountains. The highest point is the mountain Sklenský vrch at 817 m (2,680 ft) above sea level. The Svatava River flows along the western municipal border. The Rotava Stream flows along the eastern and southern border and then joins the Svatava.

== History ==
Iron ore was mined in the area from 1543. The first written mention of Rotava is from 1552, when there was a hamlet with a hammer mill. Until 1628, the area was owned by the Schlick family. For the next centuries, it was property of the Nostitz family. The municipality of Rotava was created in the 19th century by merger of several settlements. The establishment of a bar iron rolling mill in 1861 brought significant development in Rotava.

== Demographics ==
Historical population

Year	Pop.	±%
1869	2,248	—
1880	2,341	+4.1%
1890	2,572	+9.9%
1900	3,213	+24.9%
1910	4,439	+38.2%

Year	Pop.	±%
1921	4,563	+2.8%
1930	4,695	+2.9%
1950	1,477	−68.5%
1961	1,883	+27.5%
1970	4,110	+118.3%

Year	Pop.	±%
1980	3,784	−7.9%
1991	3,433	−9.3%
2001	3,449	+0.5%
2011	3,145	−8.8%
2021	2,636	−16.2%

Source: Censuses

== Transport ==
There are no railways or major roads passing through the municipal territory.

== Sights ==
The main landmark of Rotava is the Church of Saints Peter and Paul. It is a modern church, built in 1914–1925.

The only protected cultural monument in the town is a late Baroque rural house. It dates from the end of the 18th century. The house is a rare example of folk architecture with elements that are atypical for this region. The wooden barn next to the house was built around 1736.

== Twin towns – sister cities ==
Rotava is twinned with:

- Veitshöchheim, Germany
