= Šindelová =

- Municipality
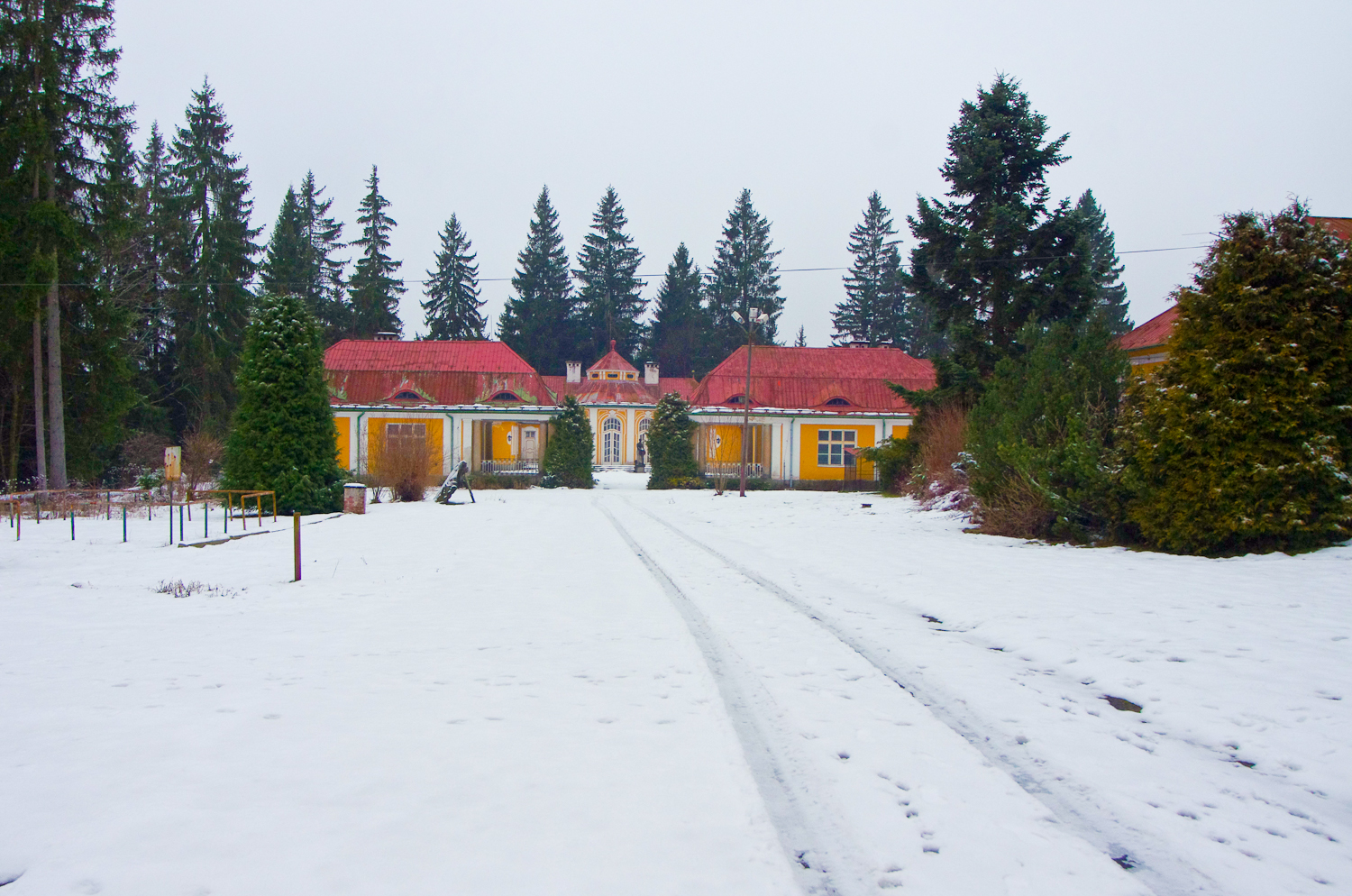
- Favorit hunting lodge

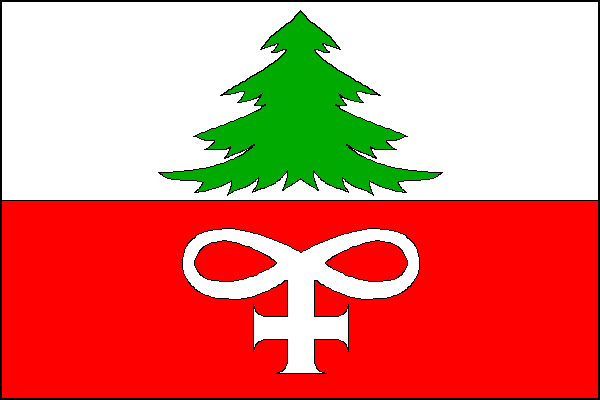
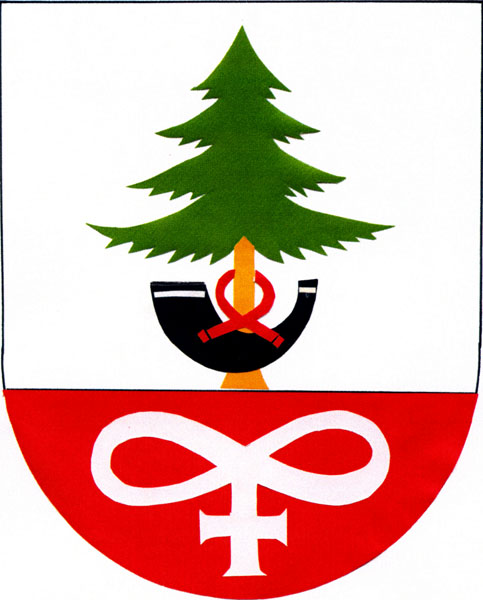
- Flag Coat of arms

- Location in the Czech Republic
- Coordinates: 50°19′8″N 12°36′12″E
- Country: Czech Republic
- Region: Karlovy Vary
- District: Sokolov
- First mentioned: 1584

Area
  - Total: 38.31 km^{2} (14.79 sq mi)
- Elevation: 598 m (1,962 ft)

Population (2026-01-01)
  - Total: 296
  - Density: 7.73/km^{2} (20.0/sq mi)
- Time zone: UTC+1 (CET)
  - Summer (DST): UTC+2 (CEST)
- Postal code: 358 01
- Website: www.sindelova.cz

Šindelová (German: Schindlwald) is a municipality and village in Sokolov District in the Karlovy Vary Region of the Czech Republic. It has about 300 inhabitants.

== Administrative division ==
Šindelová consists of three municipal parts (in brackets population according to the 2021 census):

- Šindelová (145)
- Krásná Lípa (104)
- Obora (60)

== Demographics ==
Historical population
Year	Pop.	±%
1869	3,739	—
1880	3,580	−4.3%
1890	3,444	−3.8%
1900	3,486	+1.2%
1910	3,646	+4.6%
1921	3,514	−3.6%
1930	3,509	−0.1%
1950	499	−85.8%
1961	500	+0.2%
1970	367	−26.6%
1980	249	−32.2%
1991	223	−10.4%
2001	256	+14.8%
2011	271	+5.9%
2021	309	+14.0%
Source: Censuses
