= Stříbrná =

- Municipality
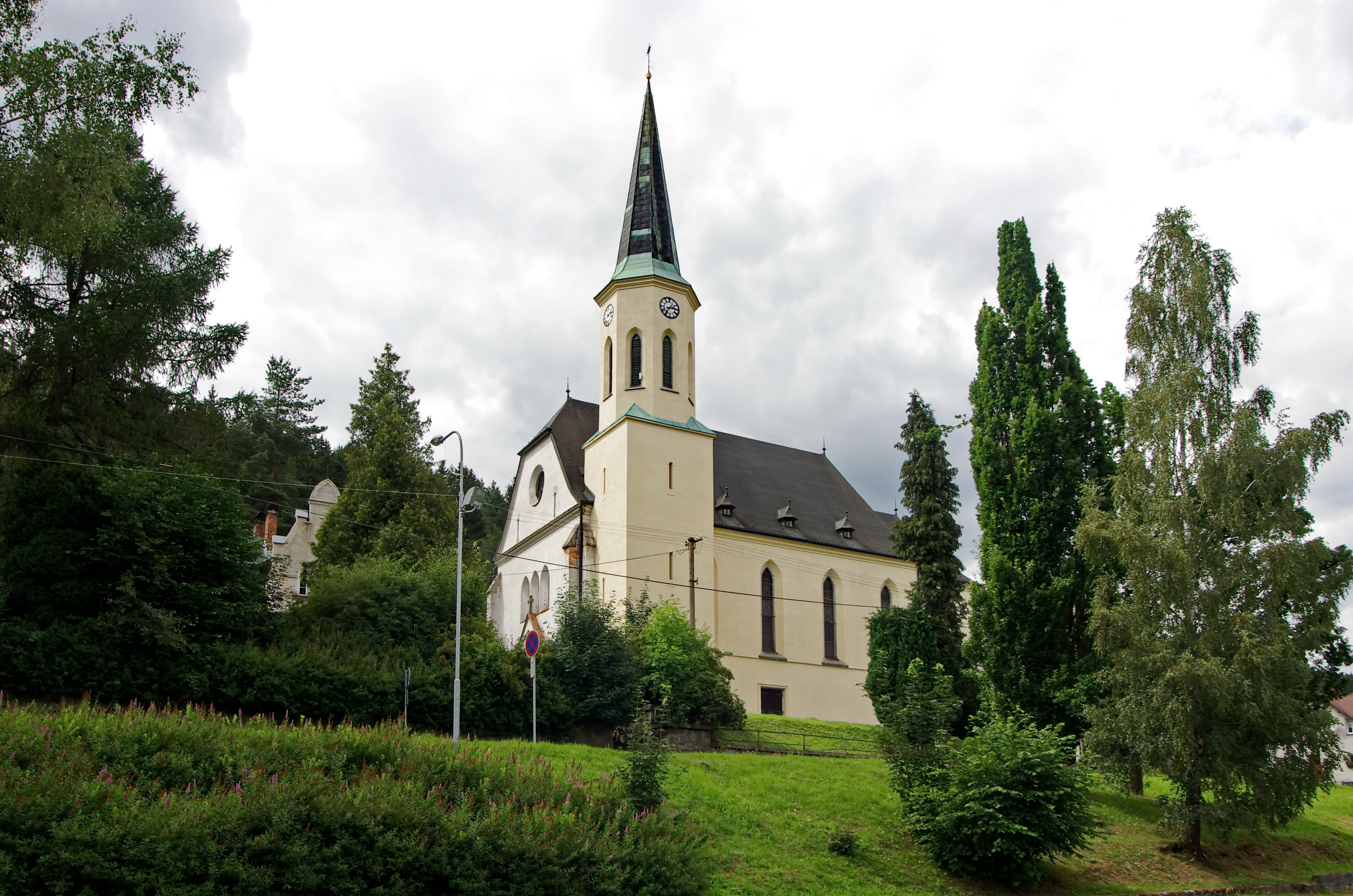
- Church of the Sacred Heart

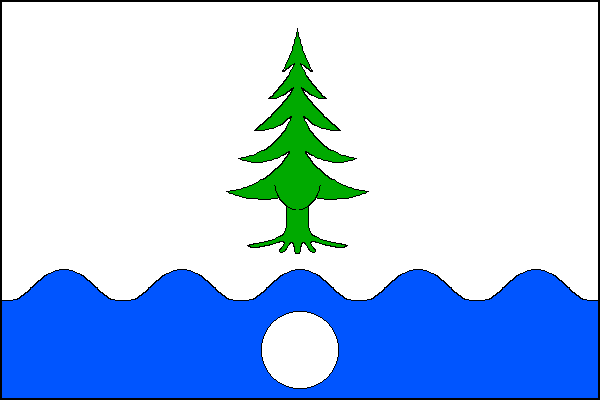
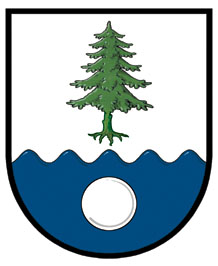
- Flag Coat of arms

- Location in the Czech Republic
- Coordinates: 50°21′24″N 12°31′35″E
- Country: Czech Republic
- Region: Karlovy Vary
- District: Sokolov
- First mentioned: 1601

Area
  - Total: 33.52 km^{2} (12.94 sq mi)
- Elevation: 448 m (1,470 ft)

Population (2026-01-01)
  - Total: 449
  - Density: 13.4/km^{2} (34.7/sq mi)
- Time zone: UTC+1 (CET)
  - Summer (DST): UTC+2 (CEST)
- Postal code: 358 01
- Website: stribrna.cz

Stříbrná (German: Silberbach) is a municipality and village in Sokolov District in the Karlovy Vary Region of the Czech Republic. It has about 400 inhabitants.

== History ==
The first written mention of Stříbrná is from 1601.

== Demographics ==
Historical population
Year	Pop.	±%
1869	2,764	—
1880	3,218	+16.4%
1890	3,204	−0.4%
1900	3,971	+23.9%
1910	4,868	+22.6%
1921	4,279	−12.1%
1930	4,526	+5.8%
1950	762	−83.2%
1961	911	+19.6%
1970	655	−28.1%
1980	523	−20.2%
1991	401	−23.3%
2001	432	+7.7%
2011	418	−3.2%
2021	483	+15.6%
Source: Censuses
