= Těšovice (Sokolov District) =

- Municipality
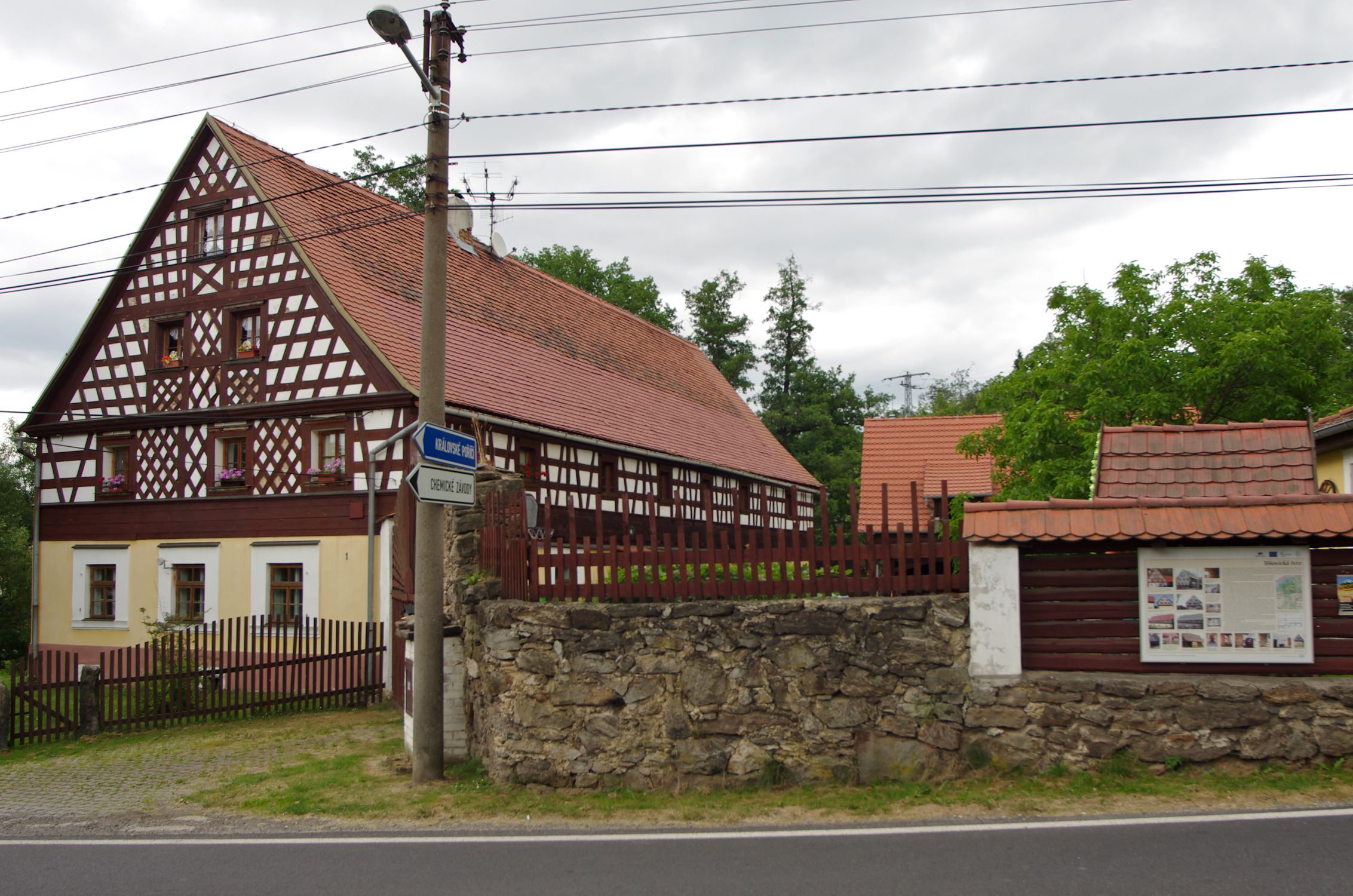
- Half-timbered farmhouse

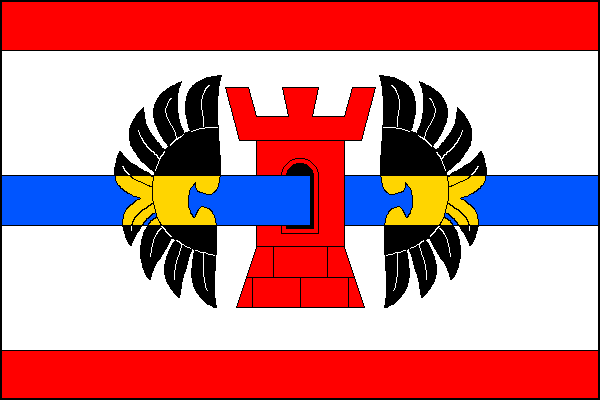
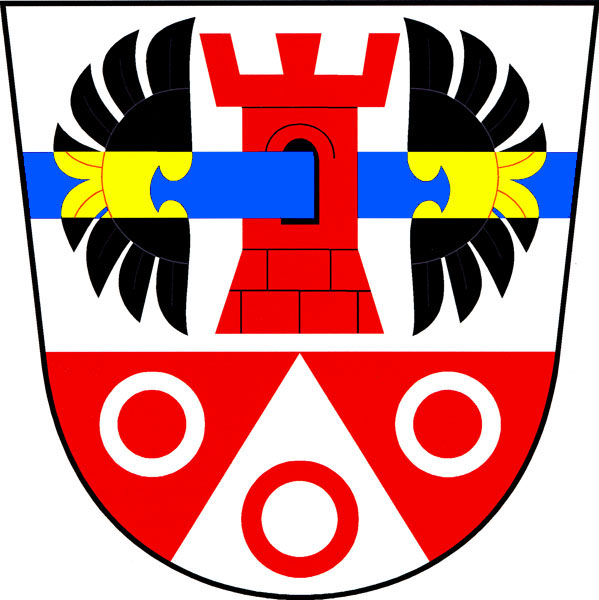
- Flag Coat of arms

- Location in the Czech Republic
- Coordinates: 50°10′56″N 12°40′37″E
- Country: Czech Republic
- Region: Karlovy Vary
- District: Sokolov
- First mentioned: 1394

Area
  - Total: 1.19 km^{2} (0.46 sq mi)
- Elevation: 402 m (1,319 ft)

Population (2026-01-01)
  - Total: 265
  - Density: 223/km^{2} (577/sq mi)
- Time zone: UTC+1 (CET)
  - Summer (DST): UTC+2 (CEST)
- Postal code: 356 01
- Website: www.obectesovice.cz

Těšovice (German: Teschwitz) is a municipality and village in Sokolov District in the Karlovy Vary Region of the Czech Republic. It has about 300 inhabitants.

== Demographics ==
Historical population
Year	Pop.	±%
1869	90	—
1880	123	+36.7%
1890	98	−20.3%
1900	116	+18.4%
1910	125	+7.8%
1921	220	+76.0%
1930	538	+144.5%
1950	367	−31.8%
1961	325	−11.4%
1970	265	−18.5%
1980	303	+14.3%
1991	190	−37.3%
2001	140	−26.3%
2011	176	+25.7%
2021	261	+48.3%
Source: Censuses
