= Kaceřov (Sokolov District) =

- Municipality
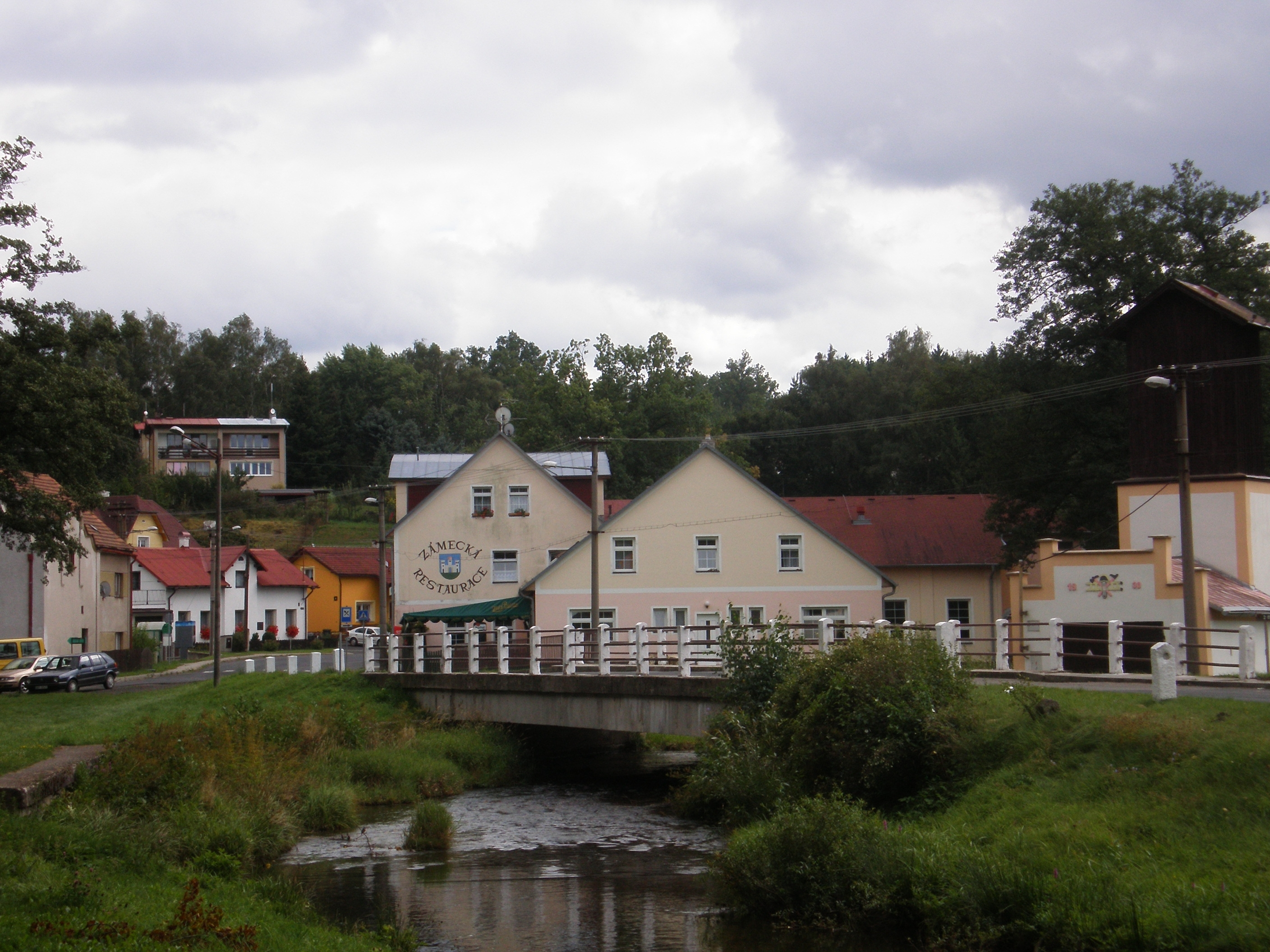
- Centre of Kaceřov

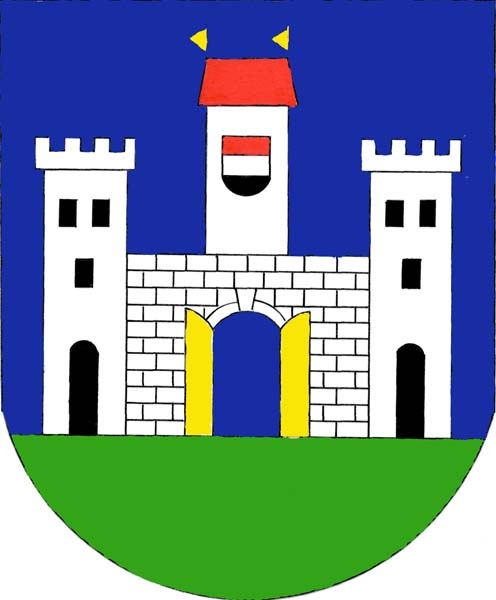
- Flag Coat of arms

- Location in the Czech Republic
- Coordinates: 50°8′57″N 12°30′16″E
- Country: Czech Republic
- Region: Karlovy Vary
- District: Sokolov
- First mentioned: 1312

Area
  - Total: 5.72 km^{2} (2.21 sq mi)
- Elevation: 427 m (1,401 ft)

Population (2026-01-01)
  - Total: 404
  - Density: 70.6/km^{2} (183/sq mi)
- Time zone: UTC+1 (CET)
  - Summer (DST): UTC+2 (CEST)
- Postal code: 357 51
- Website: www.kacerov.cz

Kaceřov (German: Katzengrün) is a municipality and village in Sokolov District in the Karlovy Vary Region of the Czech Republic. It has about 400 inhabitants.

== Administrative division ==
Kaceřov consists of two municipal parts (in brackets population according to the 2021 census):

- Kaceřov (237)
- Horní Pochlovice (151)

== Etymology ==
The name Kaceřov is derived from the surname Kacíř, meaning "Kacíř's (court)". In Old Czech, the name was written as Kacieřov.

== Geography ==
Kaceřov is located about 11 kilometres (7 mi) west of Sokolov and 26 km (16 mi) southwest of Karlovy Vary. It lies on the border of the Cheb Basin and Sokolov Basin. The highest point is the hill Bučina at 501 m (1,644 ft) above sea level. The stream Libocký potok flows through the municipality.

== History ==
The first written mention of Kaceřov is from 1312, when it was acquired by the Waldsassen Abbey. The most important owners of the estate were the Pergler of Perglas family. They held Kaceřov from the 1470s until the end of the 18th century.

== Demographics ==
Historical population

Year	Pop.	±%
1869	635	—
1880	584	−8.0%
1890	537	−8.0%
1900	557	+3.7%
1910	691	+24.1%

Year	Pop.	±%
1921	701	+1.4%
1930	781	+11.4%
1950	454	−41.9%
1961	697	+53.5%
1970	504	−27.7%

Year	Pop.	±%
1980	411	−18.5%
1991	391	−4.9%
2001	432	+10.5%
2011	420	−2.8%
2021	388	−7.6%

Source: Censuses

== Transport ==
There are no railways or major roads passing through the municipality.

== Sights ==
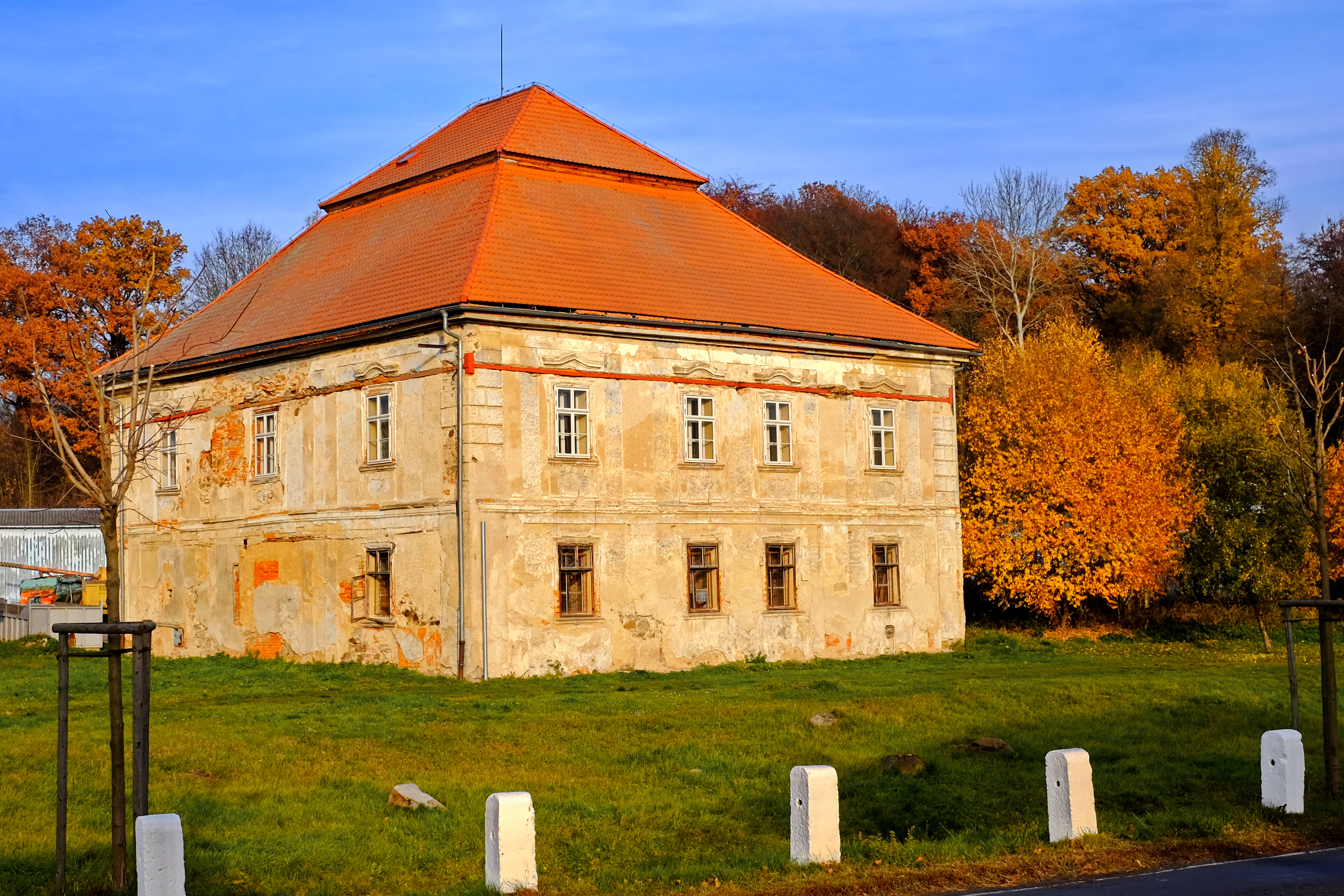
Kaceřov Castle

The most important monument is the Kaceřov Castle with a park and a castle fishpond. It is an example of a one-storey Baroque rural feudal residence. The oldest monument in the municipality is the torso of a Marian column. Other smaller monuments are the statue of Saint Anthony of Padua from 1719 and the late Baroque column of the Holy Trinity from 1777.
