= Citice =

- Municipality
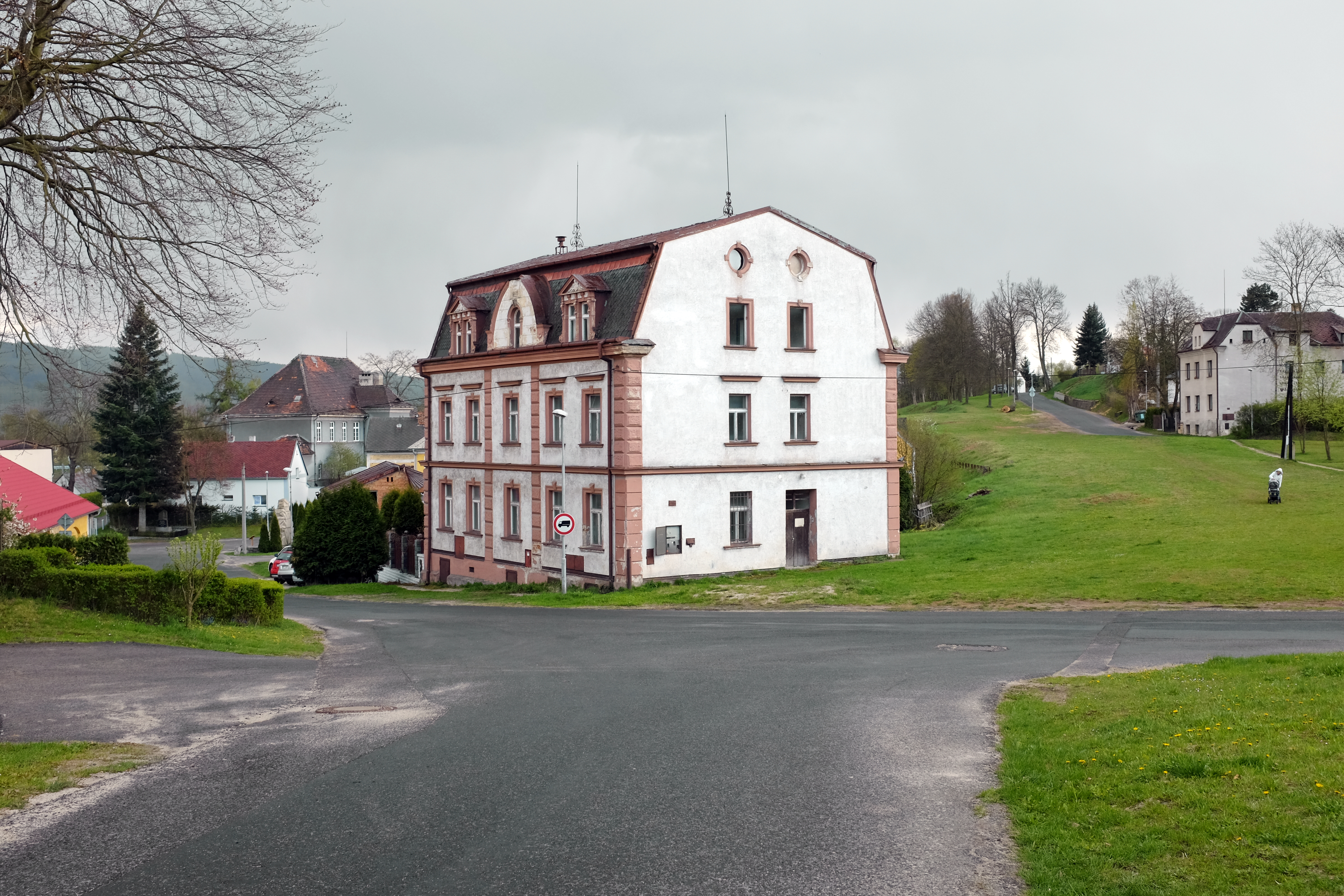
- Centre of the village

- Flag Coat of arms

- Location in the Czech Republic
- Coordinates: 50°9′46″N 12°36′48″E
- Country: Czech Republic
- Region: Karlovy Vary
- District: Sokolov
- First mentioned: 1370

Area
  - Total: 5.41 km^{2} (2.09 sq mi)
- Elevation: 420 m (1,380 ft)

Population (2026-01-01)
  - Total: 838
  - Density: 155/km^{2} (401/sq mi)
- Time zone: UTC+1 (CET)
  - Summer (DST): UTC+2 (CEST)
- Postal code: 357 56
- Website: www.citice.cz

Citice (German: Zieditz) is a municipality and village in Sokolov District in the Karlovy Vary Region of the Czech Republic. It has about 800 inhabitants.

== Administrative division ==
Citice consists of two municipal parts (in brackets population according to the 2021 census):

- Citice (677)
- Hlavno (158)

== Demographics ==
Historical population
Year	Pop.	±%
1869	535	—
1880	746	+39.4%
1890	995	+33.4%
1900	1,436	+44.3%
1910	1,825	+27.1%
1921	2,036	+11.6%
1930	2,147	+5.5%
1950	1,473	−31.4%
1961	1,177	−20.1%
1970	1,157	−1.7%
1980	970	−16.2%
1991	825	−14.9%
2001	855	+3.6%
2011	838	−2.0%
2021	835	−0.4%
Source: Censuses

== Notable people ==
- Erich Kühnhackl (born 1950), German ice hockey player and coach
