= German exonyms (Karlovy Vary Region) =

This is a list of German language place names in Bohemia, now exonyms for towns and villages in the Karlovy Vary Region of the Czech Republic.

- Aš Asch
- Bečov nad Teplou Petschau
- Březová Prösau
- Cheb Eger
- Chodov Chodau
- Františkovy Lázně Franzensbad
- Habartov Haberspirk
- Horní Slavkov Schlaggenwald
- Hranice Roßbach
- Hrozňatov Altkinsberg (until 1946 Kynšperk)
- Jáchymov Joachimsthal
- Karlovy Vary Karlsbad
- Kraslice Graslitz
- Kynšperk nad Ohří Königsberg a.d. Eger
- Lázně Kynžvart Bad Königswart
- Loket Ellbogen
- Luby Schönbach
- Mariánské Lázně Marienbad
- Nejdek Neudeck
- Nová Role Neu Rohlau
- Nové Sedlo Neusattl
- Ostrov Schlackenwerth
- Plesná Fleißen
- Rotava Rothau
- Skalná Wildstein
- Sokolov Falkenau
- Teplá Stadt Tepl
- Toužim Theusing
- Valeč Waltsch
- Žlutice Luditz
