= List of subcamps of Flossenbürg =

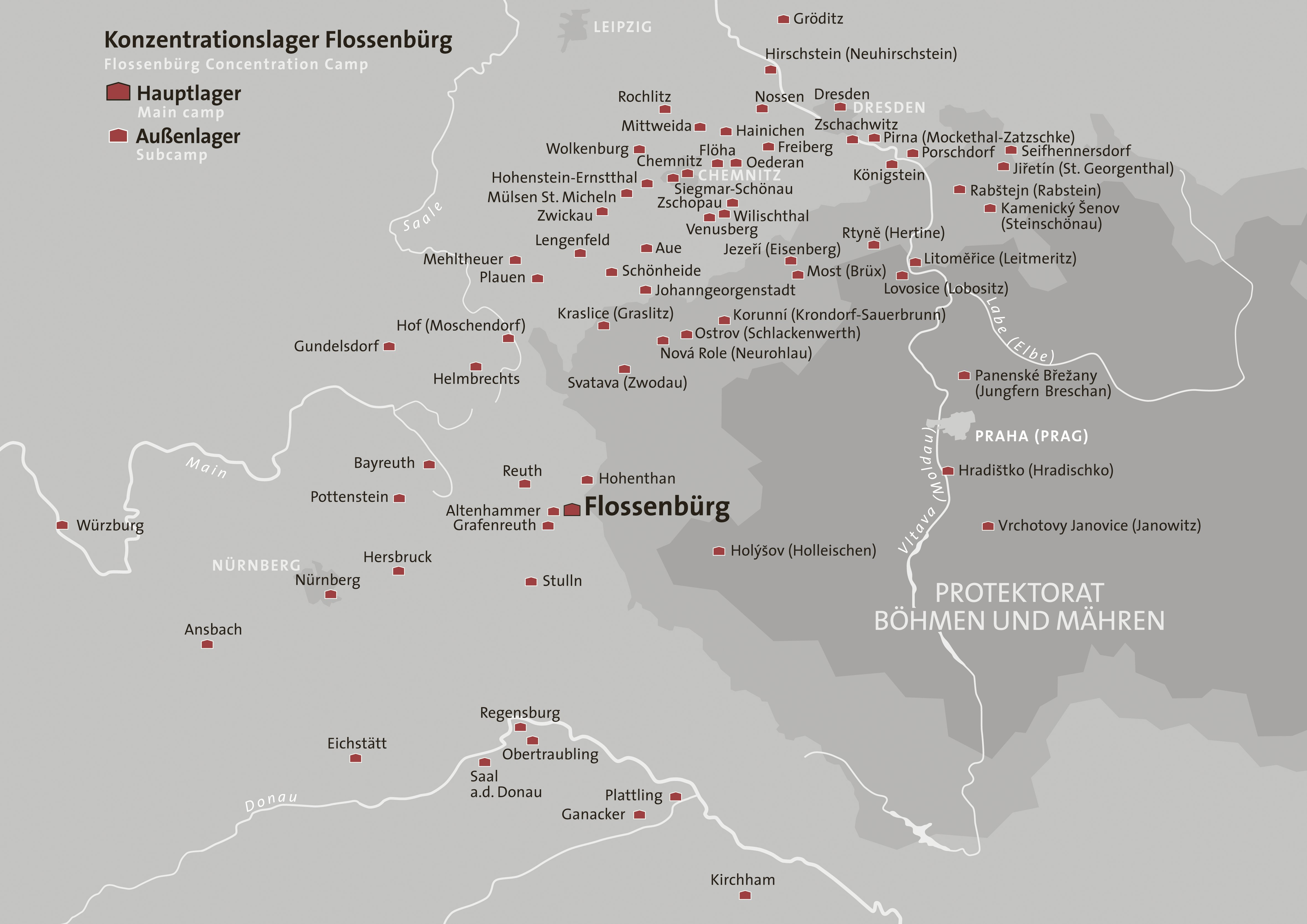

The expansion of Flossenbürg concentration camp led to the establishment of subcamps, the first of which was established at Stulln in February 1942 to provide forced labor to a mining company. Many of them were located in the Sudetenland or across the border in the Protectorate of Bohemia and Moravia. The vast majority were established after 1 March 1944. Initially, the subcamps were not involved in armaments production, which changed in the second half of 1944 due to a large influx of available prisoners and the activities of the Jägerstab, which sought to increase German aircraft production. The Jägerstab's dispersal of aircraft production spurred the expansion of the subcamp system in 1944 and resulted in the establishment of the two largest of the subcamps, at Hersbruck and Leitmeritz. In the second half of 1944, 45 new camps were created, compared to three camps in the previous six months. The staffing these new camps was increasingly filled by Luftwaffe soldiers, Volksdeutsche SS men (ethnic Germans from outside the Reich), and SS women, for the subcamps containing female prisoners. By April 1945, 80% of the prisoners were at the subcamps. Of all the concentration camp systems, Flossenbürg's subcamp system was one of the three most important to the economy of Nazi Germany, along with those of Dachau and Mauthausen.

== List of subcamps ==
Name	Image	Location	Dates of operation	Prisoners	Deaths	Description
Altenhammer		Altenhammer, Bavaria 49°43′50.9″N 12°19′35.0″E	Late 1944 or early 1945–16 April 1945	552 (March 1945)	More than 45	Began in 1942 as a work detachment from Flossenbürg main camp, 2 kilometres (1.2 mi) away, for the Ernst Stich Quarry. In 1944, production lines for parts of the Messerschmitt Bf 109 fighter were established and initially manned by prisoners from the main camp. The barracks were built and prisoners moved in around the end of 1944. The camp was guarded mostly by Luftwaffe guards and conditions were poor. On 16 April 1945 the prisoners were transferred back to the main camp.
Ansbach		Rezathalle, Ansbach, Bavaria 49°43′50.9″N 12°19′35″E	13 March – 4 April 1945	700	72	Prisoners were held in the Rezathalle fair pavilion and worked at repairing bomb damage to the nearby rail lines. Rations were very low which contributed to the death rate. On 4 April, 93 prisoners were sent to Hersbruck while the rest were sent back to the main camp.
Aue		Aue, Saxony 49°4′59.884″N 11°16′0.116″E	24 November 1944 – late April 1945	20	None	Skilled Hungarian Jews worked on a project to build an SS leadership training school.
Bayreuth		Bayreuth, Bavaria 49°57′0″N 11°34′59.876″E	13 June 1944 – 11 April 1945	63	None at the camp. Eleven died as a result of their imprisonment.	Prisoners, who had been selected for their skills at Neuengamme, worked at the "Institute of Physical Research", under the leadership of physicist Werner Rambauske to develop remote-controlled bombs at the New Cotton Mill owned by Bodo Lafferentz. Conditions were relatively good, but the role of the Wagner family in the subcamp has attracted interest.
Brüx		Brüx, Reichsgau Sudetenland (now Most, Czech Republic) 50°31′0.48″N 13°31′53.8″E	1 September – 7 October 1944	1,000	4	1,000 prisoners arrived on 1 September on a transport from Sachsenhausen. Little is known of the conditions, although prisoners probably worked in coal mines and tank production. On 7 October, they were transferred back to the Flossenbürg main camp and thence to Leitmeritz.
Chemnitz		Chemnitz, Saxony 50°49′59.9″N 12°55′0.12″E	24 October 1944 – 8 May 1945	510	2	The prisoners, all women who had been transported from Auschwitz, produced metal parts for airplanes and machine guns for Astrawerke, 12-hour days six days a week. Nutrition was lacking but the physical brutality of guards was less than elsewhere.
Dresden Behelfsheim		Dresden, Saxony 51°3′3.6″N 13°44′0.96″E	12 April 1945 –	103	Unknown	Many of the prisoners were in poor health due to previous imprisonment.
Dresden Bernsdorf		Dresden, Saxony 51°2′31.553″N 13°47′50.6″E	24 November 1944 – 14 April 1945	500	16 from mistreatment and additional victims of bombing of Dresden and executions	Most prisoners were Polish Jews who came from the Łódź Ghetto via Stutthof. Already in bad condition, they suffered from poor living conditions and forced labor producing machine guns for Bernsdorf & Co. After the bombing of Dresden on 13 February, the prisoners were sent to Mockethal except 50 men who were forced to clear bomb debris.
Dresden (SS Engineers' Barracks)		Dresden, Saxony 51°5′31.196″N 13°43′47.64″E	June 1942 – 15 April 1945	198 (December 1943)	3–7	This was the second and longest-lasting of the Flossenbürg subcamps. Prisoners worked mostly on construction for the SS-Bauleitung Dresden but were also drafted for other construction projects and sold to private firms.
Dresden Universelle		Dresden, Saxony 51°2′24.36″N 13°42′56.88″E	9 October 1944 – mid-April 1945	700	3	Many of the women in the camp had already spent years in other concentration camps. In Dresden, they worked and slept in the same building at 14 Florastrasse, a supplier for Junkers aircraft company. During the bombing of Dresden, some women may have died and others managed to escape, while the remainder were taken to Mockethal and returned in mid-March, at which point they worked in clearing debris.
Dresden Goehle-Werk		Dresden, Saxony 51°4′40″N 13°43′39″E	9 October 1944 – mid-April 1945	600	2	Female prisoners, mostly Russian and Polish, worked on producing time fuses, incendiary fragmentation projectiles for antiaircraft cannons, and other weapons. Food rations were insufficient and the female SS guards frequently beat prisoners. In mid-April they were deported to Leitmeritz but all escaped near the Sudeten border.
Dresden-Reick		Dresden, Saxony 51°00′34″N 13°48′33″E	October 1944		23	There were three murders. The rest of the deaths came mostly from ill Jewish prisoners who were in poor condition due to previous imprisonment at Auschwitz and Bergen-Belsen.
Dresden-Friedrichstadt		Dresden-Friedrichstadt station, Dresden, Saxony 51°03′36″N 13°41′33″E	12 September 1944–late February 1945	597 (November 1944)	89	Prisoners had to repair damaged railroad cars for RAW. Food was inadequate while the SS guards severely mistreated prisoners. Some were shot “while attempting to escape”.
Dresden Reichsbahn		Dresden-Friedrichstadt station, Dresden, Saxony 51°03′36″N 13°41′33″E	24 March–May 1945	500		Prisoners worked also for RAW and lived in five-tiered bunk beds near the railroad station hall. The unsanitary conditions led municipal authorities to fear a typhus epidemic.
Eichstätt		Willibaldsburg Castle, Eichstätt, Bavaria 48°53′40.92″N 11°10′7.68″E	October 1944 – January 1945	22	None	The prisoners—Dutch, Polish, and Czech—worked for Nuremberg SS Signal Reserve Battalion and stayed in Willibaldsburg Castle.
Eisenberg		Eisenberg Castle, Reichsgau Sudetenland (now Jezeří Castle in the Czech Republic) 50°33′14.94″N 13°30′17.86″E	21 June 1943 – 27 April 1945	30	None	Most prisoners worked in the kitchen for a POW camp for French officers located at the same site. After the SS guards left, the prisoners left the castle and walked to the front line with the United States Army.
Falkenau		Falkenau an der Eger, Reichsgau Sudetenland (now Sokolov, Czech Republic) 50°10′59.88″N 12°37′59.876″E	December 1943 – around July 1944	750	None	Women from a variety of countries produced aircraft parts for Ignaz Schmieger AG. From March 1944, they also built the barracks that would become Zwodau concentration camp. Conditions, especially food, were better than elsewhere, and the women lived in a textile factory. There were 18 Luftwaffe guards and 21 SS women.
Flöha		Flöha, Saxony 50°50′54″N 13°04′53″E	18 March 1944 – 14 April 1945	611 (February 1945)	42 at the camp	Prisoners, mostly Russian and French men, worked for the Flöha Tüllfabrik, which had been turned over to production by Erla Maschinenwerk, an aircraft manufacturer, in order to disperse production. Some skilled prisoners deliberately sabotaged production despite the risk to themesleves. Fifty-seven prisoners were executed during a death march towards Theresienstadt.
Freiberg		Freiberg, Saxony 50°55′0.1″N 13°22′0.1″E	31 August 1944 – 14 April 1945	1002	At least 5	The prisoners, mostly Polish Jewish women, arrived on three transports from Auschwitz. They worked for Arado, an aircraft manufacturer. Conditions were fairly good until they were moved to purpose-built barracks in December 1944, but the nutrition was inadequate. In April 1945, remaining prisoners were evacuated to Mauthausen concentration camp.
Ganacker		Ganacker, Bavaria 48°42′53″N 12°43′34″E	21 February 1945 – 24 or 25 April 1945	500–900	183	Prisoners worked for the Luftwaffe at Ganacker airfield. Initially, they were housed at the airfield, but later they moved to improvised tents in a forest clearing 2 kilometers (1.2 miles) away. Poor housing, insufficient food, as well as a contaminated water supply caused many deaths. Forty-five prisoners, too weak to be moved, were murdered during the evacuation of the camp. Other prisoners died during the death march towards Traunstein.
Grafenreuth		Grafenreuth, Bavaria 49°42′0″N 12°18′9.72″E	June 1943–20 or 21 April 1945	150 (August 1944)	One	Prisoners worked on the nearby Weiden-Floss-Eslarn railway, unloading cars, and others built a clothing factory operated by the SS. The first SS commander, Kübler, embezzled prisoner rations and beat them; his successor Voigt tried to ensure that prisoners were not mistreated. Sick prisoners were transported to Flossenbürg where some died.
Graslitz		Graslitz, Reichsgau Sudetenland (now Kraslice, Czech Republic) 50°19′59.884″N 12°31′0.116″E	7 August 1944	877 (April 1945)	None at the camp	Prisoners, many of whom were Romani, did forced labor for Luftfahrtgerätewerk Hakenfelde GmbH, a subsidiary of Siemens which produced aircraft parts including navigation equipment, flight instruments, and electronics. Some prisoners had to clear bomb debris from the railway station in early 1945.
Gröditz		Gröditz, Saxony 51°13′0.124″N 14°37′0.120″E	27 September 1944 – 17 April 1945	743 (April 1945)	220 as a result of camp conditions, 184 in a massacre	Prisoners worked and were quartered in the Mitteldeutsche Stahlwerke factory, which operated on the principle of "extermination through work"—conditions were intended to cause the death of prisoners. On 17 April, 184 prisoners deemed unable to march were shot in the Koselitz sandpits nearby; the remainder were marched to Leitmeritz and Theresienstadt.
Gundelsdorf		Gundelsdorf, Bavaria 50°17′5.057″N 11°18′6.167″E	12 September 1944 – 13 April 1945	121	2 and the camp, 18 at Flossenbürg (all men)	Most of the prisoners were Polish Jewish women from Kraków-Płaszów concentration camp; in November 1944, 21 Jewish men arrived. Prisoners were forced to build camp barracks, load and unload trains, and work for an aerial intelligence unit which had been relocated from Płaszów.
Hainichen		Hainichen, Saxony 50°58′10.034″N 13°7′19.556″E	8 September 1944 – mid-April 1945	500	5 at the camp, others died during and after the death march	The prisoners were mostly Polish and Hungarian Jewish women from Transylvania and Carpathian Ruthenia, who were forced to work for Framo producing machine guns, launchers and mortars. The company paid the SS 4 Reichsmarks daily per prisoner, a total of 42,526 RM. Many of the guards were members of the Russian Liberation Army. In April 1945, they were evacuated to Theresienstadt.
Happurg		Happurg, Bavaria 49°30′0″N 11°28′0.116″E				
Helmbrechts		Helmbrechts, Bavaria 50°13′54″N 11°42′34″E				
Hersbruck		Hersbruck, Bavaria 49°30′42.8″N 11°26′37″E				
Hertine		Hertine, Reichsgau Sudetenland (now Rtyně nad Bílinou, Czech Republic) 50°36′14″N 13°53′18″E				
Hof-Moschendorf		Hof, Bavaria 50°17′40″N 11°56′06″E				
Hohenstein-Ernstthal		Hohenstein-Ernstthal, Saxony 50°47′52″N 12°42′47″E				
Hohenthan		Hohenthan, Bavaria 49°47′59″N 12°23′04″E	14 February – 22 April 1945	6	None	
Holleischen		Holleischen, Reichsgau Sudetenland (now Holýšov, Czech Republic) 49°36′21″N 13°05′54″E			11	The men's camp was dissolved in January 1945 while the women's camp was liberated by Czech partisans on 3 May 1945.
Hradischko		Hradischko, Protectorate of Bohemia and Moravia (now Hradištko, Czech Republic) 49°52′03″N 14°25′21″E				
Janowitz		Janowitz, Protectorate of Bohemia and Moravia (now Vrchotovy Janovice, Czech Republic) 49°40′17″N 14°34′21″E	24 July 1944 – end of March 1945	200	Unknown; numerous prisoners were killed during the evacuation	Prisoners built facilities for an SS assault-gun school, worked in a quarry, unloaded railway wagons, built a second platform at Čichovka station and repaired roads. After a typhus epidemic they were moved to a farm near Křepenice. The survivors were liberated by Czech partisans near Kaplice on 8 May 1945.
Johanngeorgenstadt		Johanngeorgenstadt, Saxony 50°25′52″N 12°43′37.6″E				
Jungfern-Breschan		Jungfern-Breschan, Protectorate of Bohemia and Moravia (now Panenské Břežany, Czech Republic) 50°12′59″N 14°26′32″E	14 February 1944 – 8 May 1945			Liberated by the Red Army on 8 May 1945.
Kirchham		Kirchham, Bavaria 48°22′03″N 13°17′06″E				
Königstein		Königstein Fortress, Königstein, Saxony 50°55′8″N 14°3′24″E	15 November 1944 – 17 March 1945			
Krondorf-Sauerbrunn		Krondorf, Reichsgau Sudetenland (now Korunní, Czech Republic) 50°20′24″N 13°4′15.6″E				Forced labor for Sudetenquell GmbH.
Leitmeritz		Leitmeritz, Reichsgau Sudetenland (now Litoměřice, Czech Republic) 50°32′28″N 14°06′44″E	24 March 1944 – 8 May 1945	9,000 (April 1945)	4,500	The largest subcamp of Flossenbürg, it was established as part of an effort to disperse and increase war production. Prisoners were forced to work in the caverns Richard I and II, producing Maybach HL230 tank engines for Auto Union (now Audi) and preparing the second site for intended production of tungsten and molybdenum wire and sheet metal by Osram. In the last weeks of the war, the camp became a hub for death marches, until its dissolution by the German surrender.
Lengenfeld		Lengenfeld, Bavaria 50°34′33″N 12°21′01″E				
Lobositz		Lobositz, Reichsgau Sudetenland (now Lovosice, Czech Republic) 50°30′50″N 14°02′53″E				
Mehltheuer		Mehltheuer, Bavaria 50°32′35″N 12°02′09″E				
Meissen-Neuhirschstein		Neuhirschstein Castle, Hirschstein, Saxony 51°15′6.5″N 13°24′1.1″E				
Mittweida		Mittweida, Saxony 50°59′04″N 12°57′55″E				
Mockethal-Zatzschke		Mockethal, Saxony 50°58′58″N 13°57′09″E				
Mülsen St. Micheln		Mülsen St. Micheln, Saxony 50°45′04″N 12°34′10″E				
Neurohlau		Neurohlau, Reichsgau Sudetenland (now Nová Role, Czech Republic) 50°16′37″N 12°46′36″E				
Nossen		Nossen, Saxony 51°03′45″N 13°16′39″E				
Nuremberg (SS-Barracks)		Nuremberg, Bavaria 49°25′49″N 11°05′52″E				
Nuremberg (Siemens-Schuckertwerke)		Nuremberg, Bavaria 49°24′32″N 11°05′05″E				
Obertraubling		Obertraubling, Bavaria 48°58′54″N 12°11′36″E				See also Regensburg subcamp.
Oederan		Oederan, Saxony 50°51′31″N 13°10′43″E				
Plattling		Plattling, Bavaria 48°46′35″N 12°52′22″E				
Plauen (cotton mill)		Plauen, Saxony 50°30′53″N 12°07′38″E				
Plauen (Dr. Th. Horn)		Plauen, Saxony 50°31′31″N 12°06′45″E				
Plauen Industriewerke		Plauen, Saxony 50°29′36″N 12°06′18″E				
Porschdorf		Porschdorf, Saxony 50°56′33″N 14°08′18″E				
Pottenstein		Pottenstein, Bavaria 49°45′41″N 11°24′52″E				
Rabstein		Böhmisch Kamnitz, Reichsgau Sudetenland (now Česká Kamenice, Czech Republic) 50°48′2.8″N 14°23′10″E				Rabstein underground factory
Regensburg		Regensburg, Bavaria 49°1′28.9″N 12°5′50.3″E				aka Außenkommando Colosseum ("Colosseum subcamp").
Reuth		Reuth bei Erbendorf, Bavaria 49°50′34″N 12°07′28″E		7		All Jehovah's Witnesses from Germany and the Netherlands.
Rochlitz		Rochlitz, Saxony 51°03′03″N 12°47′41″E				
Saal an der Donau		Saal an der Donau, Bavaria 48°53′52″N 11°58′04″E				
Schlackenwerth		Schlackenwerth, Reichsgau Sudetenland (now Ostrov, Czech Republic) 50°18′30″N 12°56′52″E				
Schönheide		Schönheide, Saxony 50°30′11″N 12°31′24″E			3	
Seifhennersdorf		Seifhennersdorf, Saxony 50°56′20″N 14°36′27″E				
Siegmar-Schönau		Wanderer Works, Siegmar-Schönau, Saxony 50°48′59″N 12°50′48″E				
St. Georgenthal		St. Georgenthal, Reichsgau Sudetenland (now Jiřetín pod Jedlovou, Czech Republic) 50°52′35″N 14°34′25″E				
Steinschönau		Steinschönau, Reichsgau Sudetenland (now Kamenický Šenov, Czech Republic) 50°46′27″N 14°28′24″E				
Stulln		Stulln, Bavaria 49°25′30″N 12°09′14″E				
Venusberg		Venusberg, Saxony 50°41′58″N 13°00′50″E				
Wilischthal		Wilischthal, Saxony 50°43′29″N 13°03′23″E				
Wolkenburg		Wolkenburg, Saxony 50°54′00″N 12°40′11″E				
Würzburg		Würzburg, Bavaria 49°47′09″N 9°57′15″E				
Zschachwitz		Zschachwitz, Dresden, Saxony 50°59′27″N 13°50′40″E				
Zschopau		DKW-Werke, Zschopau, Saxony 50°44′16″N 13°03′56″E				
Zwickau		Zwickau, Saxony 50°43′58″N 12°28′29″E				
Zwodau		Zwodau, Reichsgau Sudetenland (now Svatava, Czech Republic) 50°11′43″N 12°37′12″E				
