= Přindiš =

Přindiš is a Czech surname. Notable people with the surname include:

- Oskar Přindiš (1947–2012) Czech painter
- Pavel Přindiš (born 1961) Czech slalom canoeist
- Petr Přindiš (born 1989) Czech ice hockey player
- Vít Přindiš (born 1989) Czech slalom canoeist
