= Nová Role =

- Town
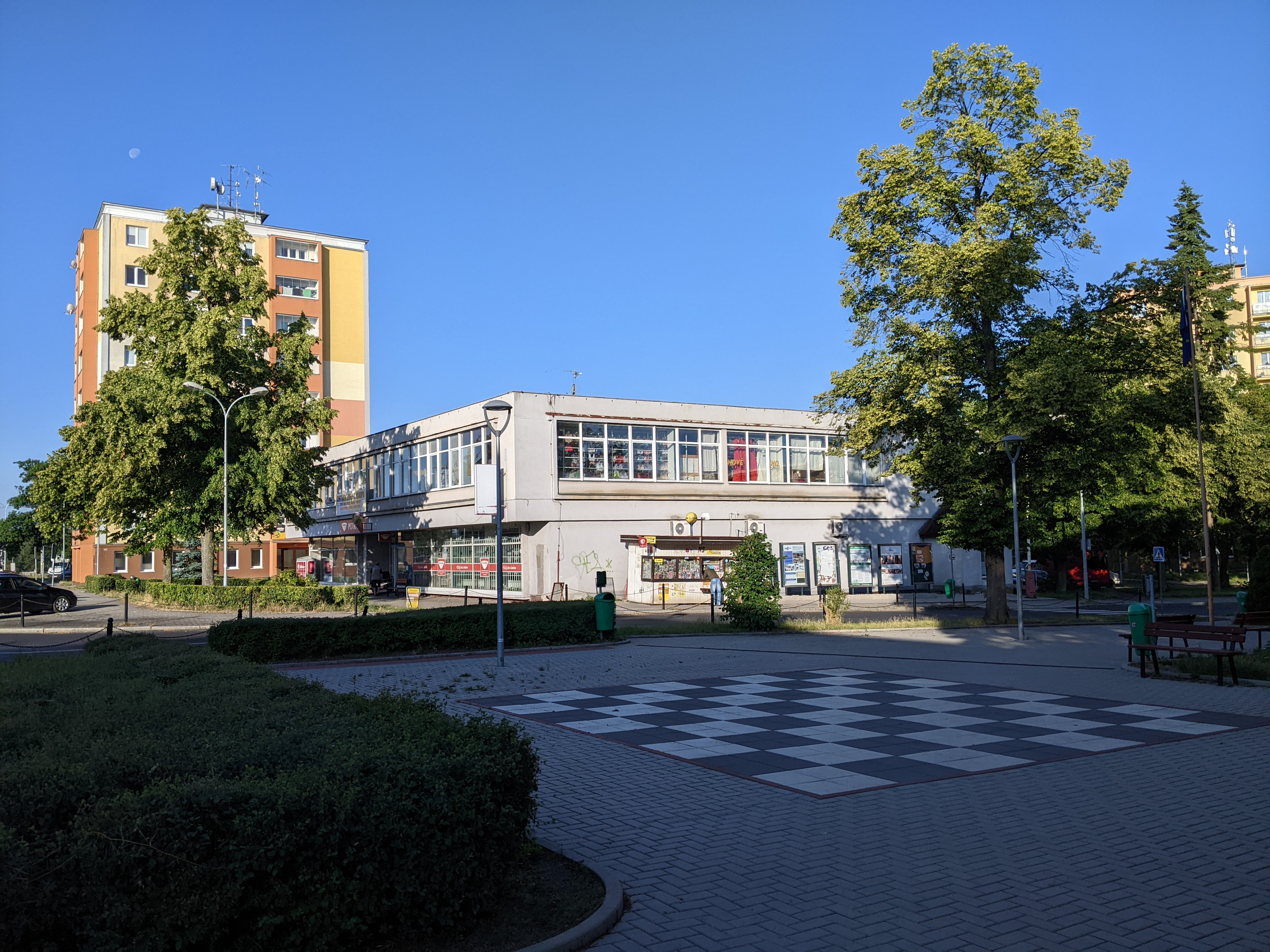
- Centre of Nová Role

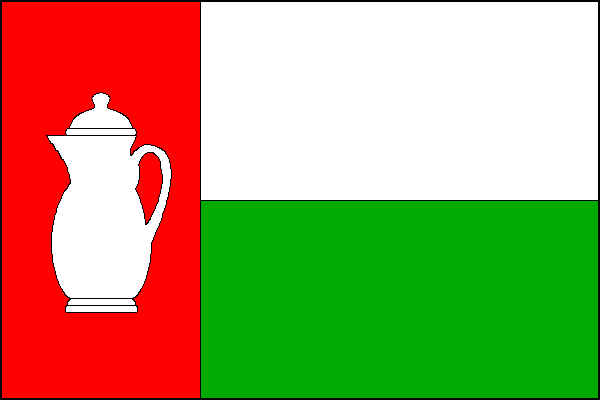
- Flag Coat of arms

- Location in the Czech Republic
- Coordinates: 50°16′16″N 12°47′3″E
- Country: Czech Republic
- Region: Karlovy Vary
- District: Karlovy Vary
- First mentioned: 1293

Government
  - Mayor: Luboš Pastor

Area
  - Total: 13.53 km^{2} (5.22 sq mi)
- Elevation: 418 m (1,371 ft)

Population (2026-01-01)
  - Total: 4,298
  - Density: 317.7/km^{2} (822.7/sq mi)
- Time zone: UTC+1 (CET)
  - Summer (DST): UTC+2 (CEST)
- Postal code: 362 25
- Website: www.novarole.cz

Nová Role (Czech pronunciation: [ˈnovaː ˈrolɛ]; German: Neurohlau) is a town in Karlovy Vary District in the Karlovy Vary Region of the Czech Republic. It has about 4,300 inhabitants. The town proper is located on the Rolava River in the Sokolov Basin.

== Administrative division ==
Nová Role consists of three municipal parts (in brackets population according to the 2021 census):

- Nová Role (3,247)
- Jimlíkov (137)
- Mezirolí (662)

== Etymology ==
The name Role is derived from the Rolava River. The settlement was also alternatively called Nová Rolava. The prefix nová ('new') serves to distinguish it from nearby Stará Role ('old Role', today a part of Karlovy Vary).

== Geography ==
Nová Role is located about 6 kilometres (4 mi) northwest of Karlovy Vary. The town proper lies in the Sokolov Basin, but the municipal territory also extends to the north into the Ore Mountains. The highest point is the Borový hill at 512 m (1,680 ft) above sea level. The Rolava River flows through the town.

On the western edge of the town is the fishpond Novorolský rybník, supplied by the stream Vlčí potok. It has an area of 20 ha (49 acres) and is used for recreational purposes and fish farming.

== History ==
The first written mention of Nová Role is from 1293, when it was a royal property. It was a Slavic village, whose foundation is associated with deposits of tin, silver and iron ore on the upper course of the Rolava River. Until 1411, Nová Role belonged to the Loket estate, and then it became part of the Sokolov estate. In 1554, Nová Role was acquired by the Schlick family. From 1622 until the establishment of an independent municipality in 1848, it was property of the Nostitz family.

During World War II, Nazi German Neurohlau concentration camp was located here.

== Demographics ==
Historical population

Year	Pop.	±%
1869	779	—
1880	927	+19.0%
1890	1,068	+15.2%
1900	1,388	+30.0%
1910	1,583	+14.0%

Year	Pop.	±%
1921	1,458	−7.9%
1930	1,859	+27.5%
1950	1,156	−37.8%
1961	2,569	+122.2%
1970	4,578	+78.2%

Year	Pop.	±%
1980	4,467	−2.4%
1991	3,888	−13.0%
2001	4,048	+4.1%
2011	3,920	−3.2%
2021	4,046	+3.2%

Source: Censuses

== Transport ==
Nová Role is located on the railway line Karlovy Vary–Nejdek, further continuing to Potůčky or Nové Hamry. It is also connected with Loket.

== Sights ==
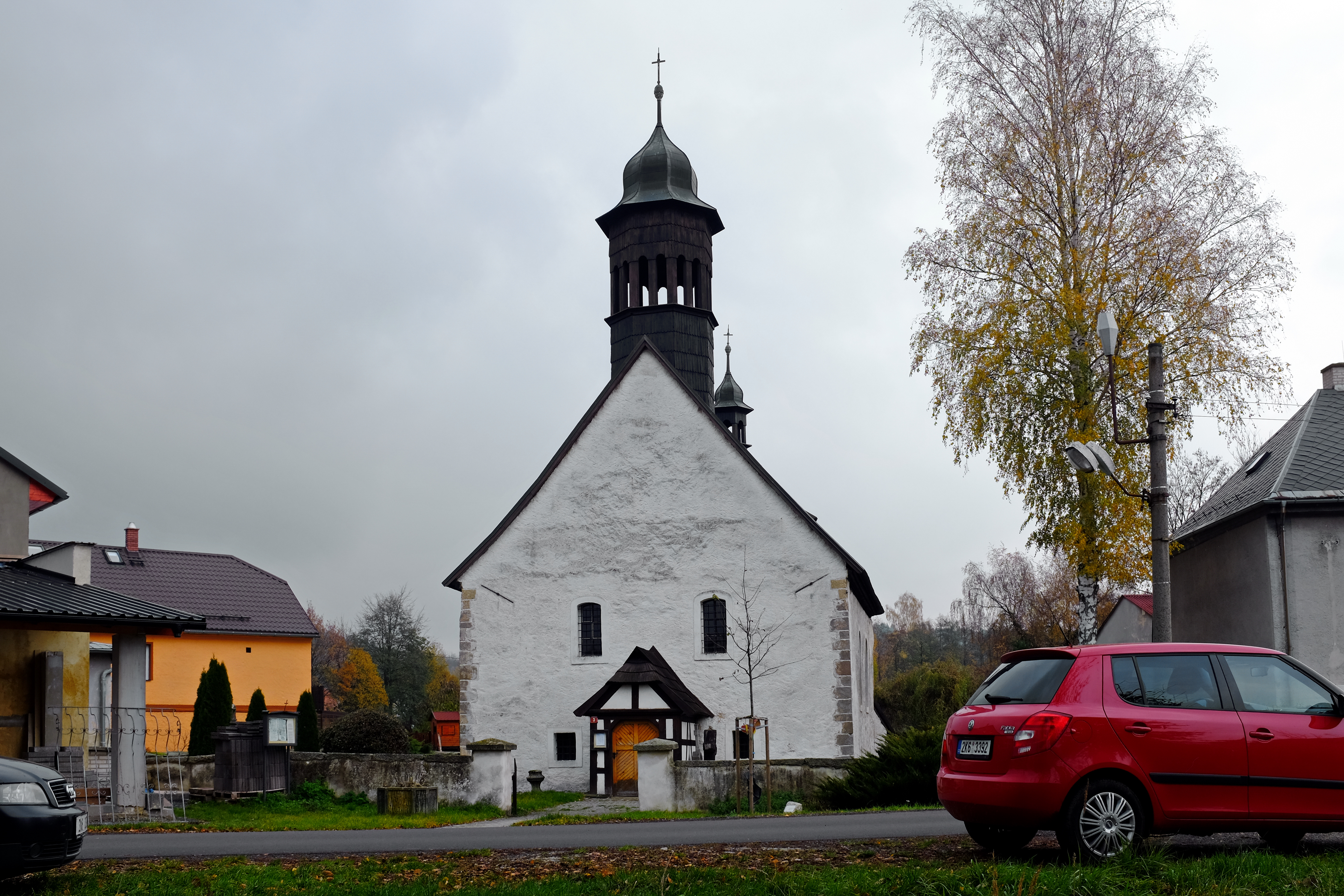
Church of Saint Michael

The main landmark of Nová Role is the Church of Saint Michael. It was originally built in the Romanesque-Gothic style in 1240–1255. In 1781, it was rebuilt in the Baroque style. It is one of the oldest buildings in the region, demonstrating the penetration of Burgundian influences into the early Gothic architecture of Bohemia.

== Twin towns – sister cities ==
Nová Role is twinned with:

- Breitenbrunn, Germany
