= Willi Huttig =

German photographer (1909–2001)

Willi (Willie) Huttig (28 March 1909 – 27 December 2001) was a German photographer and alpinist.

== Early life ==
Willi (referred to as 'Willie' in English references) Huttig was born on 28 March 1909 in Chodov in Bohemia (today in the Czech Republic) into a significant regional photographic family. His grandfather, Wenzl Fritsch (1842–1916), founded the first photographic studio in the region in 1884 and by the beginning of the 20th century owned and operated photographic studios, in addition to the original in Chodov, in Karlovy Vary, Drahovice, Stará Role, Loket and Jáchymov. After the death of Wenzl Fritsch during the First World War, his son, Willi Fritsch took on management of the company and maintained the head office in Chodov, where he built a house with a studio in what today is Tyršova Street.

== Professional photographer ==
After 1932, the young Willi Huttig, who had worked for his grandfather and uncle, took over the management of the established company. He became a respected portraitist and also conducted business in picture postcards in partnership with Richard Wörsching who in 1932 won a contract to photograph landscapes of Starnberg and environment for advertising purposes and the sole right to photograph and film on the lake promenade and in the popular urban bathing beach of Starnberg.

By the mid-30s, in addition to his wife and assistant, Vera (and later, his son Thomas), Huttig had employed fourteen co-workers, giving him some leisure to pursue his lifelong passion as an alpinist. His pictures taken while mountain climbing garnered awards at more than twenty international exhibitions during the 1930s; in Budapest, Barcelona, Amsterdam, New York and Chicago among others.

Huttig’s successful career was interrupted by the World War II, in which he participated as a photographer at the front. After returning post-war to Chodov, which had been annexed by Nazi Germany as part of the Sudetenland, and from which all Germans were being expelled, he found his shop confiscated. He managed to secure work with an American military crew and left with them for Germany at the end of 1945. With him he took only two cameras and a few of his pre-war images and negatives, leaving everything else in his house in Tyršova Street. In Germany he worked as a photographer for the US Army magazine Stars and Stripes. In 1947 he settled at Hauptstraße 25, Starnberg on the Starnberger See (lake) in Upper Bavaria 25 km from Munich, at the foothills of the Alps, and there opened a photographic studio.

== Recognition ==
In 1955 Huttig’s photograph of a priest officiating at a funeral in the snow, surrounded by mourners under umbrellas, was featured in MoMA’s world-touring The Family of Man exhibition, curated by Edward Steichen, which was seen by nine million visitors.

In 1959 he photographed Pvt Elvis Presley during his stint with the US Army's Armored Division in Germany. Elvis used a three-day pass to visit Munich and Huttig was contracted to make publicity shots of him with 18-year-old German actress Vera Tschechowa, which were important for keeping alive Elvis' reputation with his fans during his army service years.

During his life, Huttig won awards at forty-eight international exhibitions around the world. His work is held in the collection of the Museum Folkwang, Museumsplatz 1, 45128 Essen.

== Recent exhibitions ==
- Willi Huttig: Hiking photographer August 12 – September 25, 2017, Galerie U Vavřince, Staroměstská 39, Chodov.
- Willi Huttig - Fotografie August 13, 2018 at Stadtbibliothek in der Roten Schule in Oelsnitz/E.

== Mountaineer ==
Willi Huttig was a keen mountaineer. For the Starnberg section of the Alpine trail in 1968, as its first chairman, he acquired a high-alpine hut, the Hohenzollernhaus at 2123 m. After negotiations with the main committee of the Deutsche Alpenverein (DAV) and its Berlin section, the Starnberg section was able to purchase the Hohenzollernhaus in 1978, and after renovations made it the first DAV hut and a vital asset in mountain rescues.
