= Luftwaffe guards at concentration camps =

Luftwaffe staffing of Nazi concentration camps

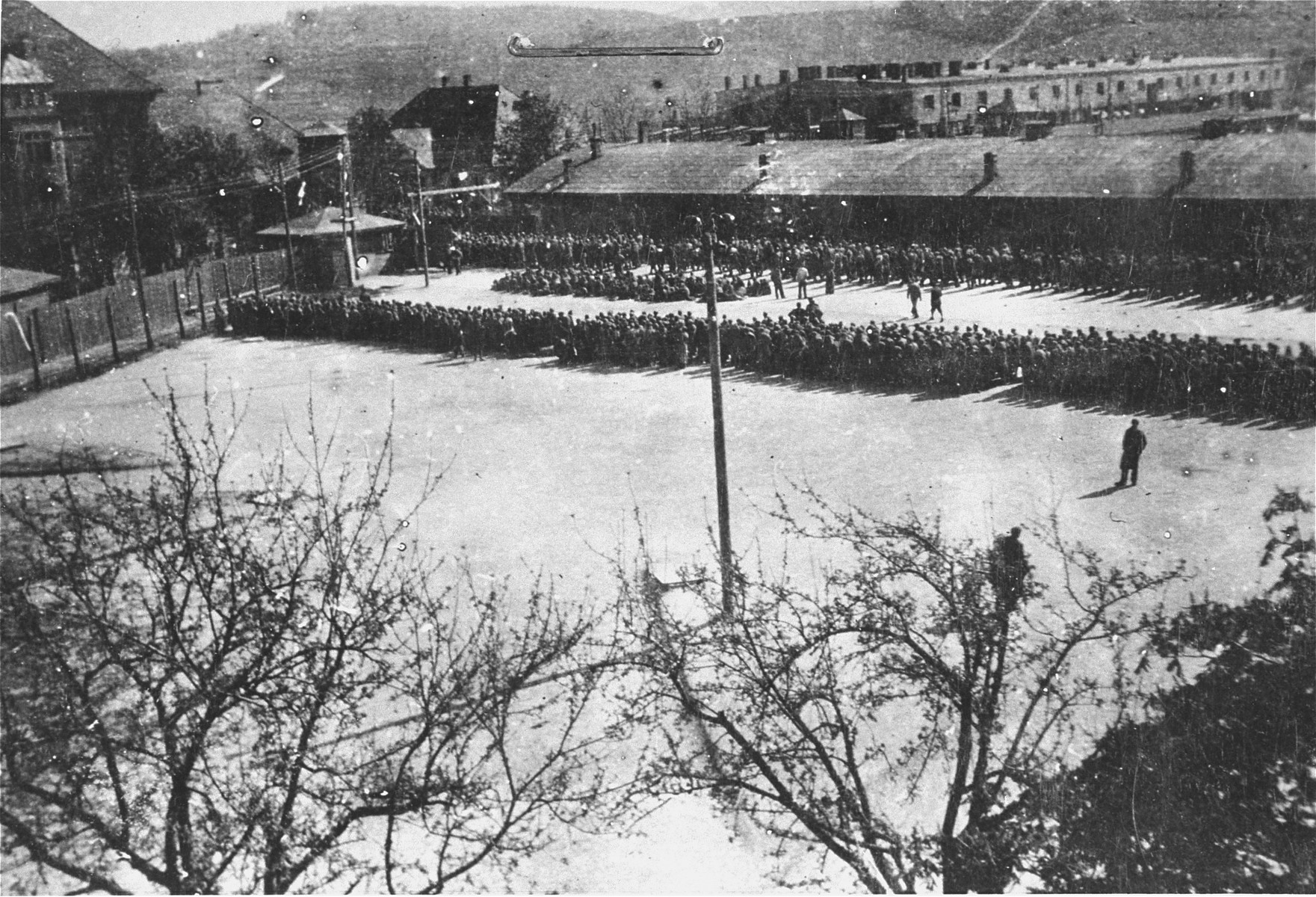
New arrivals are counted at Melk; the vast majority of guards at this Mauthausen-Gusen subcamp were Luftwaffe soldiers.

by the branch of the Wehrmacht that used the products. The Wehrmacht also posted about 10,000 soldiers to concentration camps because of a shortage of guards in mid-1944, including many from the Luftwaffe.

== Camp operations ==
By the end of the war, 2,700 Luftwaffe soldiers worked as guards at Buchenwald and its subcamps. The main camps of Flossenbürg Mittelbau-Dora, and Natzweiler had many Luftwaffe guards.

In late 1943, a Luftwaffe salvage yard (German: Zerlegebetrieb) opened halfway between Auschwitz II-Birkenau and Auschwitz I. About 1,300 prisoners at a time were forced to work salvaging parts from Luftwaffe and Allied aircraft that had been damaged beyond repair. These prisoners were supervised by Luftwaffe personnel and guarded by the SS. Although many of the Luftwaffe personnel smuggled letters or provided food for the prisoners, their commanding officer, a Luftwaffe major, was known for beating prisoners with an aluminium pipe. The prisoners were housed at Birkenau and forced to march to the Zerlegebetrieb each morning; they were exempt from work if the temperature dropped below −15 °C (5 °F). Most were Polish or Soviet POWs; the latter were known for their frequent escape attempts. Because of the valuable items that could be found while dismantling the aircraft, prisoners frequently tried to smuggle them back to Birkenau to trade for necessities. The death rate was high because of the harsh working conditions and workplace accidents. A factory for anti-aircraft weapons at Monowitz was staffed by Luftwaffe guards. The Luftwaffe also provided flak units to protect Monowitz factories from air attack. By early 1944, there were 1,000 Luftwaffe guards at Auschwitz.

Luftwaffe guards had a reputation for being slightly less brutal than the SS, in several cases attempting to improve the conditions for prisoners. Nevertheless, Luftwaffe personnel also frequently mistreated prisoners. For example, Luftwaffe technicians in several places forced prisoners to defuse or otherwise handle unexploded bombs. Luftwaffe soldiers reportedly executed prisoners during a death march, and tortured and murdered prisoners at Wiener Neudorf, a subcamp of Mauthausen concentration camp. For the latter crimes, Ludwig Stier, the Luftwaffe captain in charge of the Luftwaffe soldiers at the camp, was sentenced to death by a U.S. military court in 1947. He died on death row on 5 September 1947.

== List of camps with primarily Luftwaffe guards ==
- Buchenwald subcamps: Mühlhausen and

Stalag-13 Wernigerode

- Dachau subcamps: Horgau, Fischen, Ottobrunn, Stephanskirchen, and Sudelfeld
- Flossenbürg subcamps: Altenhammer, Holleischen, Kirchham, Leitmeritz, and Mülsen St. Micheln
- Gross-Rosen subcamps: Brieg and Kittlitztreben
- Herzogenbusch subcamps: Breda, Leeuwarden, and Venlo
- Hinzert subcamps: Langendiebach I and II, Mainz-Finthen, Merzhausen, Seligenstadt, and Usingen
- Mauthausen-Gusen subcamps: Gusen II, Melk, Wiener Neudorf, and Schwechat
- Mielec concentration camp
- Mittelbau-Dora subcamps: Ellrich, Günzerode
- Natzweiler subcamps: Cochem-Bruttig, Erzingen, Hailfingen airfield, where almost 200 prisoners died, Neckarelz I and II, and Mannheim-Waldhof
- Neuengamme subcamps: Beendorf, Bremen, Bremen-Obernheide, Kaltenkirchen, and Meppen-Dalum
- A forced labor camp near the Nowy Swierzen ghetto
- Ravensbrück subcamps: Karlshagen I and II
- SS-Baubrigaden: 13 camps involved in the construction of V-1 weapons sites in occupied France
- Sachsenhausen subcamps: Mackenrode, Nüxi, and Wieda
- Stutthof subcamps: Gerdauen, Heiligenbeil, Jesau, Praust, Schippenbeil, and Seerappen
