= Rolava =

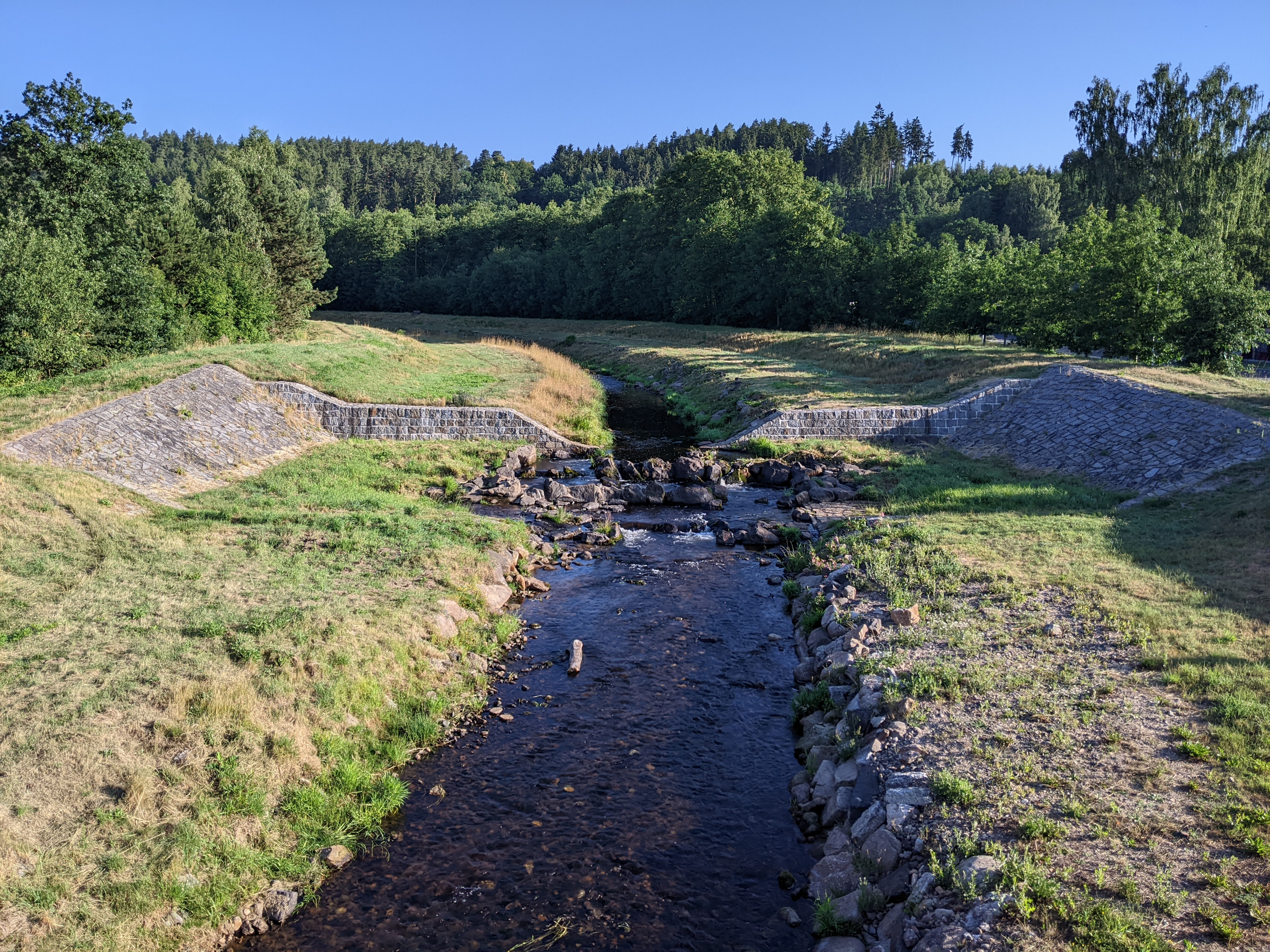
- The Rolava in Nová Role

Location
- Country: Czech Republic
- Region: Karlovy Vary

Physical characteristics
- Source
  - location: Přebuz, Ore Mountains
  - coordinates: 50°24′20″N 12°36′43″E
  - elevation: 921 m (3,022 ft)
- Mouth
  - location: Ohře
  - coordinates: 50°13′56″N 12°50′44″E
  - elevation: 370 m (1,210 ft)
- Length: 36.6 km (22.7 mi)
- Basin size: 138.0 km^{2} (53.3 sq mi)
- Discharge
  - average: 2.50 m^{3}/s (88 cu ft/s) near estuary

Basin features
- Progression: Ohře→ Elbe→ North Sea

The Rolava (German: Rohlau) is a river in the Czech Republic, a left tributary of the Ohře River. It flows through the Karlovy Vary Region. It is 36.6 km (22.7 mi) long.

== Etymology ==
The name is derived from the Old Czech word role ('field'), meaning "the water flowing between fields".

== Characteristic ==
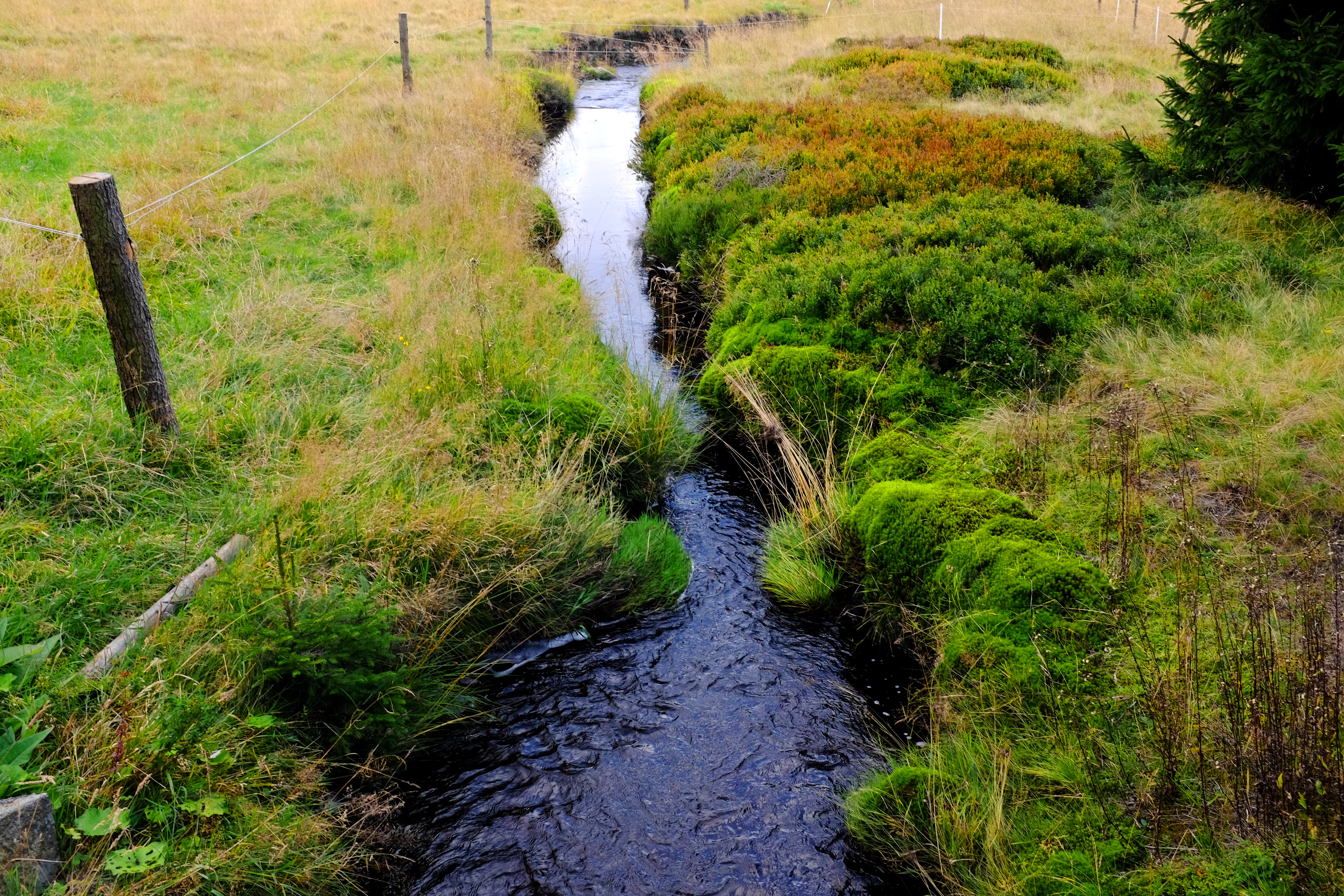
Upper course of the Rolava

The Rolava originates in the territory of Přebuz in the Ore Mountains at an elevation of 921 m (3,022 ft) and flows to Karlovy Vary, where it enters the Ohře River at an elevation of 370 m (1,210 ft). It is 36.6 km (22.7 mi) long. Its drainage basin has an area of 138.0 km^{2} (53.3 sq mi).

The longest tributaries of the Rolava are:

Tributary	Length (km)	River km	Side
Černá voda	9.6	25.2	left
Limnice	6.2	15.5	left
Nejdecký potok	5.7	16.2	right

== Course ==
The most notable settlement on the river is the city of Karlovy Vary. The river flows through the municipal territories of Přebuz, Vysoká Pec, Nové Hamry, Nejdek, Smolné Pece, Nová Role and Karlovy Vary.

== Bodies of water ==
There are 154 bodies of water in the basin area. The largest of them is the Lesík Reservoir with an area of 9.3 ha (23 acres), built on the Nejdecký potok. North of the Rolava's source is the raised bog of Velké jeřábí jezero, whose waters the Rolava partly collects.

== See also ==
- List of rivers of the Czech Republic
