= Petr Přindiš =

Czech ice hockey player

- Born: May 2, 1989 (age 37) Habartov, Czechoslovakia
- Height: 5 ft 11 in (180 cm)
- Weight: 168 lb (76 kg; 12 st 0 lb)
- Position: Defence
- Shoots: Left
- Chance Liga team Former teams: HC Banik Sokolov; HC Karlovy Vary
- Playing career: 2010–present

Petr Přindiš (born May 2, 1989) is a Czech professional ice hockey defenceman for HC Baník Sokolov of the Chance Liga.

Přindiš previously played 31 games with HC Karlovy Vary of the Czech Extraliga.
