= Chodov (Sokolov District) =

- Town
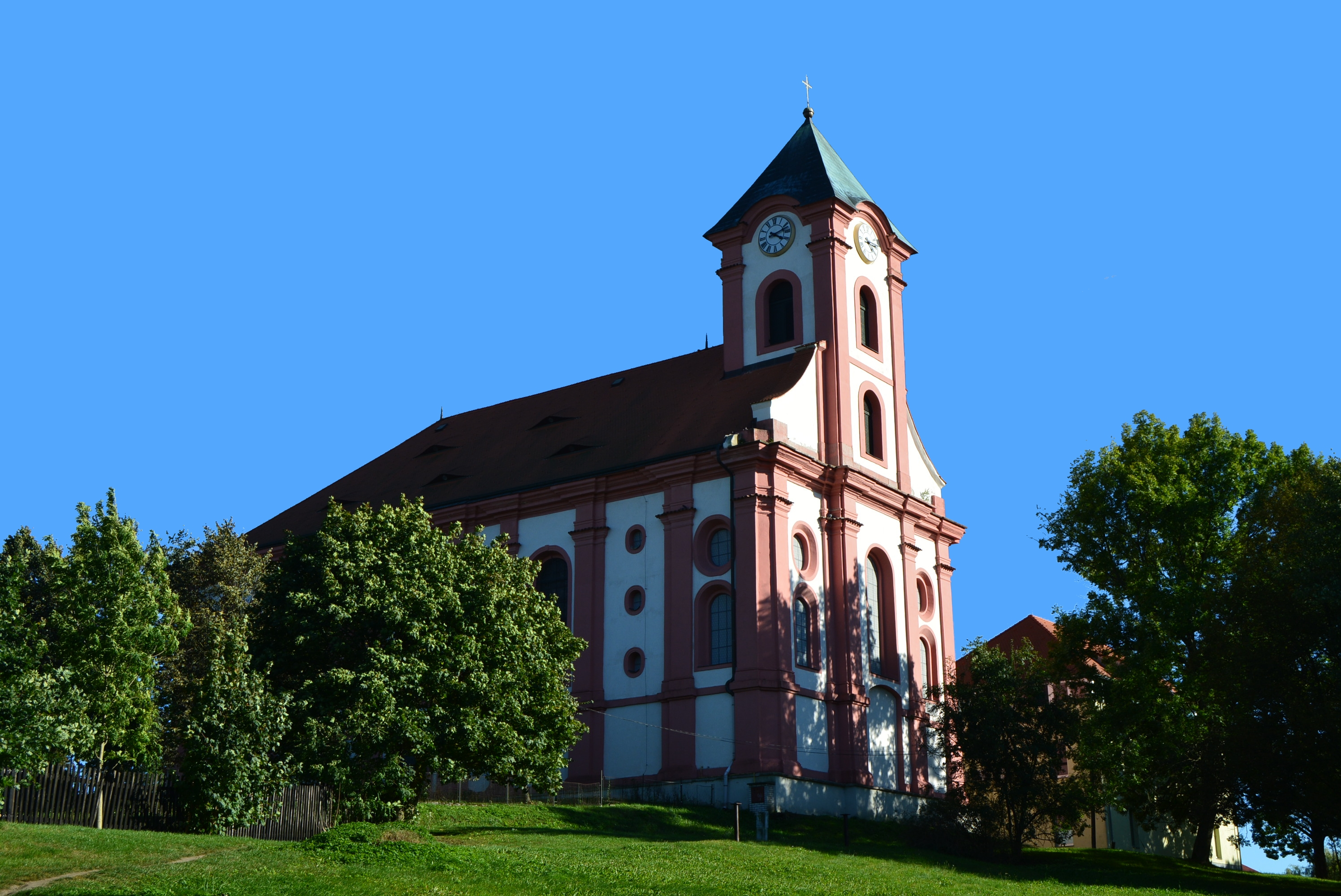
- Church of Saint Lawrence

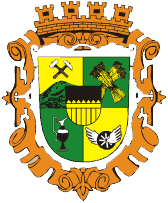
- Flag Coat of arms

- Location in the Czech Republic
- Coordinates: 50°14′29″N 12°44′38″E
- Country: Czech Republic
- Region: Karlovy Vary
- District: Sokolov
- First mentioned: 1195

Government
  - Mayor: Patrik Pizinger

Area
  - Total: 14.26 km^{2} (5.51 sq mi)
- Elevation: 418 m (1,371 ft)

Population (2026-01-01)
  - Total: 12,451
  - Density: 873.1/km^{2} (2,261/sq mi)
- Time zone: UTC+1 (CET)
  - Summer (DST): UTC+2 (CEST)
- Postal code: 357 35
- Website: www.mestochodov.cz

Chodov (Czech pronunciation: [ˈxodof]; German: Chodau) is a town in Sokolov District in the Karlovy Vary Region of the Czech Republic. It has about 12,000 inhabitants. The town is located on the stream Chodovský potok in the Sokolov Basin.

Chodov was founded in the 12th century, but it became a town only in 1894. The main landmark of Chodov is the Church of Saint Lawrence from the 18th century.

== Administrative division ==
Chodov consists of two municipal parts (in brackets population according to the 2021 census):

- Chodov (12,154)
- Stará Chodovská (297)

== Etymology ==
The name is derived from the personal Slavic name Chod, meaning "the village of Chod's people".

== Geography ==
Chodov is located about 9 kilometres (6 mi) northeast of Sokolov and 7 km (4 mi) west of Karlovy Vary. It lies mostly in the Sokolov Basin, only the northernmost part of the municipal territory extends into the Ore Mountains and includes the highest point of Chodov at 521 m (1,709 ft) above sea level. The stream Chodovský potok flows through the town. There are several bodies of water in the municipal territory, most notably the artificial lake Bílá voda, used for recreational purposes.

== History ==
Chodov was originally a Slavic settlement. The Slavic colonisation was not successful and in the Middle Ages this part of Bohemia was colonised by Germans. In the 12th and 13th centuries, Chodov belonged to the Waldsassen Abbey and in the 14th–17th centuries it belonged to the Loket estate. In 1894, Chodov was promoted to a town and got the right to use its own coat of arms.

From 1938 to 1945 it was annexed by Nazi Germany and administered as part of Reichsgau Sudetenland. Until the end of World War II the town was inhabited mostly by Germans. After the war, the German population was expelled and the town was resettled by Czechs. In the 1960s a big chemical factory was built in nearby Vřesová and then new housing estates were built for Czech and Slovak workers who moved here.

== Demographics ==
Historical population

Year	Pop.	±%
1869	2,472	—
1880	3,389	+37.1%
1890	5,204	+53.6%
1900	7,104	+36.5%
1910	7,470	+5.2%

Year	Pop.	±%
1921	7,035	−5.8%
1930	7,849	+11.6%
1950	3,786	−51.8%
1961	4,551	+20.2%
1970	11,798	+159.2%

Year	Pop.	±%
1980	14,704	+24.6%
1991	14,929	+1.5%
2001	14,687	−1.6%
2011	13,748	−6.4%
2021	12,451	−9.4%

Source: Censuses

== Economy ==
The largest employer based in the town is SKF Lubrication Systems CZ, a manufacturer of lubrication systems. It employs more than 250 people.

== Transport ==
Chodov lies on interregional railway lines Prague–Cheb and Plzeň–Karlovy Vary. In addition, it is connected to Loket by a short local line.

== Sights ==
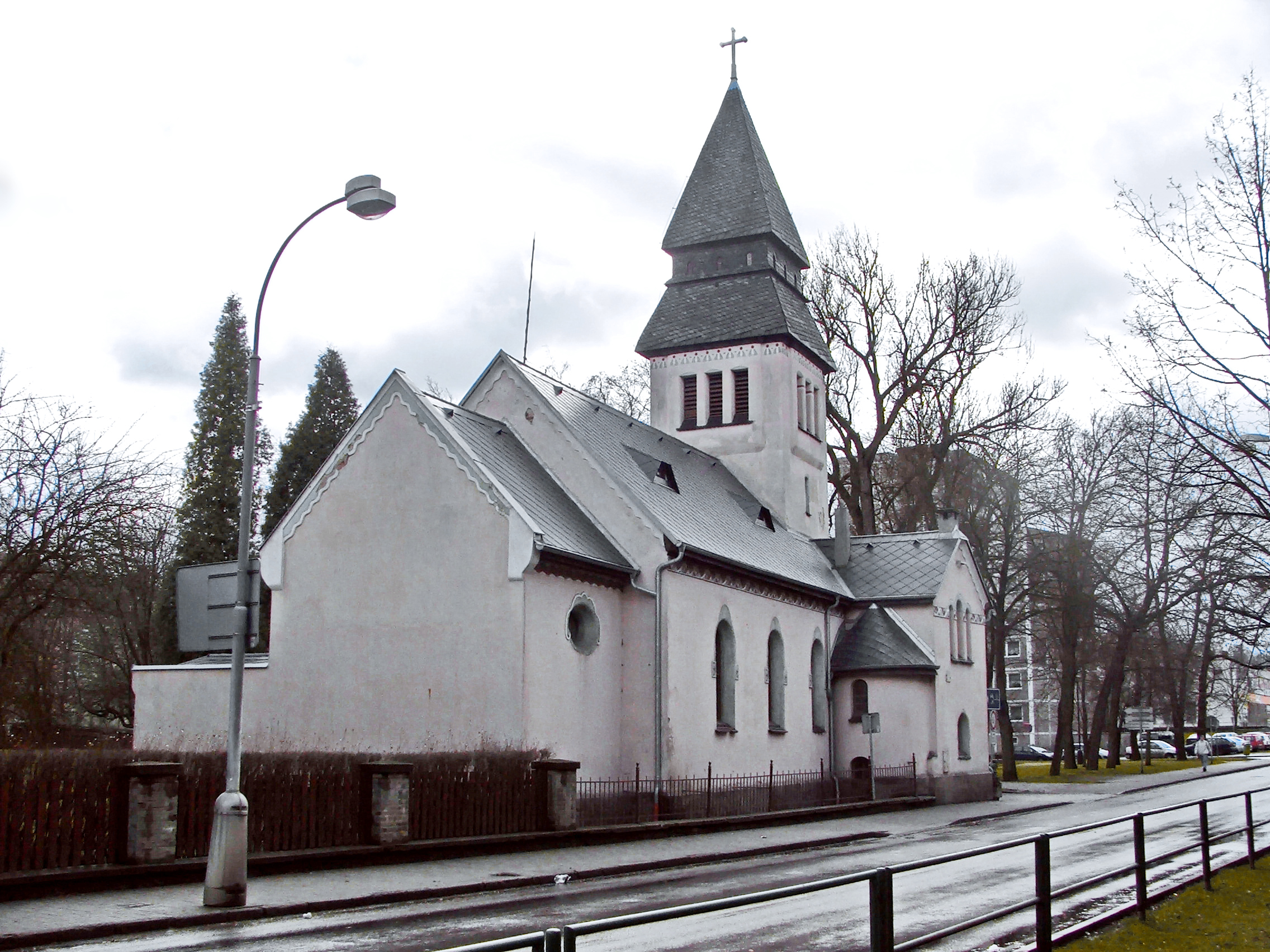
Evangelical church

The most significant building is the Church of Saint Lawrence, built by the constructor Johann Wolfgang Braunbock. It was built in the Baroque style in 1725–1733. In the interior are the Stations of the Cross, which consists of fourteen large canvases. It is the work of regional artists from the 18th and 19th centuries, which is rare in its dimensions and its age.

In front of the church stands an early Baroque statue of Saint Sebastian from 1673. Another early Baroque statue is the Virgin Mary on the Marian column from 1675, located on the town square.

The other church in the town belongs to the Evangelical Church of Czech Brethren.

== Notable people ==
- Willi Huttig (1909–2001), German photographer and alpinist
- Jana Nečasová (born 1964), politician and civil servant
- Radek Duda (born 1979), ice hockey player

== Twin towns – sister cities ==
Chodov is twinned with:

- Oelsnitz, Germany
- Waldsassen, Germany
