= Habartov =

- Town
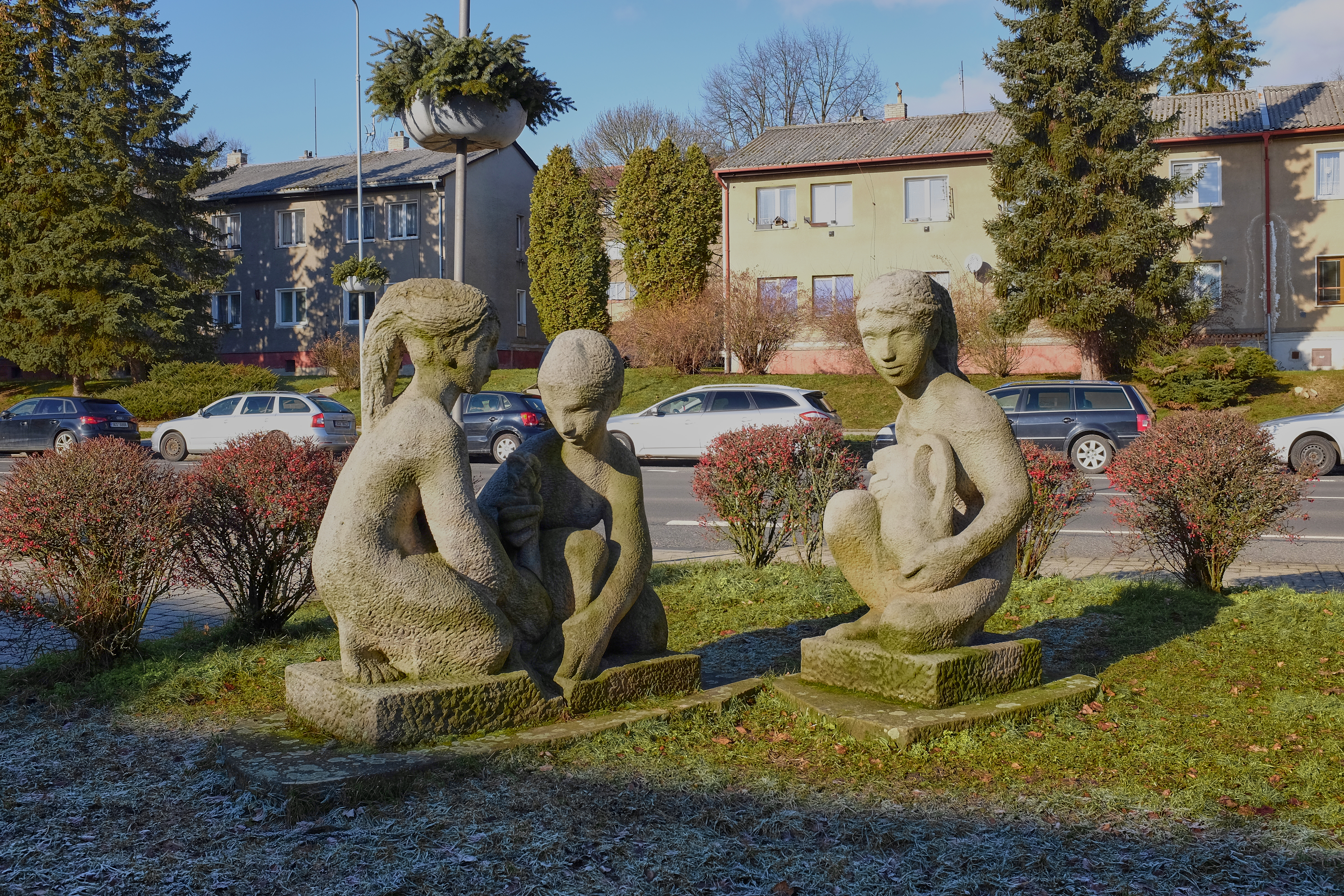
- Statues on the town square

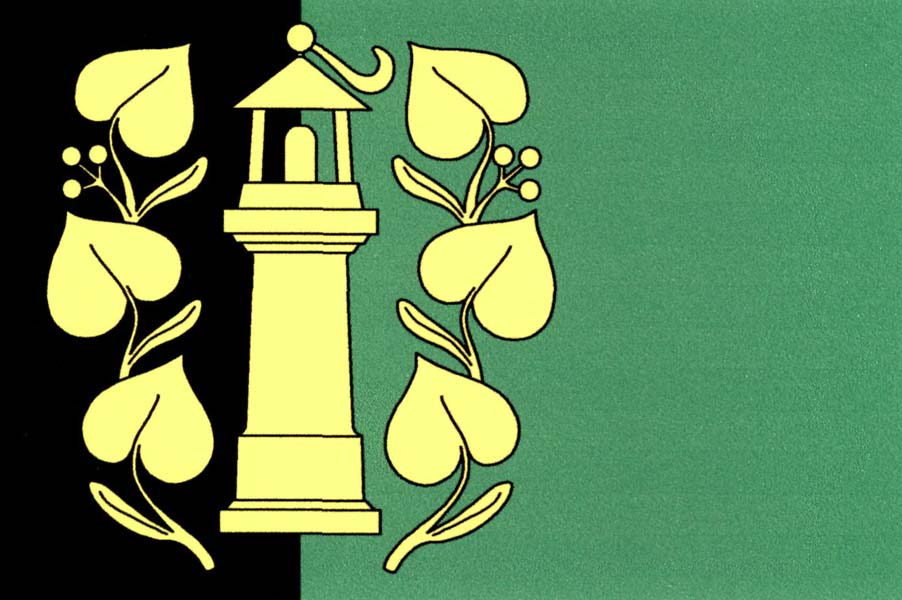
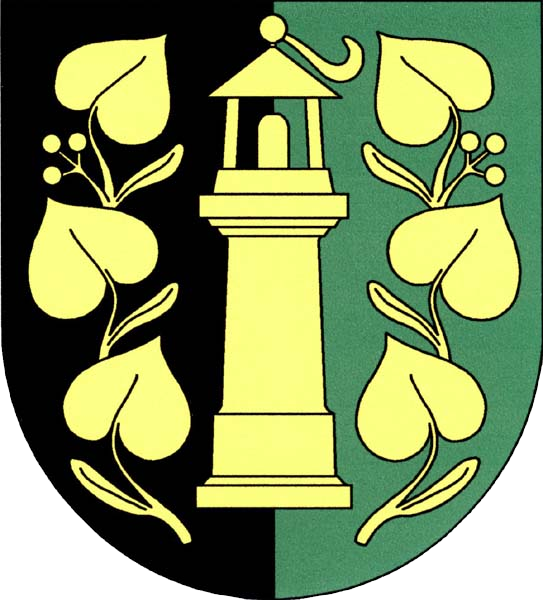
- Flag Coat of arms

- Location in the Czech Republic
- Coordinates: 50°10′59″N 12°33′07″E
- Country: Czech Republic
- Region: Karlovy Vary
- District: Sokolov
- First mentioned: 1339

Government
  - Mayor: Petr Janura

Area
  - Total: 21.39 km^{2} (8.26 sq mi)
- Elevation: 484 m (1,588 ft)

Population (2026-01-01)
  - Total: 4,614
  - Density: 215.7/km^{2} (558.7/sq mi)
- Time zone: UTC+1 (CET)
  - Summer (DST): UTC+2 (CEST)
- Postal code: 357 09
- Website: www.mestohabartov.cz

Habartov (Czech pronunciation: [ˈɦabartof]; until 1947 Habersbirk; German: Habersbirk) is a town in Sokolov District in the Karlovy Vary Region of the Czech Republic. It has about 4,600 inhabitants.

== Administrative division ==
Habartov consists of five municipal parts (in brackets population according to the 2021 census):

- Habartov (3,613)
- Horní Částkov (115)
- Kluč (603)
- Lítov (87)
- Úžlabí (65)

== Etymology ==
The initial German name of Habartov was Habersbirk. The second part of the name -birk means 'birch' in German. The first part Habers- was probably originally spelled Hawarts- and was derived from the personal name Hawart. Hawart was a popular given name in the family of knights who once owned this area. In 1947, the town was renamed from Habersbirk to its current name.

== Geography ==
Habartov is situated about 7 kilometres (4 mi) west of Sokolov and 22 km (14 mi) west of Karlovy Vary. The northern part of the municipal territory with the town proper lies in the southwestern tip of the Ore Mountains and the southern part of Habartov extends into the Sokolov Basin. The highest point is the hill Částkovský vrch at 598 metres (1,962 ft) above sea level. Half of Medard Lake is situated in the territory of Habartov.

== History ==
The first written mention of Habartov is from 1339. The most notable owners of the town were the Nostitz family, who held it from 1668 to 1719. Habartov grew thanks to coal mining and mineral processing near the village, and gradually became a town in the 19th century.

After 1945, a large part of Habartov was demolished due to coal mining.

== Demographics ==
Historical population

Year	Pop.	±%
1869	1,970	—
1880	2,419	+22.8%
1890	2,435	+0.7%
1900	3,202	+31.5%
1910	4,390	+37.1%

Year	Pop.	±%
1921	4,299	−2.1%
1930	4,872	+13.3%
1950	3,079	−36.8%
1961	4,182	+35.8%
1970	6,701	+60.2%

Year	Pop.	±%
1980	6,184	−7.7%
1991	5,477	−11.4%
2001	5,390	−1.6%
2011	4,822	−10.5%
2021	4,483	−7.0%

Source: Censuses

== Transport ==
There are no railways or major roads passing through the municipal territory.

== Sights ==
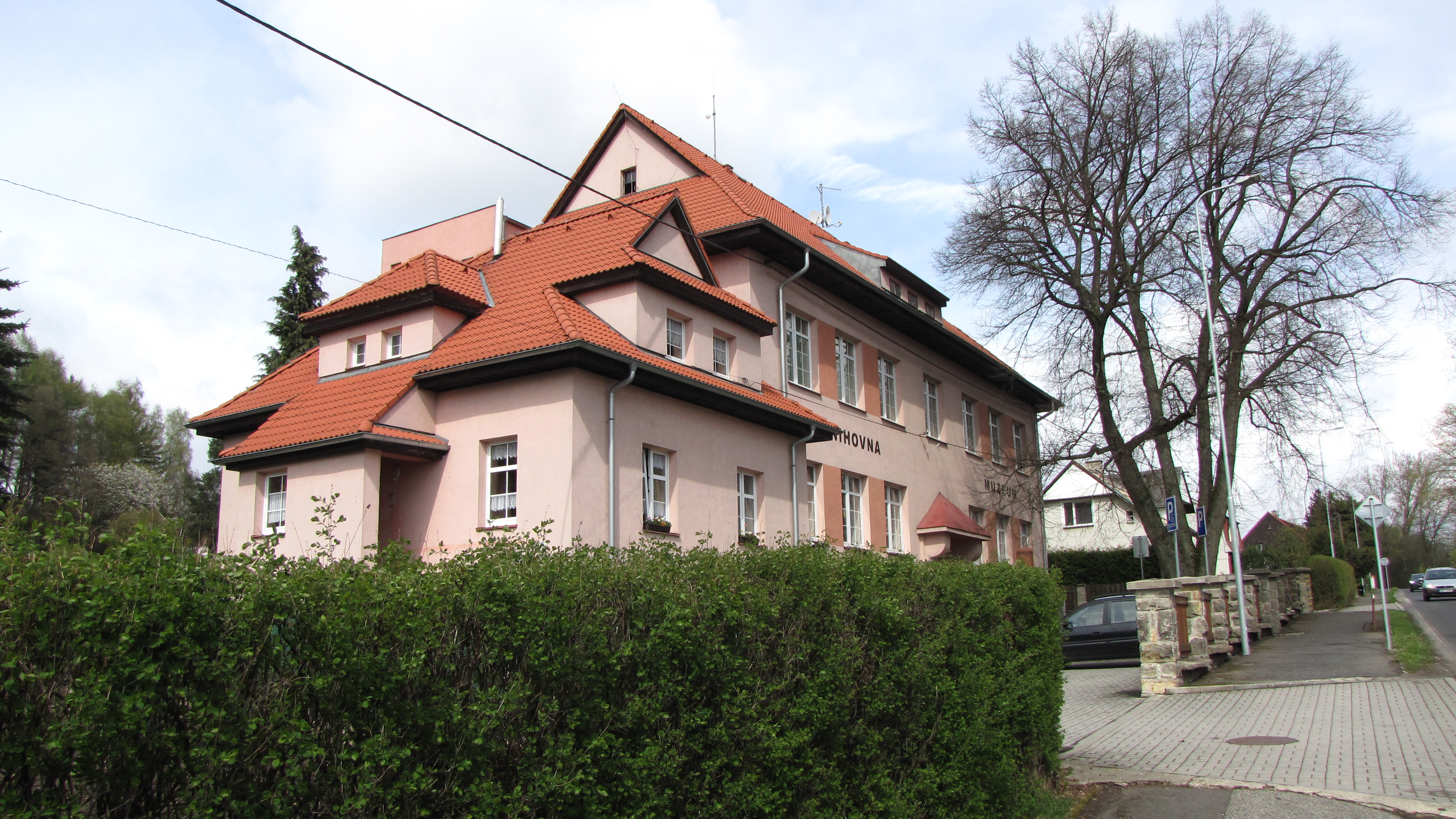
Museum and library

Habartov is poor in monuments, because most of the landmarks were destroyed due to coal mining. The only protected cultural monument is a pair of tombstones from the second half of the 19th century that belong to Johann Hochberger and Gustav Hochberger. They remind of the social position and work of the Hochbergers in the locality.

The Museum of the Law Enforcement is located in Habartov. It presents the history of law enforcement operating in the territory of the country in the years 1918–1948 and the historical events of 1938 in the region.

== Twin towns – sister cities ==
Habartov is twinned with:

- Bad Berneck, Germany
- Lengenfeld, Germany
