= Happurg subcamp =

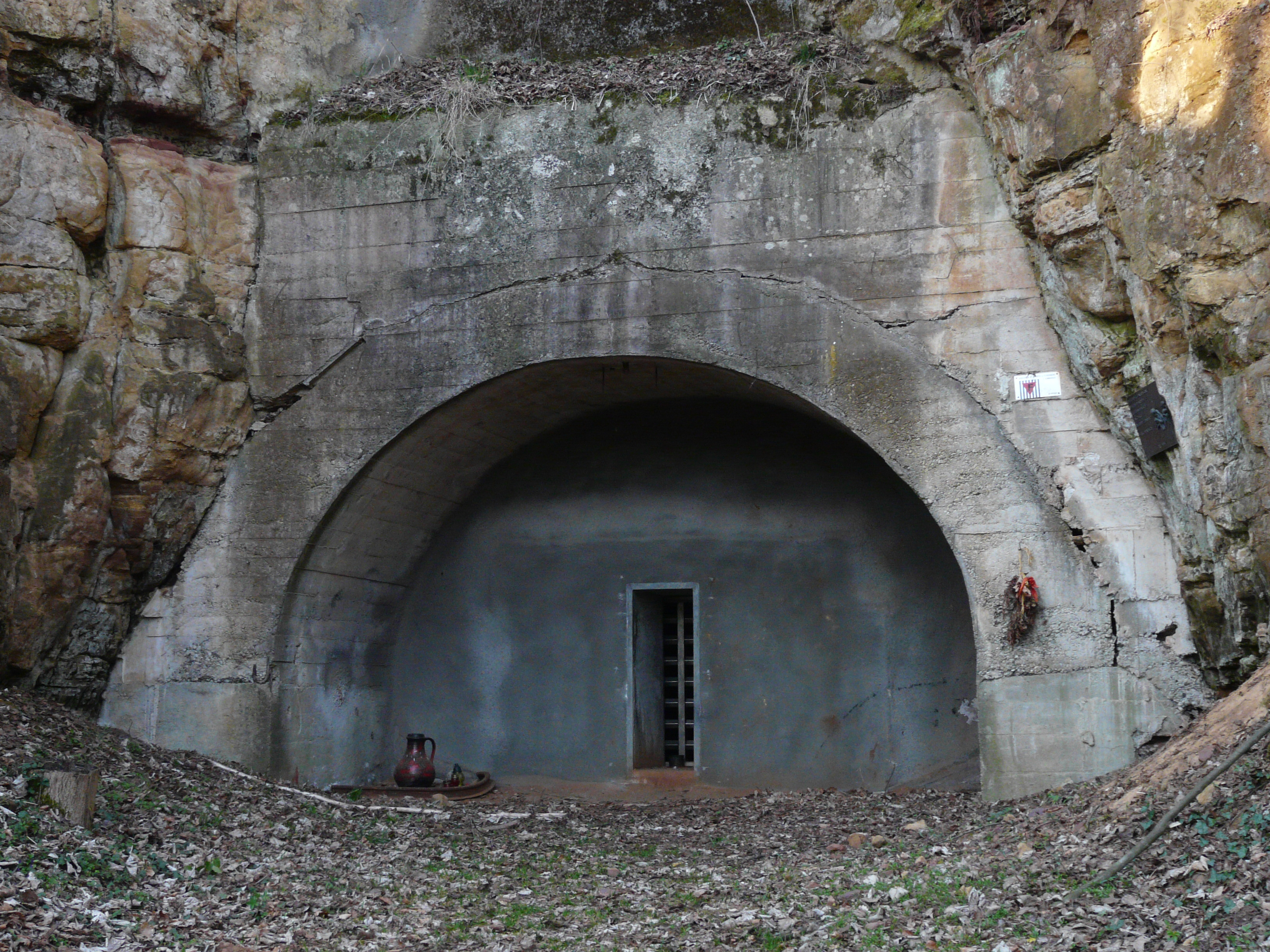
Entrance F to the Doggerstollen

The Doggerstollen was a subcamp of the Flossenbürg concentration camp in World War II, close to the village of Happurg. It was an underground factory, where the production of BMW aircraft engines was planned. The Doggerstollen was built by approximately 9500 prisoners of whom 4000 died ("Extermination through labor", German: Vernichtung durch Arbeit).

== History ==
The construction work began in May 1944 under the code name Dogger. The underground factory was planned to have an area of 120,000 square metres, as stated by Walter von Linden, director of the "Deutsche Schachtbau" (German Mine Shaft Construction), during one of the post-war trials. Under the guidance of 400 German miners, the prisoners had to work around the clock in shift operation. The companies AEG, Thosti, Tauber, Hochtief and Siemens Bau-Union were involved in the construction of the factory. Eight connected galleries were constructed by rock blasting. These contained factory halls five metres high and up to seven metres wide. Before the invasion of the US Army the mines reached a length of 4.03 kilometres. The prisoners had to walk a distance of 5 kilometres from the camp of Hersbruck to the construction site in Happurg every day.
