= Sokolov Basin =

Geomorphological region in the Czech Republic

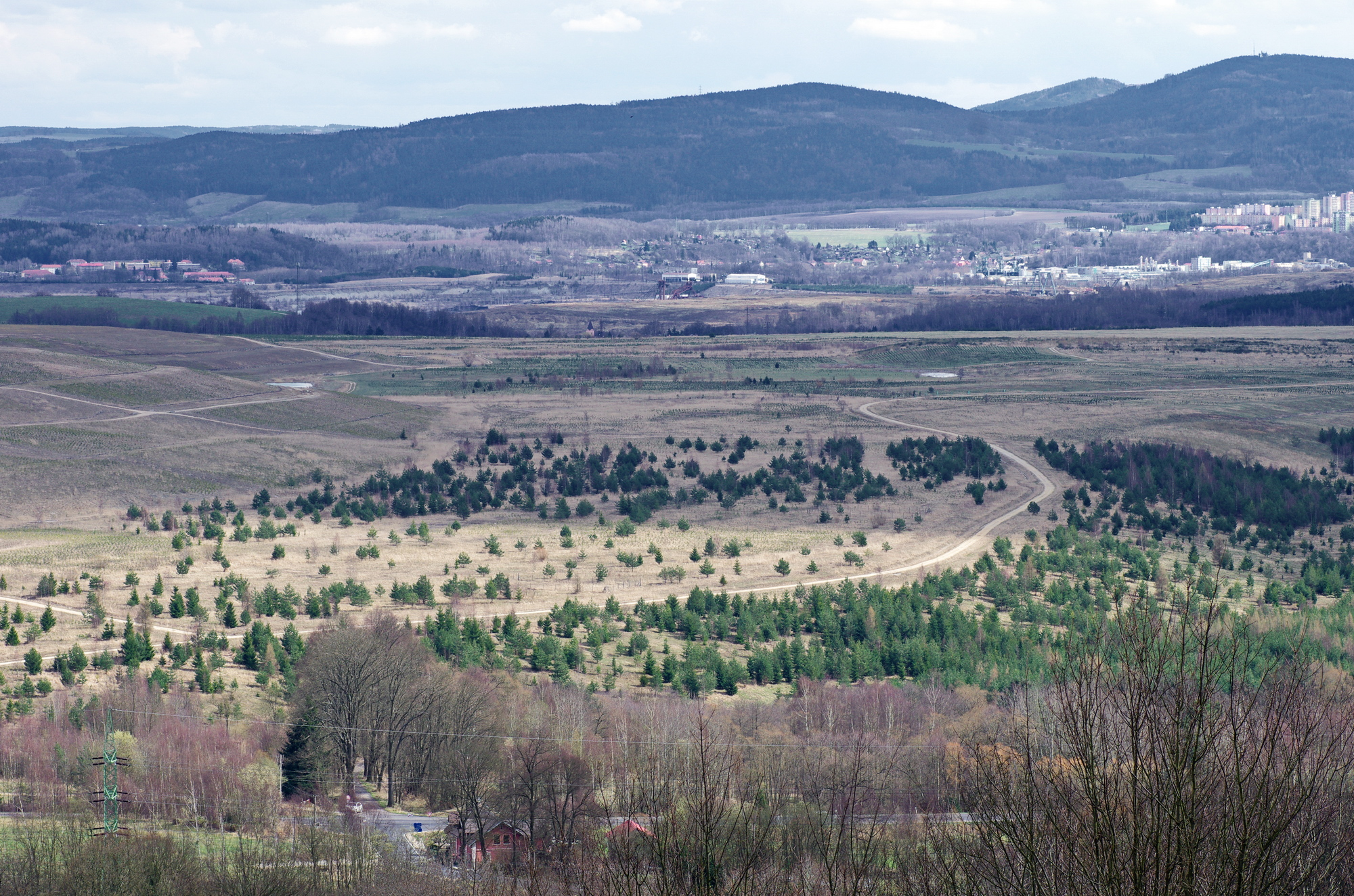
- Central part of the basin, Slavkov Forest in the background

Highest point
- Peak: Zelený vrch
- Elevation: 570 m (1,870 ft)

Dimensions
- Length: 36 km (22 mi)
- Area: 312 km^{2} (120 mi^{2})

Geography
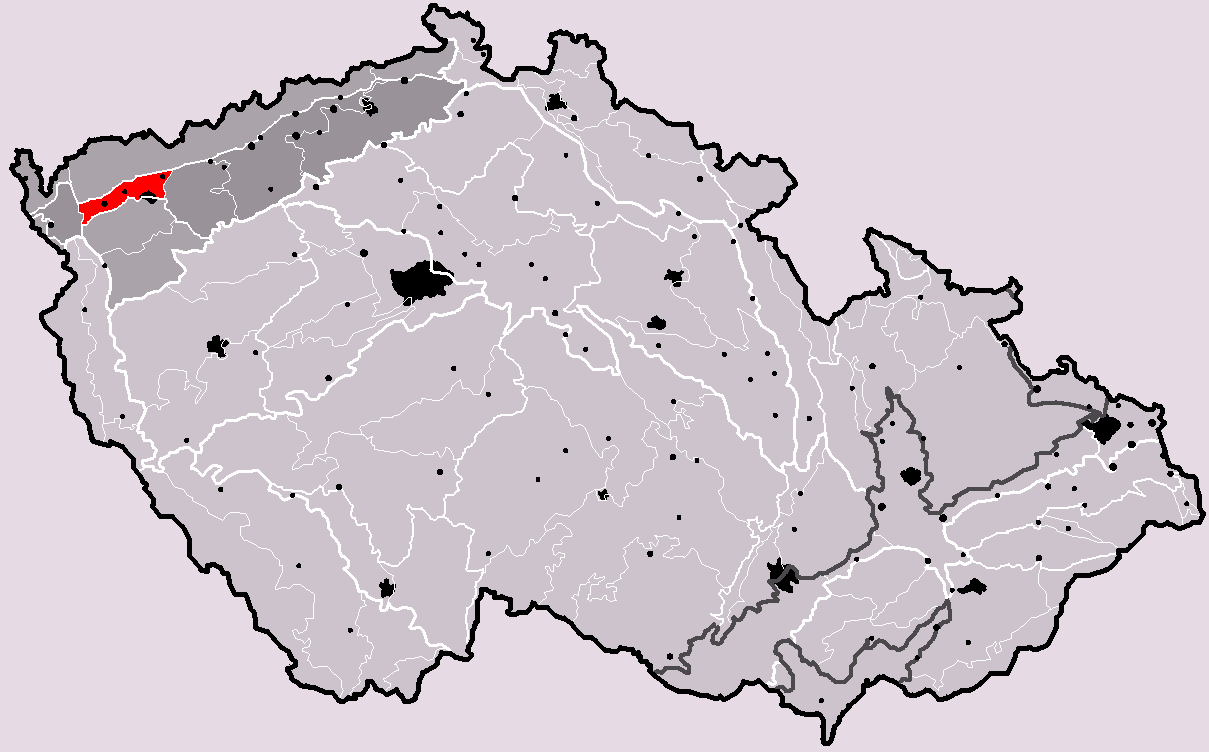
- Sokolov Basin in the geomorphological system of the Czech Republic
- Country: Czech Republic
- Regions: Karlovy Vary
- Range coordinates: 15°14′N 12°45′E
- Parent range: Podkrušnohorská Macroregion

The Sokolov Basin or Falkenau Basin (Czech: Sokolovská pánev; German: Falkenauer Becken, formerly also Falkenau-Elbogen-Karlsbader Becken) is a structural basin and geomorphological mesoregion of the Czech Republic. It is located in the central part of the Karlovy Vary Region. It is named after the town of Sokolov. It is known for its deposits of lignite, which has been extracted here to a greater extent since the second half of 19th century.

== Geomorphology ==
The Sokolov Basin is a mesoregion of the Podkrušnohorská Macroregion within the Bohemian Massif. It runs between two ranges: Ore Mountains in the north and Slavkov Forest in the south. It is no further subdivided into microregions.

The highest peak of the Sokolov Basin used to be Dvorský vrch with an elevation of 573 m (1,880 ft), but its top was mined away. Now the highest peak is Zelený vrch at 570 m (1,870 ft).

== Geography ==
The Sokolov Basin is 36 km (22 mi) long, 9 km (6 mi) wide, and has an area of 312 km^{2} (120 sq mi). The territory has an elongated shape from southwest to northeast.

The Ohře River flows across the entire territory and drains it. Smaller rivers, such as Svatava, Rolava and Bystřice, flow into it from the mountain ranges along the territory.

Suitable natural conditions contributed to the creation of many settlements in the Sokolov Basin. Most populous cities and towns in the territory are Karlovy Vary, Sokolov, Ostrov, Chodov and Nová Role.

== Economy ==
The basin is known for lignite mining. It started here on a small scale around 1760 and fully developed after the construction of the railway in 1871. It experienced its peak in the second half of the 20th century, when mining took place mainly underground. Today, mining takes place in a surface mine.

== Gallery ==
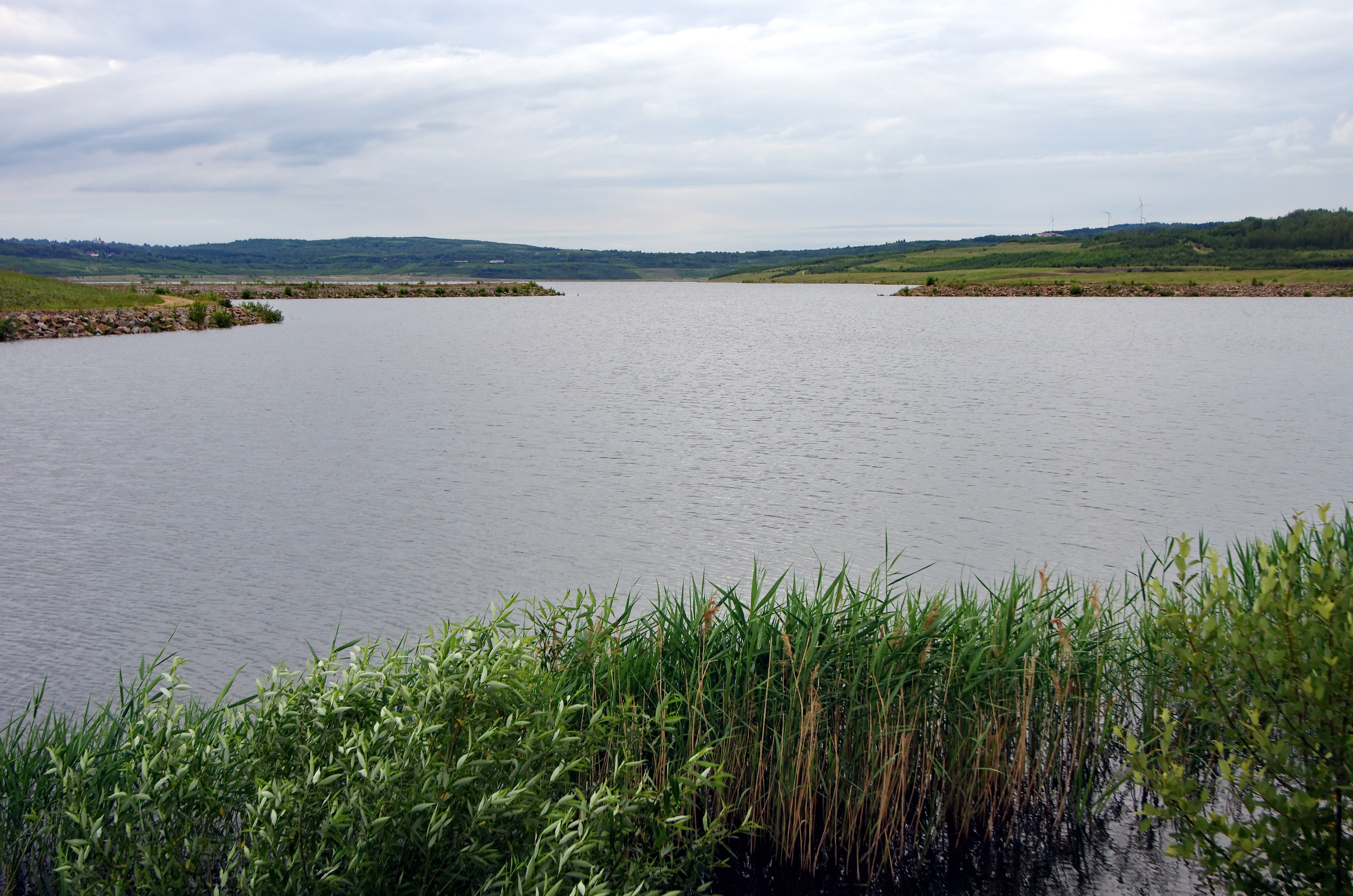
Medard Lake

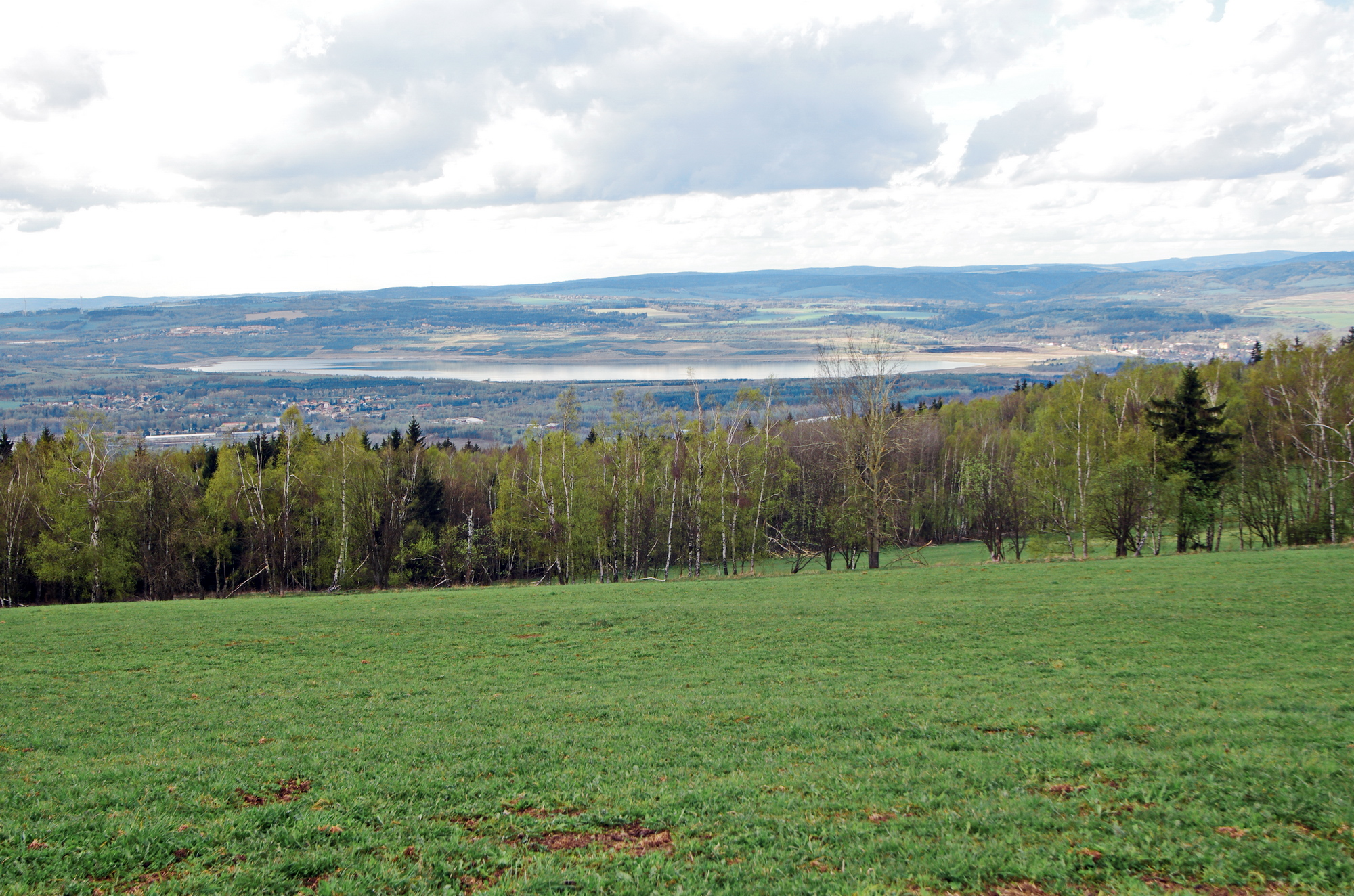
Medard Lake and surrounding landscape

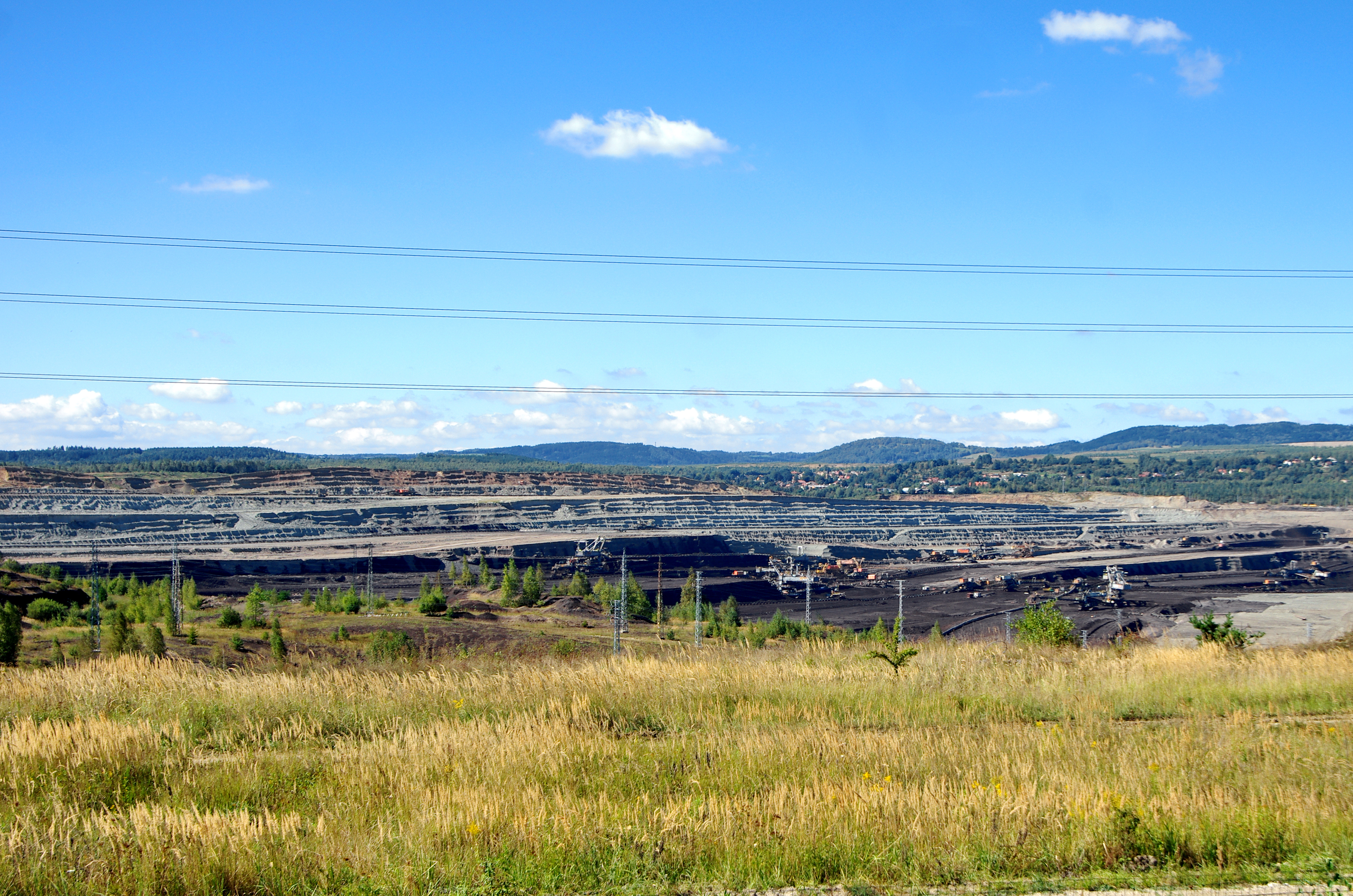
Jiří lignite mine
