= Neurohlau concentration camp =

Coordinates: 50°16′27″N 12°46′43″E

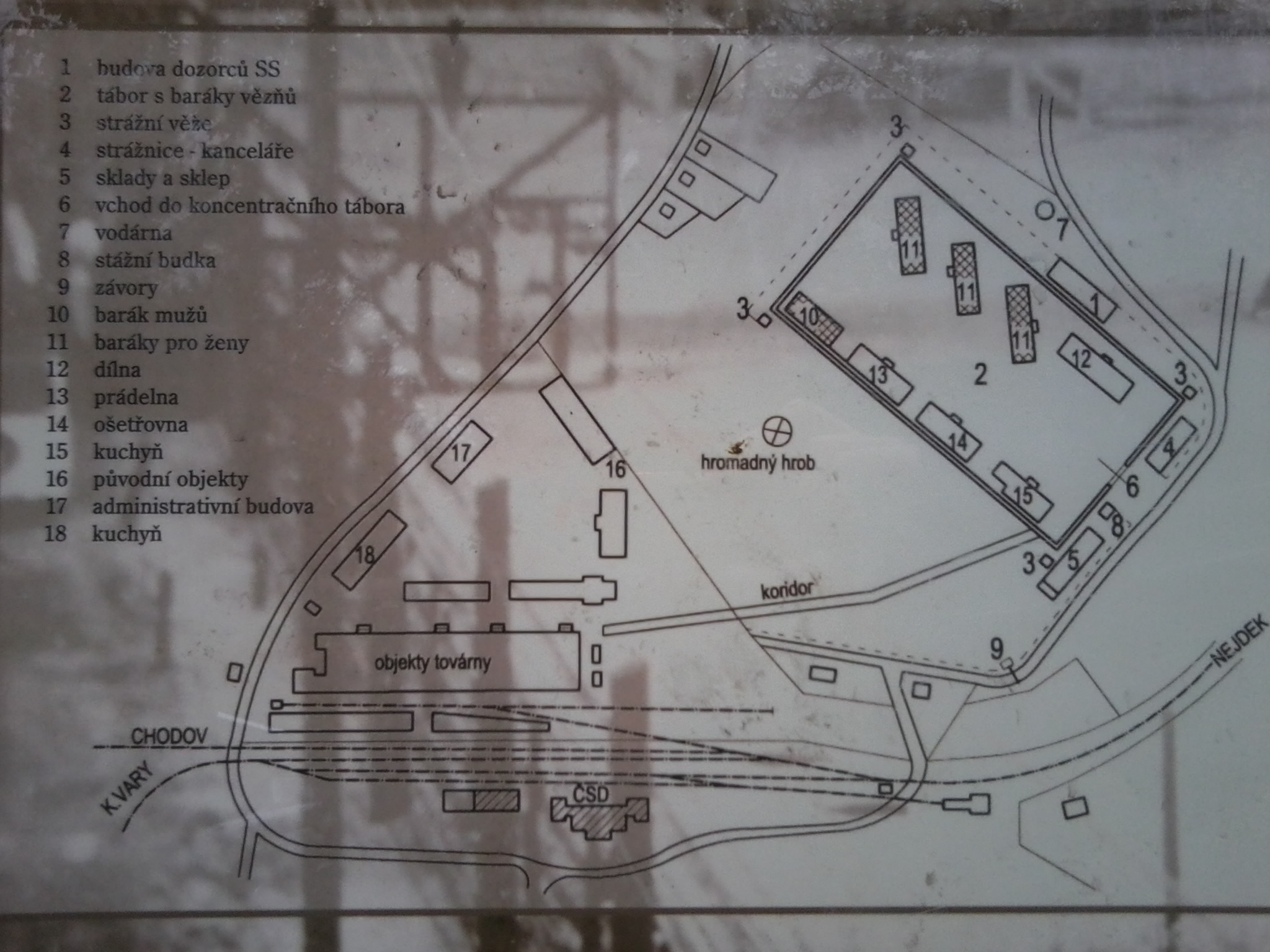
The plan of the camp, standing near the memorial in front of the train station in Nová Role

Neurohlau (Czech: Koncentrační tábor Nová Role) was a subcamp of Flossenbürg concentration camp, mainly for women prisoners of several European nationalities including Czech, Soviet, Yugoslavian, Belgian, Polish, and German. It was located on the edge of the municipality Neurohlau (now Nová Role) in the historical territory of Sudetenland (in the present-day Czech Republic). The Germans founded the camp in the autumn of 1942 and closed it in April 1945. Its main purpose was providing workers for the nearby Bohemia porcelain factory. At least 41 prisoners died in the camp (unearthed from the mass grave in June 1945); about 500 died during the death march out in April 1945; an unknown number died after their deportation back to the mother camps (Ravensbrück and Flossenbürg); and some others were burnt in the camp in Karlovy Vary. After World War II, the camp served as a collecting camp for prisoners of war before their removal to Germany.
