= Nové Hamry =

- Municipality
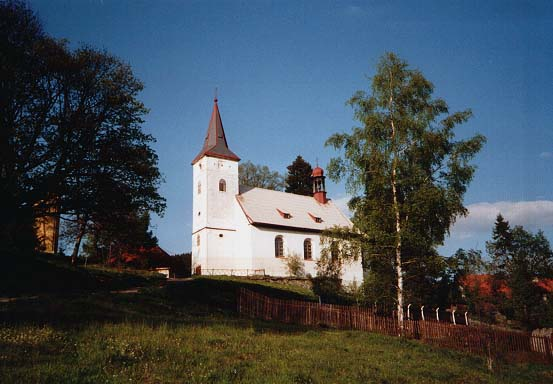
- Church of Saint John of Nepomuk

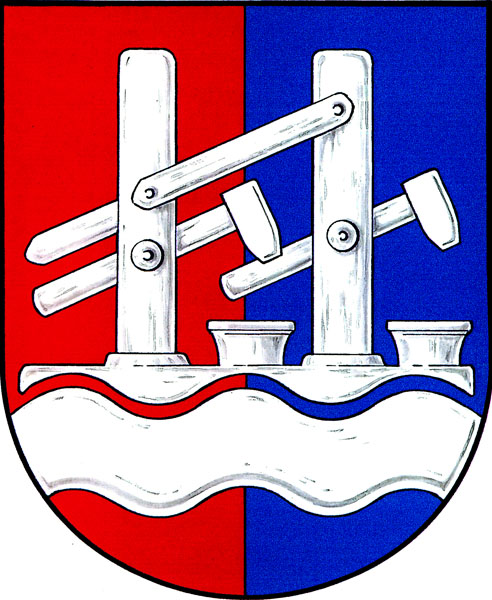
- Flag Coat of arms

- Location in the Czech Republic
- Coordinates: 50°21′37″N 12°43′9″E
- Country: Czech Republic
- Region: Karlovy Vary
- District: Karlovy Vary
- First mentioned: 1654

Area
  - Total: 25.11 km^{2} (9.70 sq mi)
- Elevation: 693 m (2,274 ft)

Population (2026-01-01)
  - Total: 354
  - Density: 14.1/km^{2} (36.5/sq mi)
- Time zone: UTC+1 (CET)
  - Summer (DST): UTC+2 (CEST)
- Postal code: 362 24
- Website: www.novehamry.eu

Nové Hamry (German: Neuhammer) is a municipality and village in Karlovy Vary District in the Karlovy Vary Region of the Czech Republic. It has about 400 inhabitants.

== Demographics ==
Historical population
Year	Pop.	±%
1869	2,731	—
1880	2,849	+4.3%
1890	2,795	−1.9%
1900	2,606	−6.8%
1910	2,916	+11.9%
1921	2,599	−10.9%
1930	2,784	+7.1%
1950	483	−82.7%
1961	624	+29.2%
1970	462	−26.0%
1980	316	−31.6%
1991	260	−17.7%
2001	280	+7.7%
2011	318	+13.6%
2021	314	−1.3%
Source: Censuses
