= Nejdek =

- Town
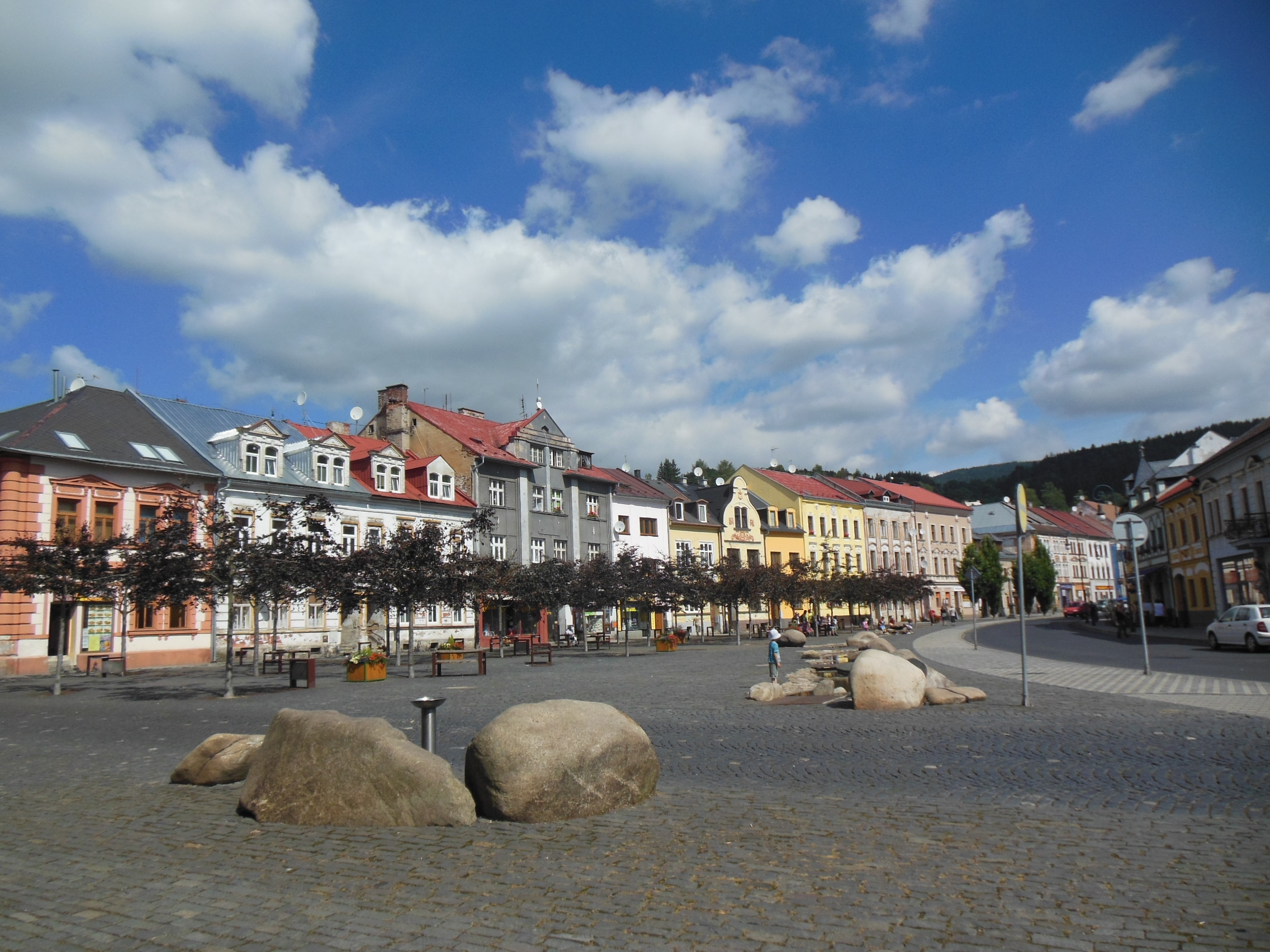
- Town square

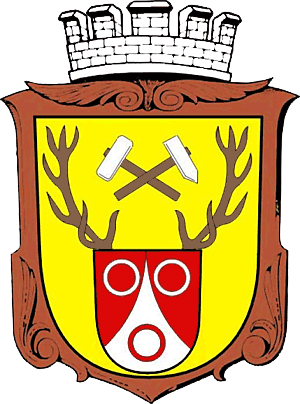
- Flag Coat of arms

- Location in the Czech Republic
- Coordinates: 50°19′21″N 12°43′46″E
- Country: Czech Republic
- Region: Karlovy Vary
- District: Karlovy Vary
- First mentioned: 1340

Government
  - Mayor: Ludmila Vocelková (ANO)

Area
  - Total: 52.27 km^{2} (20.18 sq mi)
- Elevation: 568 m (1,864 ft)

Population (2026-01-01)
  - Total: 7,647
  - Density: 146.3/km^{2} (378.9/sq mi)
- Time zone: UTC+1 (CET)
  - Summer (DST): UTC+2 (CEST)
- Postal code: 362 21
- Website: www.nejdek.cz

Nejdek (Czech pronunciation: [ˈnɛjdɛk]; German: Neudek) is a town in Karlovy Vary District in the Karlovy Vary Region of the Czech Republic. It has about 7,600 inhabitants. The town is located on the Rolava River in the Ore Mountains. The main landmark of Nejdek is a Romanesque-Gothic bell tower.

== Administrative division ==
Nejdek consists of ten municipal parts (in brackets population according to the 2021 census):

- Nejdek (6,352)
- Bernov (270)
- Fojtov (134)
- Lesík (55)
- Lužec (16)
- Oldřichov (12)
- Pozorka (312)
- Suchá (298)
- Tisová (146)
- Vysoká Štola (6)

== Etymology ==
The name originated from German neue Decke, i.e. 'new cover'. It was derived from the newly covered roof of the castle tower.

== Geography ==
Nejdek is located about 13 kilometres (8 mi) northwest of Karlovy Vary. It lies in the west of the Ore Mountains. The highest point is the mountain Tisovský vrch at 977 m (3,205 ft) above sea level. The Rolava River flows through the town.

== History ==
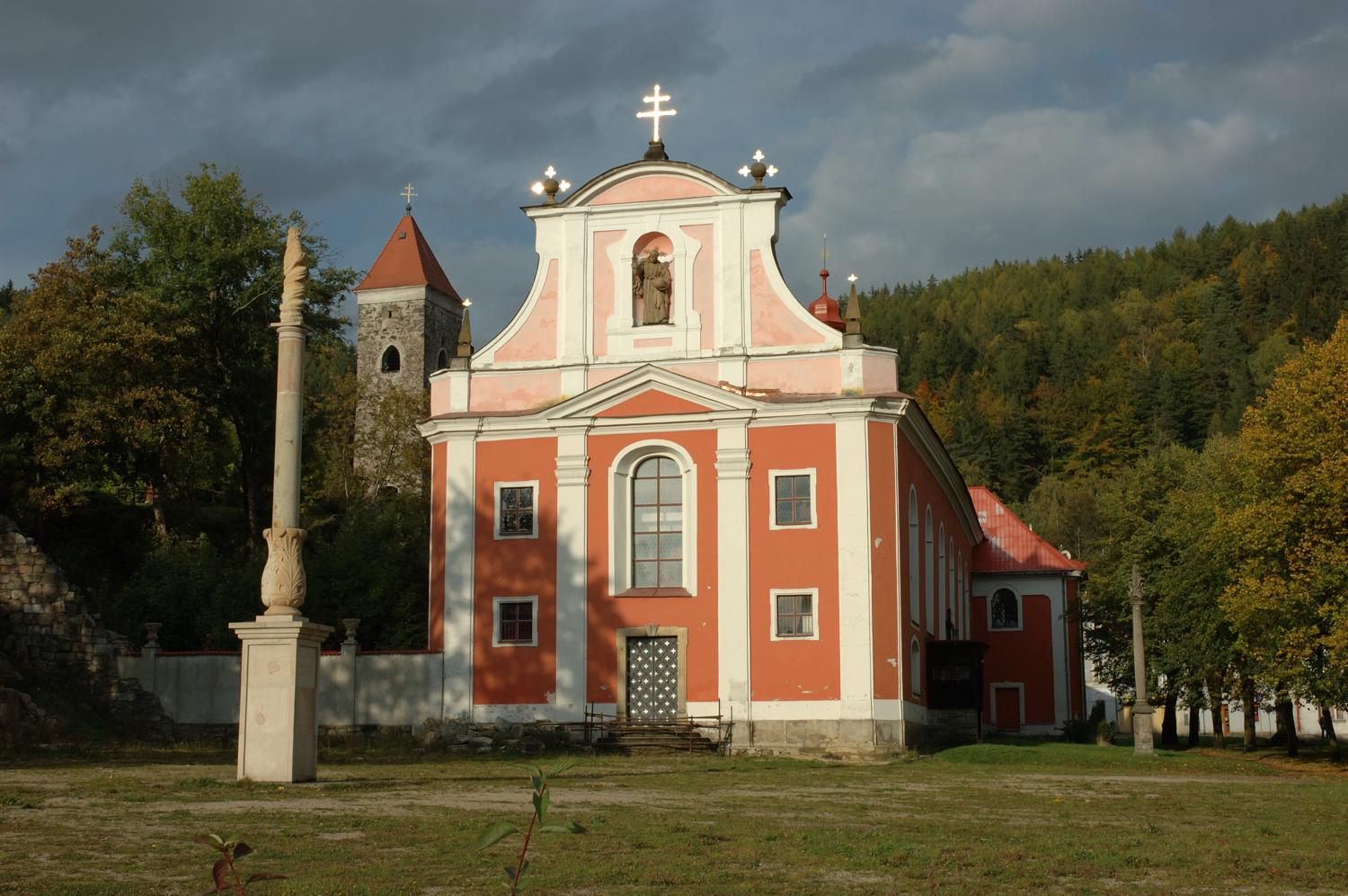
Church of Saint Martin

Nejdek was founded around 1250 as a tin mining settlement. The first written mention of Nejdek is from 1340. During the golden era of tin mining in the 14th–16th century, the town experienced its greatest expansion. From 1446 to 1602, it was owned by the Schlick family. During their rule, iron ore also began to be mined, and smelters and hammer mills were established in the area.

In 1602–1633, the Nejdek estate was owned by the Collon family, and violent re-Catholicisation took place. During this period, many inhabitants left and there was a decline in mining.

In the 19th century, the town was industrialised. Ironworks and spinning mill were established. In 1899, the Karlovy Vary–Johanngeorgenstadt railway was put into operation.

== Demographics ==
Historical population

Year	Pop.	±%
1869	6,724	—
1880	7,747	+15.2%
1890	7,651	−1.2%
1900	9,122	+19.2%
1910	11,678	+28.0%

Year	Pop.	±%
1921	11,626	−0.4%
1930	14,556	+25.2%
1950	7,984	−45.1%
1961	8,423	+5.5%
1970	8,787	+4.3%

Year	Pop.	±%
1980	8,893	+1.2%
1991	8,180	−8.0%
2001	8,600	+5.1%
2011	8,145	−5.3%
2021	7,601	−6.7%

Source: Censuses

== Transport ==
Nejdek is located on the Karlovy Vary–Johanngeorgenstadt railway line. The municipal territory is served by six train stations and stops.

== Sights ==
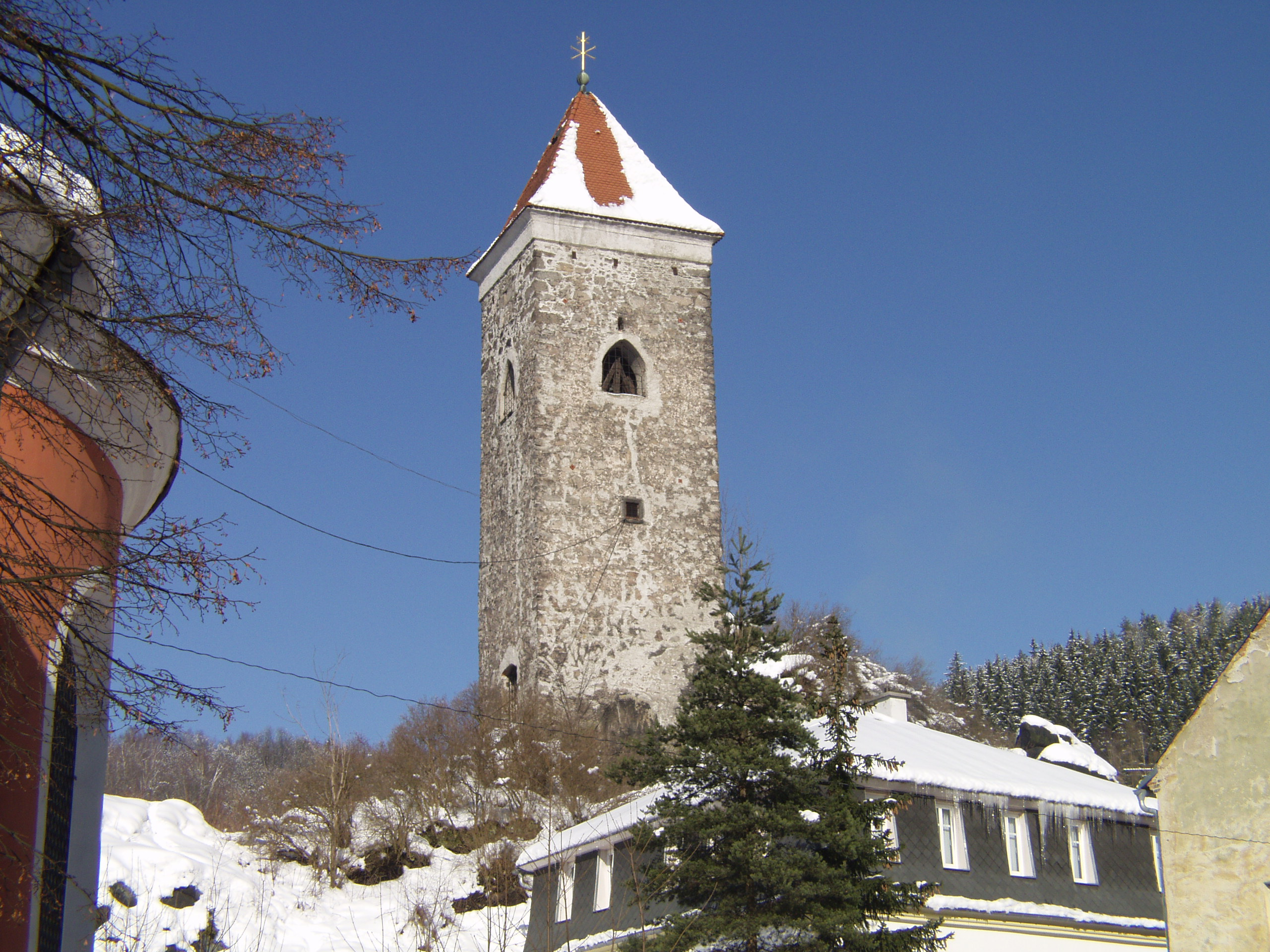
Castle tower

The Romanesque-Gothic tower is the most important monument in Nejdek. It is a remnant of a castle, which was built around 1250 to protect a trade route. It was inhabited until 1790. Today the tower serves as a bell tower and contains a rare Renaissance bell.

The Church of Saint Martin was first mentioned in 1354. The small Gothic church was rebuilt and extended several times, it current appearance with Rococo equipment is from 1755–1756.

Nejdek Château was built approximately in 1650–1653. It was originally a two-storey castle, it was destroyed by fire in 1857 and completely rebuilt in the pseudo-Baroque style with pseudo-Renaissance and pseudo-Gothic elements.

Nejdek Stations of the Cross was built in 1851–1858 and leads to the top of the hill Křížový vrch.

Pajndl is an observation tower located on Tisovský vrch. It is a 24 metres (79 ft)-high stone tower that dates from 1897. It is a cultural monument.

== Notable people ==
- Ignatius Sichelbart (1708–1780), German Jesuit missionary
- Wenceslaus Linck (1736–1797), German Jesuit missionary
- Vladimír Ráž (1923–2000), actor
- Ewald Körner (1926–2010), German clarinetist and conductor

== Twin towns – sister cities ==
Nejdek is twinned with:

- Johanngeorgenstadt, Germany
