= Sokolov, Czech Republic =

Town in the Czech Republic

Sokolov
- Town
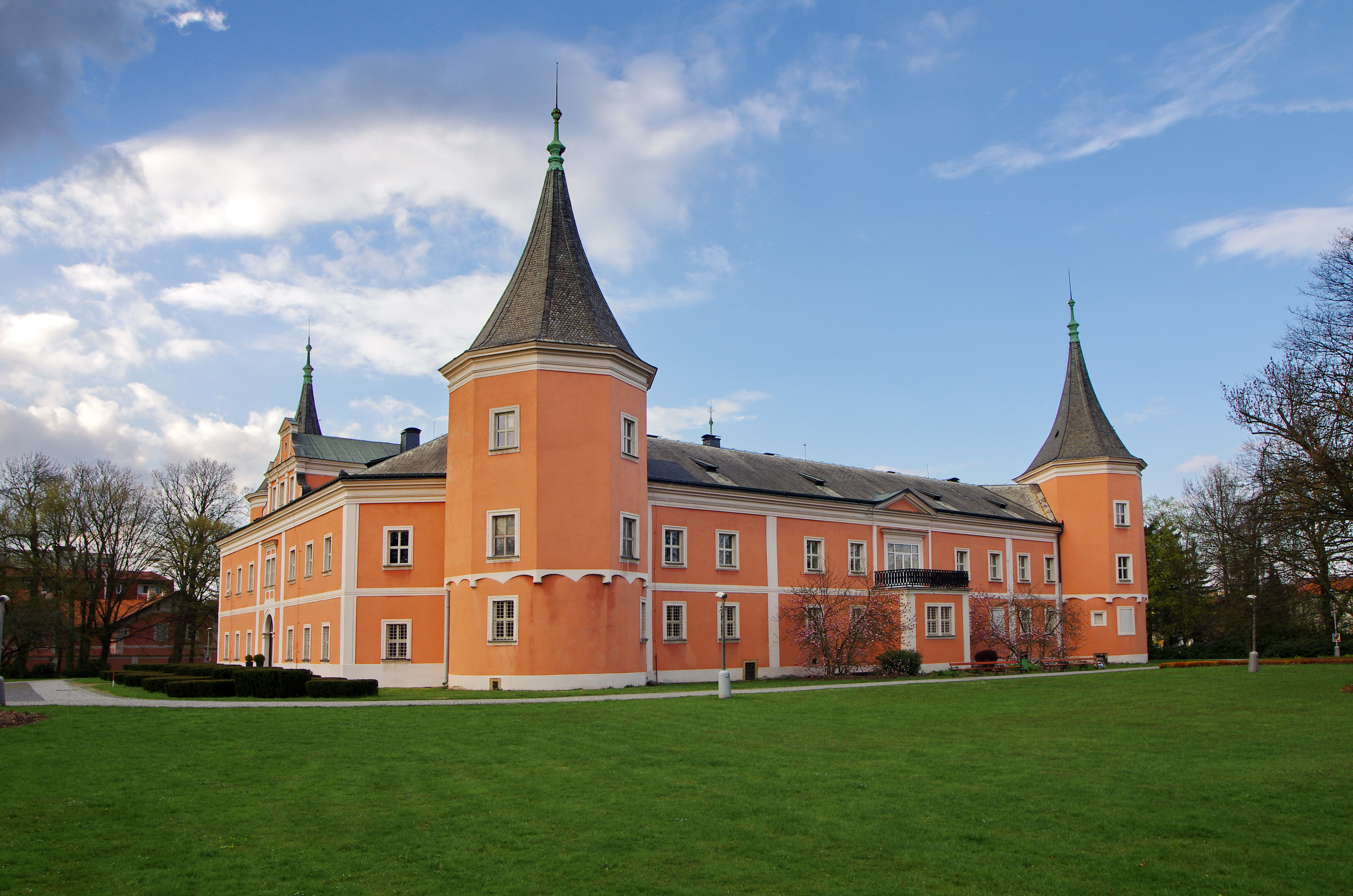
- Sokolov Castle

- Flag Coat of arms

- Location in the Czech Republic
- Coordinates: 50°10′53″N 12°38′25″E
- Country: Czech Republic
- Region: Karlovy Vary
- District: Sokolov
- First mentioned: 1279

Government
  - Mayor: Renata Oulehlová (ANO)

Area
  - Total: 22.92 km^{2} (8.85 sq mi)
- Elevation: 401 m (1,316 ft)

Population (2026-01-01)
  - Total: 21,908
  - Density: 955.8/km^{2} (2,476/sq mi)
- Time zone: UTC+1 (CET)
  - Summer (DST): UTC+2 (CEST)
- Postal code: 356 01
- Website: www.sokolov.cz

Sokolov (Czech pronunciation: [ˈsokolof]; until 1948 Falknov nad Ohří; German: Falkenau an der Eger) is a town in the Karlovy Vary Region of the Czech Republic. It has about 22,000 inhabitants. The town is located on the Ohře River in the Sokolov Basin, the region known for lignite mining. The most valuable monuments of Sokolov are the Church of Saint James the Great and Sokolov Castle.

== Administrative division ==
Sokolov consists of four municipal parts (in brackets population according to the 2021 census):

- Sokolov (21,194)
- Hrušková (74)
- Novina (16)
- Vítkov (200)

== Etymology ==
The meaning of the original German name Falkenau was "falcon's riparian forest". The original Czech name Falknov was created by transcription of the German name. According to legend, it was related to hobby of knight Sebastian, who is said to have been the founder of the town, of falconry. After World War II, when it was customary to change names of German origin, the town was renamed Sokolov. According to communist propaganda at the time, the name was not related to a falcon (i.e. sokol in Czech), but to the Battle of Sokolovo, in which Czechoslovak soldiers had fought alongside Soviet soldiers on the Eastern Front in World War II.

== Geography ==
Sokolov is located about 16 kilometres (10 mi) southwest of Karlovy Vary. It lies mostly in the Sokolov Basin. The eastern part of the municipal territory extends into the Slavkov Forest and includes the highest point of Sokolov, the hill Zelený močál at 797 m (2,615 ft) above sea level. The Ohře River flows through the town.

On the eastern outskirts of the town there is Lake Michal, an artificial lake created by flooding of former coal quarry. It has an area of 30 ha (74 acres) and serves recreational purposes.

== History ==
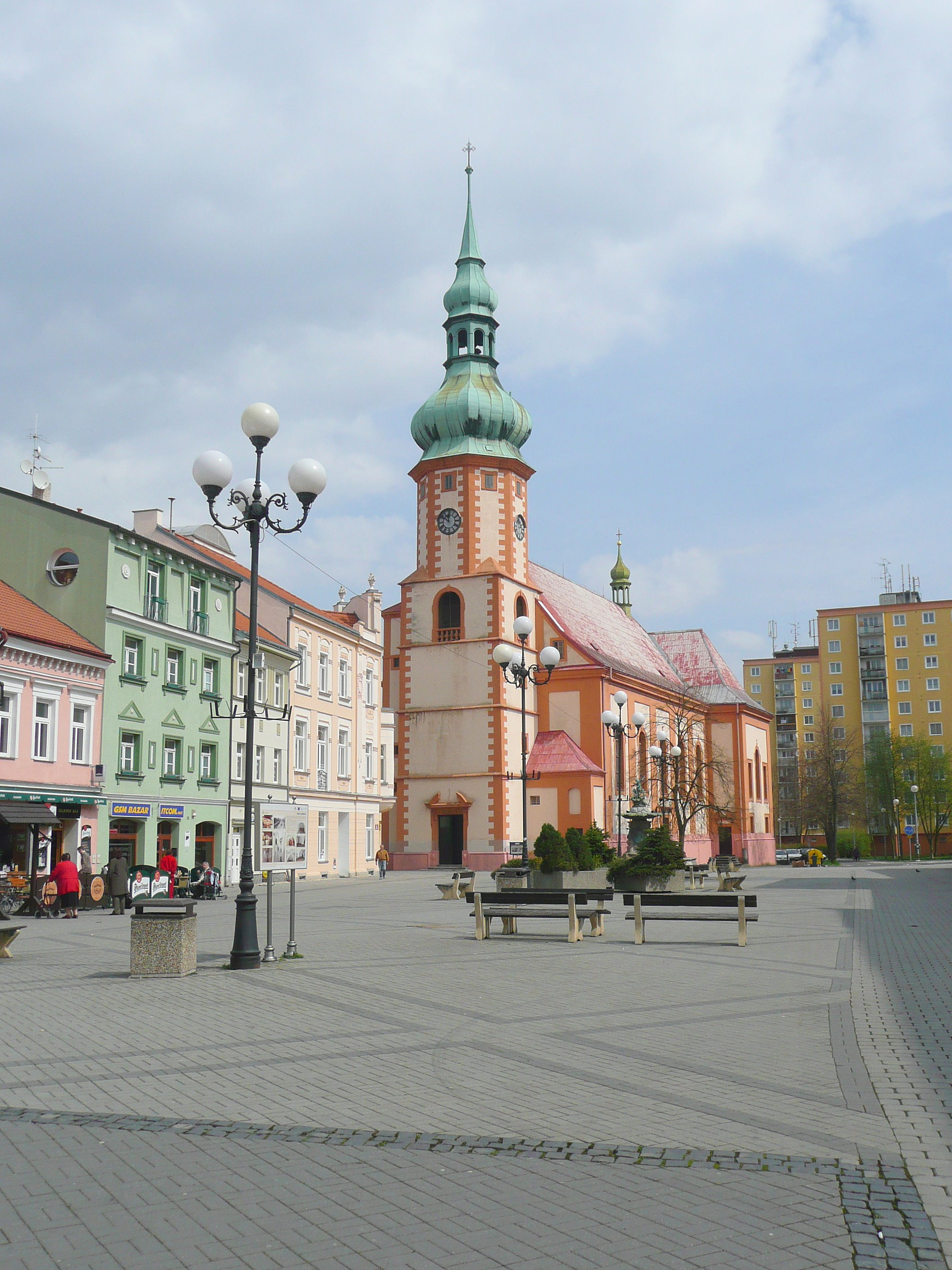
Church of Saint James the Great in the historical centre

The first written mention of Sokolov is from 13 April 1279 under the name Falkenau / Falknov. The town was a property of the noble families of Nothaft and later Schlick. The Schlick family had built here a small castle, which was rebuilt in the 16th century.

After the Battle of White Mountain, the Nostitz family gained Sokolov. During the Thirty Years' War the town and the castle was repeatedly burned out. The town and the castle was recovered in the 1760s by Johann Hartwig of Nostitz-Rieneck. In the 18th century, there was a great expansion of urban crafts and hop growing.

From 1867 to 1918, the town was part of Austria-Hungary. In 1919, the town, being part of the continuous German Sprachraum, was proclaimed part of the Republic of German-Austria, but shortly afterwards became part of the First Czechoslovak Republic.

From 1938 to 1945, the town was occupied by Nazi Germany and administered as part of the Reichsgau Sudetenland. During World War II, in April 1941, the Stalag 359 prisoner-of-war camp was established in the town by the occupiers, however, it was relocated to Poniatowa in German-occupied Poland in September 1941. The town was also the site of a sub-camp of the Flossenbürg concentration camp, which was liberated the U.S. 1st Infantry Division on 6 May 1945. Nearly all of the town's German-speaking population was expelled after 1945 in accordance with the Potsdam Agreement.

== Demographics ==
Historical population

Year	Pop.	±%
1869	4,370	—
1880	5,250	+20.1%
1890	6,530	+24.4%
1900	8,679	+32.9%
1910	10,126	+16.7%

Year	Pop.	±%
1921	11,429	+12.9%
1930	12,647	+10.7%
1950	9,777	−22.7%
1961	15,242	+55.9%
1970	18,256	+19.8%

Year	Pop.	±%
1980	24,763	+35.6%
1991	25,210	+1.8%
2001	25,081	−0.5%
2011	23,347	−6.9%
2021	21,484	−8.0%

Source: Censuses

== Economy ==
The region is known for mining of lignite. The largest employer based in the town is Sokolovská uhelná, a major Czech mining company.

== Transport ==
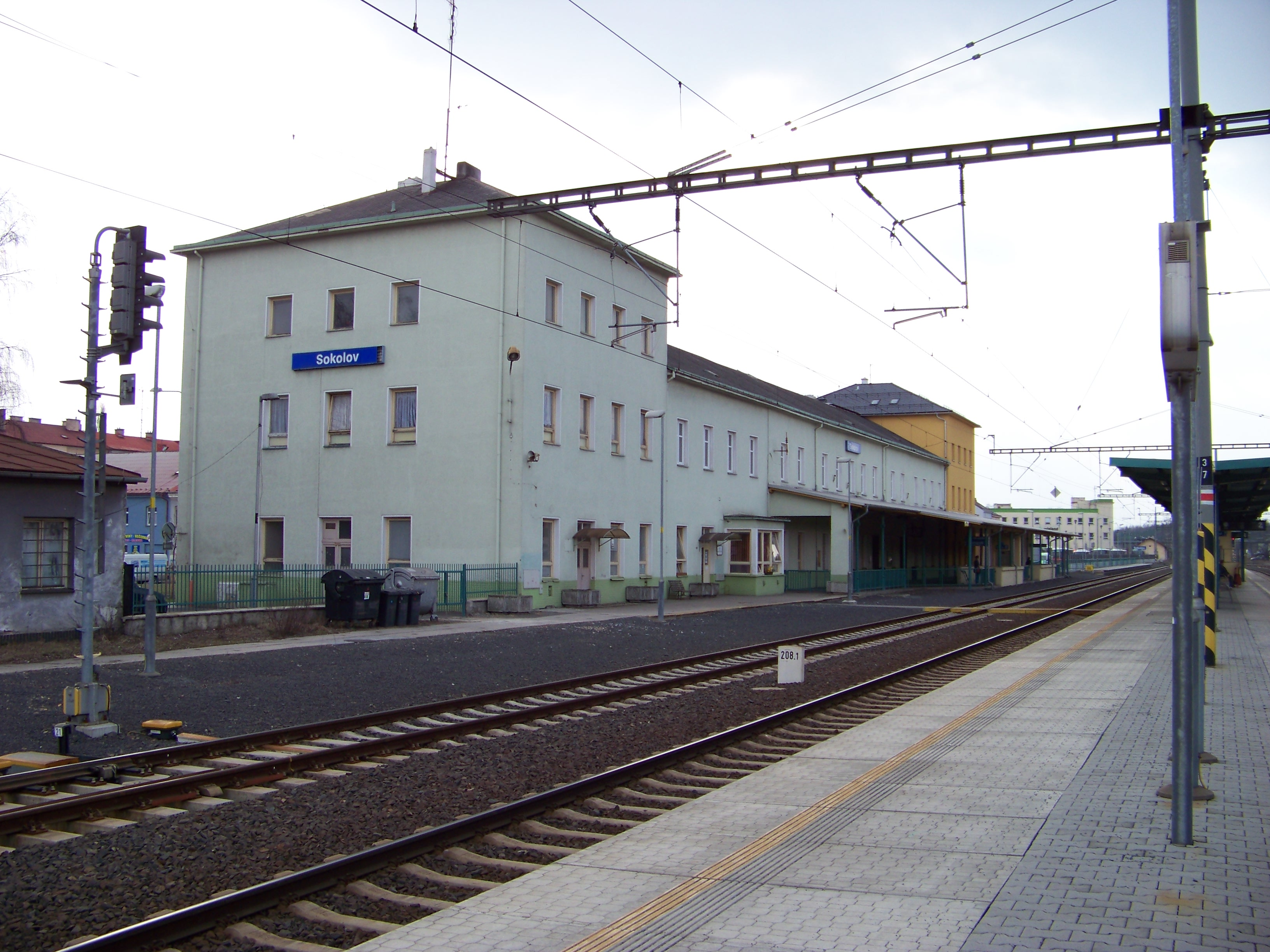
Train station

The D6 motorway from Karlovy Vary to Cheb runs through the town.

Sokolov is located on the major railway lines Prague–Cheb and Plzeň–Karlovy Vary. The town is also the starting point of a railway line heading to Kraslice and Mehltheuer in Germany.

== Sport ==
The town is home to the football club FK Baník Sokolov. It used to play in the Czech National Football League (second tier), but since 2020 has been playing in lower amateur tiers.

== Sights ==
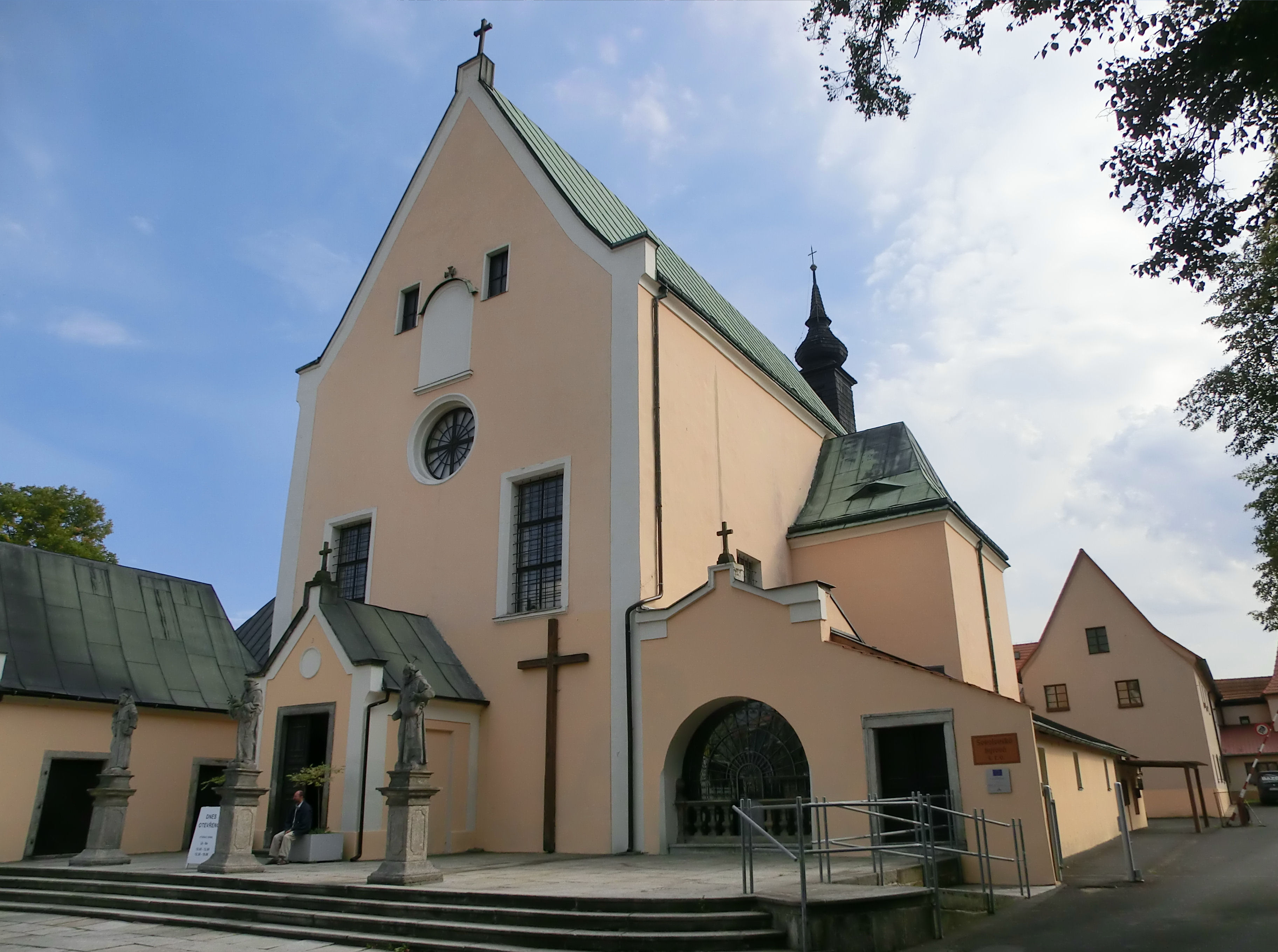
Former Capuchin monastery

The Church of Saint James the Great is among the main landmarks of the town centre. It was first documented in the 13th century and rebuilt in the late Renaissance style in 1632–1637. In 1671–1681, it was modified in the early Baroque style. The church tower is built in the spirit of the Saxon Renaissance.

The Sokolov Castle was built on the site of a former water fortress in late Renaissance and early Baroque styles. In 1800–1805, the building was modified in the Neoclassical style. Since 1960, the castle has been the seat of the Regional Museum, focused mainly on the development of mining and the history of the region.

A cultural monument is the former Capuchin monastery with the Church of Saint Anthony of Padua. It dates from the end of the 17th century. Today, the premises of the monastery are privately owned and the premises of the church serve as a concert and exhibition hall.

== Notable people ==
- Ernst Hammer (1884–1957), German military officer
- Václav Blažek (born 1959), historical linguist
- Štefan Füle (born 1962), diplomat
- Zuzana Kirchnerová (born 1978), film director
- Markéta Vondroušová (born 1999), tennis player

== Twin towns – sister cities ==
Sokolov is twinned with:

- Saalfeld, Germany
- Schwandorf, Germany
