= Libočany =

- Municipality
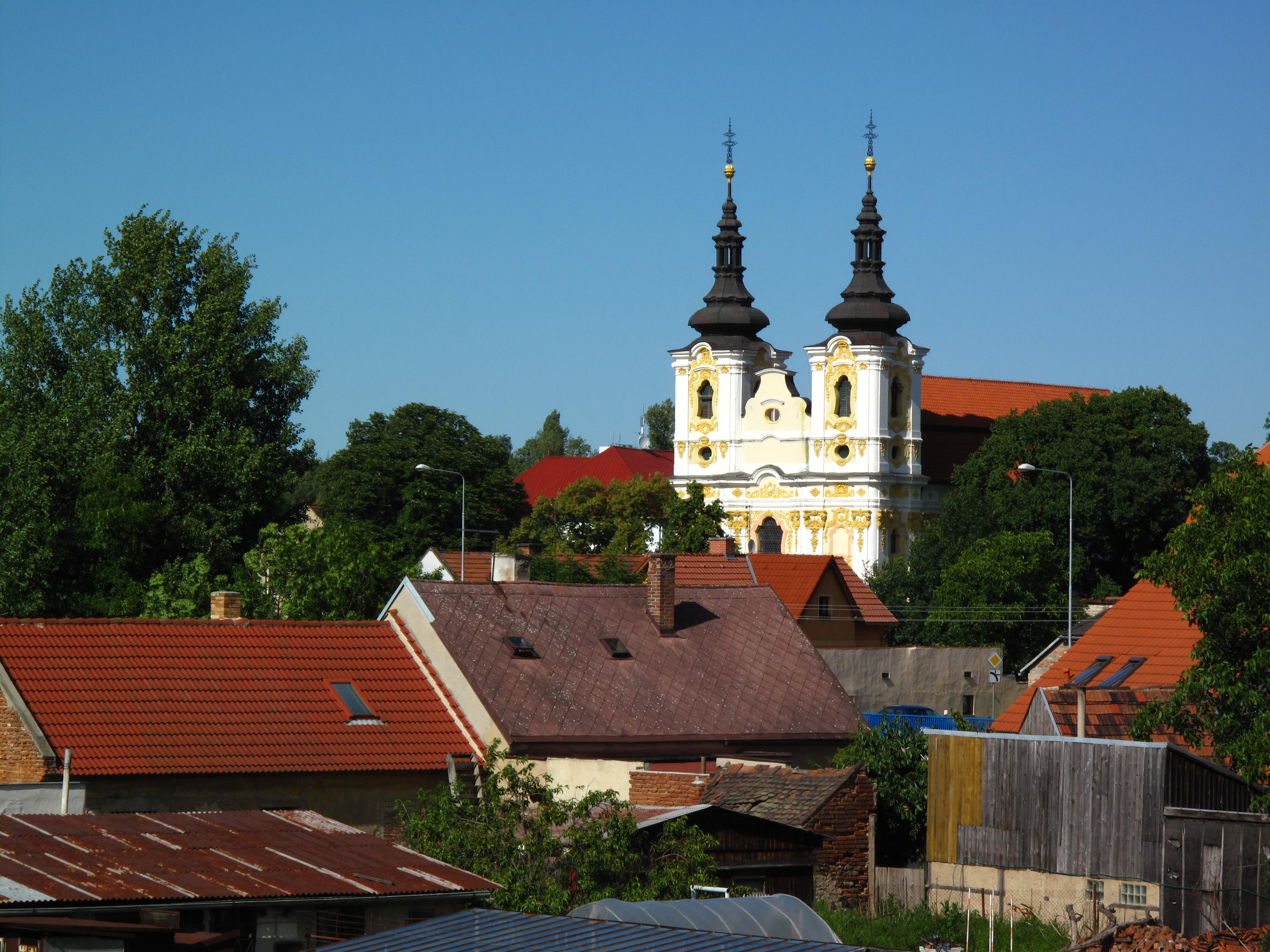
- Church of All Saints

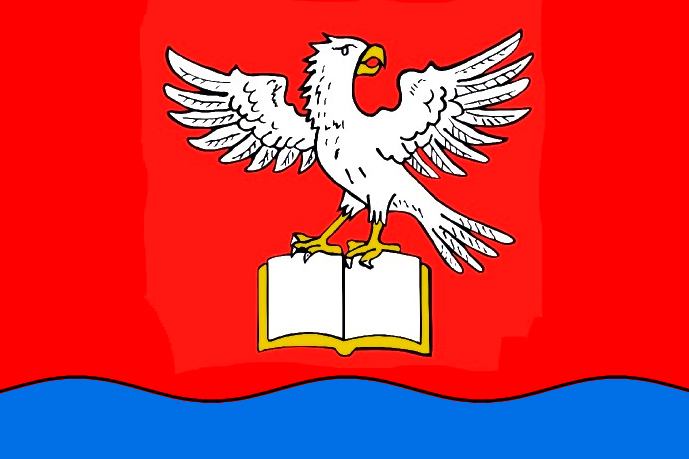
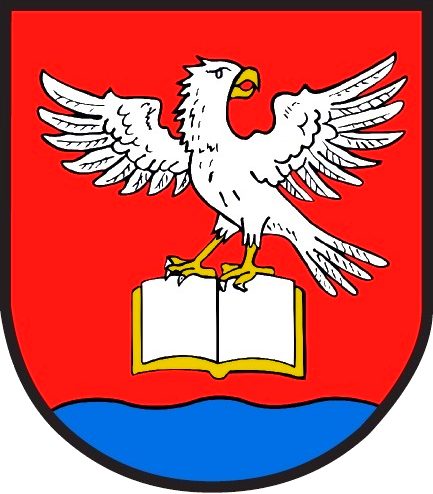
- Flag Coat of arms

- Location in the Czech Republic
- Coordinates: 50°20′0″N 13°30′49″E
- Country: Czech Republic
- Region: Ústí nad Labem
- District: Louny
- First mentioned: 1226

Area
  - Total: 5.69 km^{2} (2.20 sq mi)
- Elevation: 205 m (673 ft)

Population (2026-01-01)
  - Total: 535
  - Density: 94.0/km^{2} (244/sq mi)
- Time zone: UTC+1 (CET)
  - Summer (DST): UTC+2 (CEST)
- Postal code: 439 75
- Website: www.libocany.cz

Libočany (Czech pronunciation: [ˈlɪbotʃanɪ]; German: Libotschan) is a municipality and village in Louny District in the Ústí nad Labem Region of the Czech Republic. It has about 500 inhabitants. The municipality is located in the Most Basin, near the confluence of the Ohře and Liboc rivers.

Libočany is known for growing the Saaz hops and as the birthplace of Wenceslaus Hajek, the most renowned Czech chronicler.

== Etymology ==
The Czech term libočan denoted a person living near the Liboc River. Libočany was a village of such people.

== Geography ==
Libočany is located next to the town of Žatec, about 20 kilometres (12 mi) west of Louny and 65 km (40 mi) northwest of Prague. It lies in an agricultural landscape in the Most Basin. The municipality is situated on the right bank of the Ohře River. The Liboc River flows through the village; its confluence with the Ohře is located just beyond the municipal border.

== History ==
The first written mention of Libočany is from 1226, when it was a property of the Premonstratensian monastery in Doksany. In 1770, Václav Karel Schroll of Schrollenberg built a new castle on the site of an older stronghold with a new church and rectory.

After the Munich Agreement in 1938, Libočany was annexed by Nazi Germany and administered as part of the Reichsgau Sudetenland. In 1945, the municipality was restored to Czechoslovakia and most of its German-speaking inhabitants were expelled.

=== Beer ===
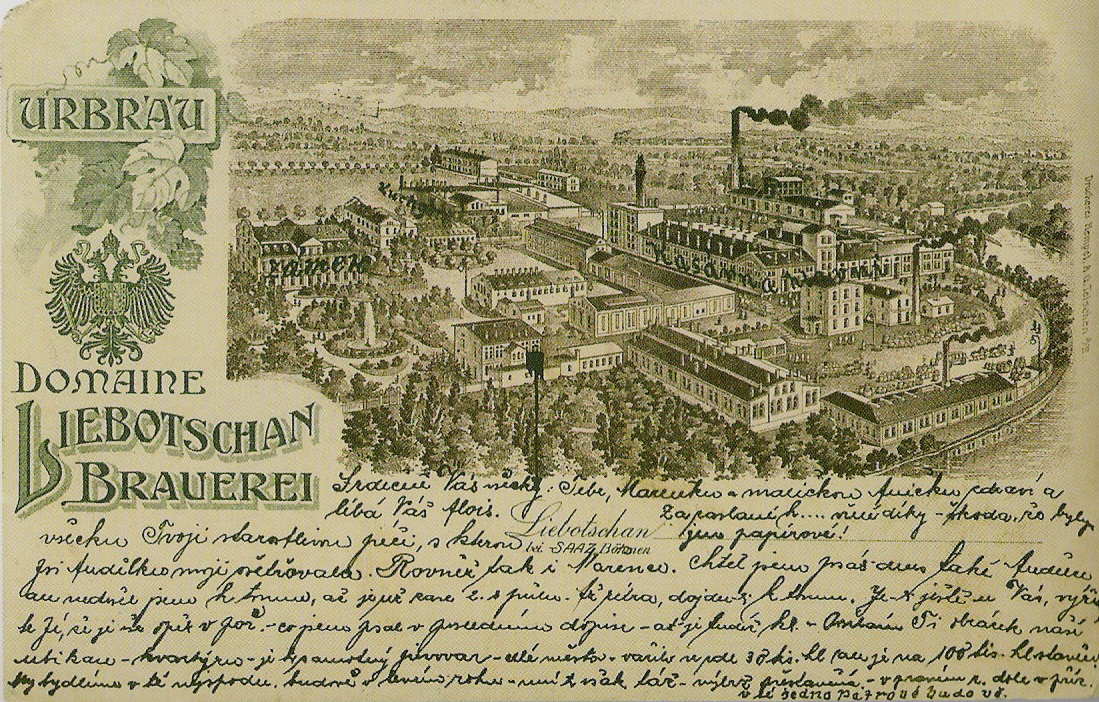
The Liebotschan Brewery in 1906

The brewery from the 19th century produced beer even for United States trade with a stock in New York. The Liebotschaner Beer was among four Bohemian beer brands exported to the United States (the others were Pilsner Urquell, Budweiser Bier, and Michelob). The latter beer, as well as Liebotschaner, was produced in the Saaz hops region. Several local American breweries have produced beer under the name of the village, or abbreviated to Lieb (e.g. Chattanooga Brewing Co. in Tennessee, Stegmaier Brewing Company, or Lion Brewery, Inc., Wilkes-Barre in Pennsylvania; Genesee's Liebotschaner Beer was pronounced best of Rochester's post repeal brews in 1932.

The production of beer in Libočany ended after World War I when the Austrian-Hungarian Empire was dissolved and Czechoslovak authorities took over. The buildings of the brewery were demolished in 1939 (during the era of German occupation of Czechoslovakia). After World War II, in socialist Czechoslovakia, it was replaced by a collective farm.

== Demographics ==
Historical population

Year	Pop.	±%
1869	498	—
1880	660	+32.5%
1890	701	+6.2%
1900	833	+18.8%
1910	806	−3.2%

Year	Pop.	±%
1921	674	−16.4%
1930	825	+22.4%
1950	528	−36.0%
1961	545	+3.2%
1970	487	−10.6%

Year	Pop.	±%
1980	625	+28.3%
1991	522	−16.5%
2001	500	−4.2%
2011	554	+10.8%
2021	497	−10.3%

Source: Censuses

== Economy ==
Libočany is located in an area known for growing the Saaz hops.

== Transport ==
There are no major roads passing through the municipality. The railway that runs through Libočany is unused.

== Sights ==
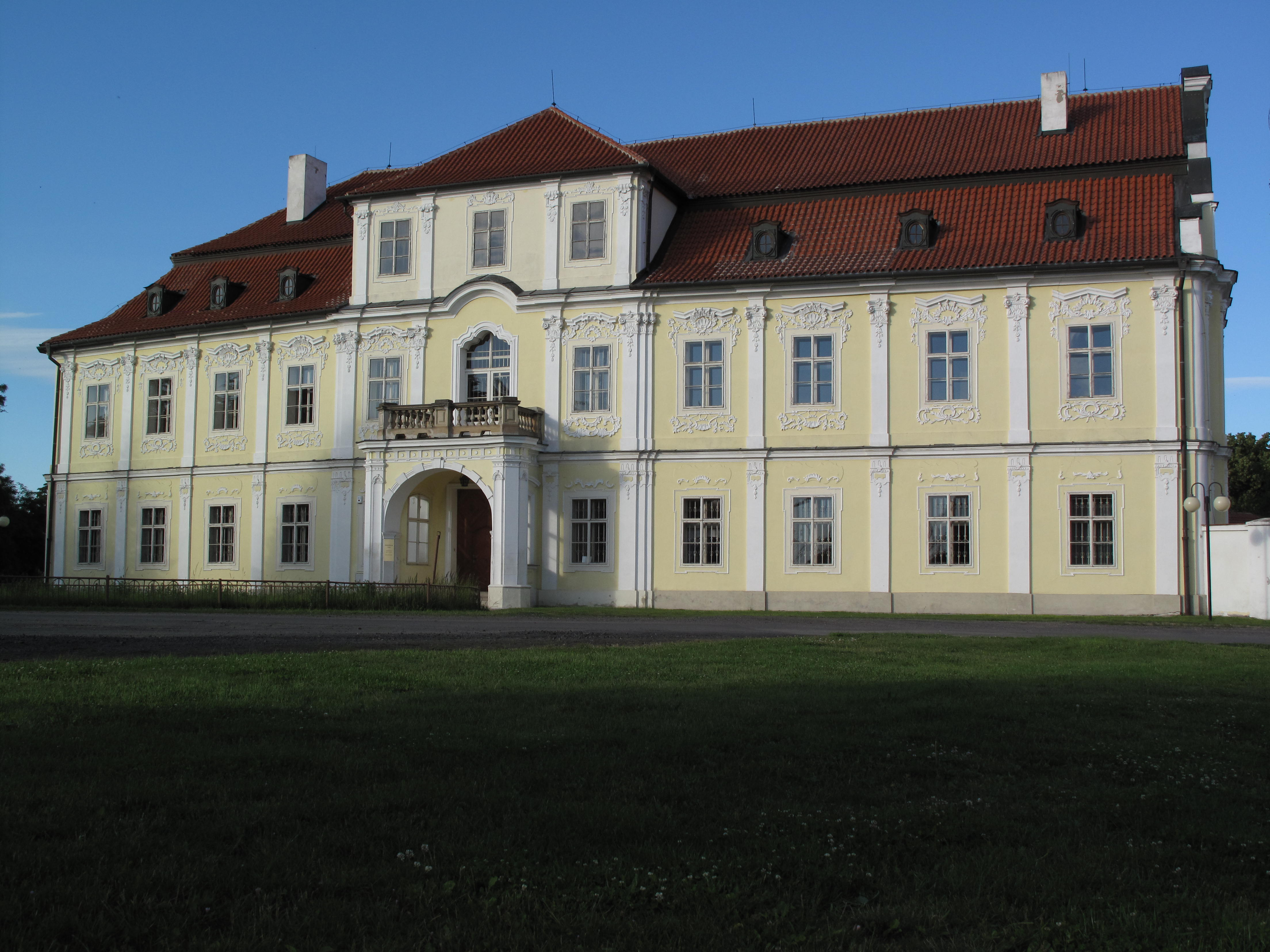
Libočany Castle

The Church of All Saints is among the main landmarks of Libočany. It was built in the Rococo style in 1749–1769.

The Libočany Castle is a Baroque building from 1770. Next to the castle is a park. The castle is privately owned and inaccessible.

== Notable people ==
- Wenceslaus Hajek (?–1553), chronicler
- Božena Viková-Kunětická (1862–1934), politician, writer and feminist; lived here in 1921–1934
