= Liboc (river) =

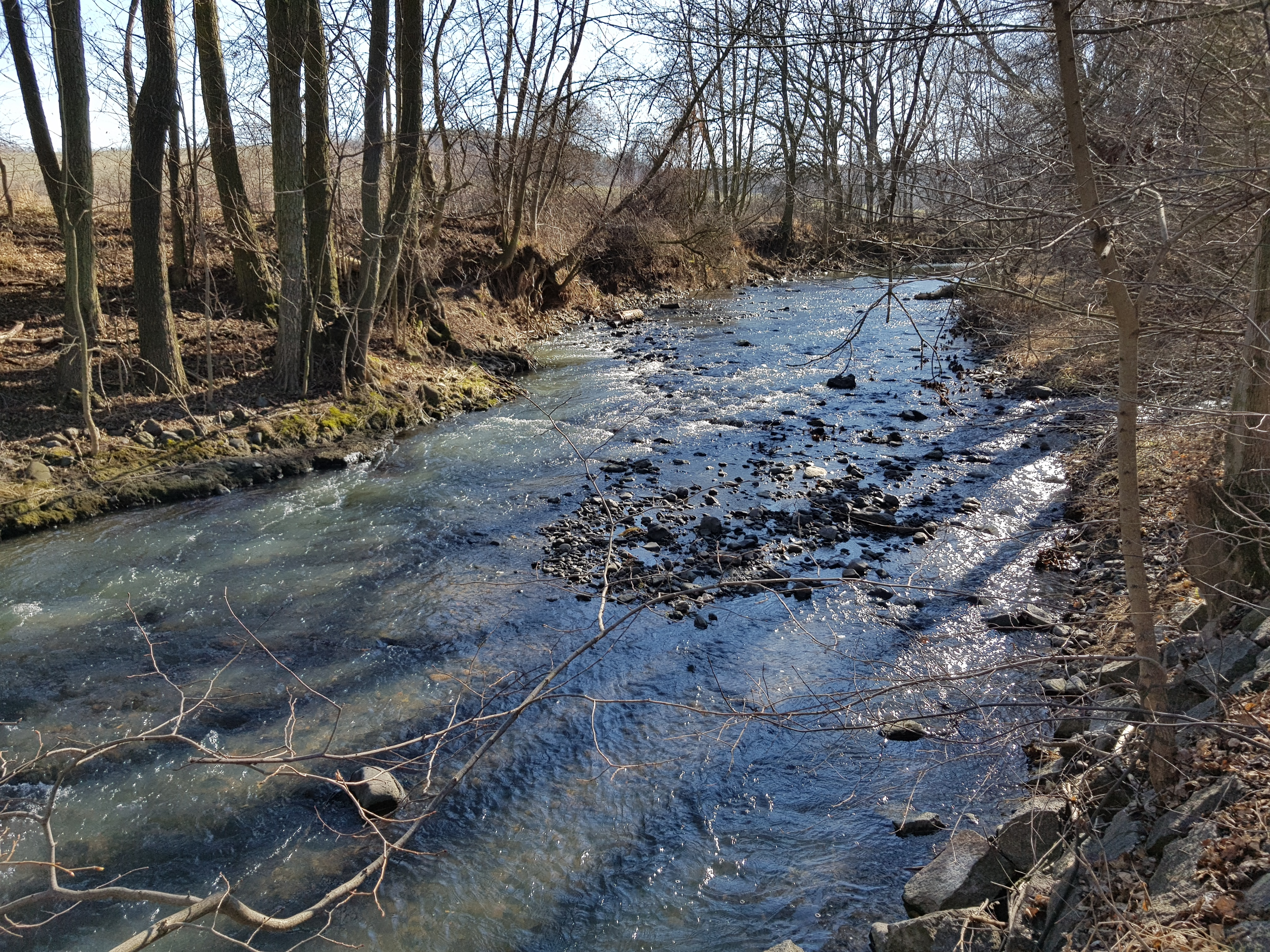
- The Liboc in Radonice

Location
- Country: Czech Republic
- Regions: Ústí nad Labem; Karlovy Vary

Physical characteristics
- Source
  - location: Hradiště Military Training Area, Doupov Mountains
  - coordinates: 50°11′15″N 13°12′37″E
  - elevation: 687 m (2,254 ft)
- Mouth
  - location: Ohře
  - coordinates: 50°19′53″N 13°31′3″E
  - elevation: 205 m (673 ft)
- Length: 46.4 km (28.8 mi)
- Basin size: 339.5 km^{2} (131.1 sq mi)
- Discharge
  - average: 1.68 m^{3}/s (59 cu ft/s) near estuary

Basin features
- Progression: Ohře→ Elbe→ North Sea

The Liboc is a river in the Czech Republic, a right tributary of the Ohře River. It flows through the Ústí nad Labem and Karlovy Vary regions. It is 46.4 km (28.8 mi) long.

== Etymology ==
The name was derived from the personal name Ľuboc.

== Characteristic ==
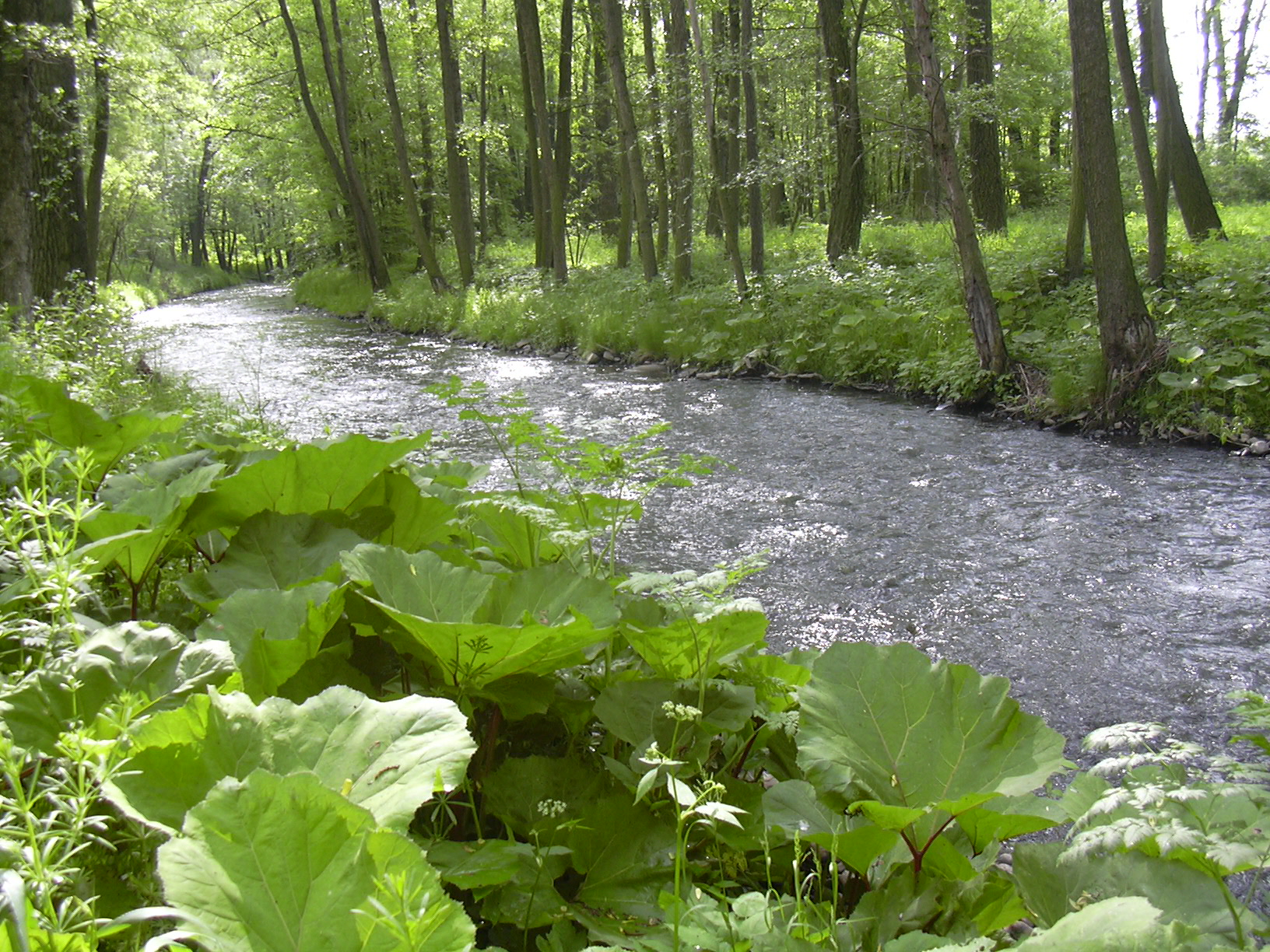
The Liboc in Pětipsy

The Liboc originates in the southern part of the Hradiště Military Training Area in the Doupov Mountains at an elevation of 687 m (2,254 ft) and flows to Žatec, where it enters the Ohře River at an elevation of 205 m (673 ft). It is 46.4 km (28.8 mi) long. Its drainage basin has an area of 339.5 km^{2} (131.1 sq mi).

The longest tributaries of the Liboc are:

Tributary	Length (km)	Side
Leska	23.6	right
Vintířovský potok	12.1	left
Dubá I	7.8	right

== Bodies of water ==
There are 198 bodies of water in the basin area. The largest of them is the fishpond Sedlec with an area of 25.6 km^{2} (9.9 sq mi), supplied by the Dubá I. Jeseňský rybník, a small fishpond near the Liboc's spring, is the only body of water built directly on the river.

== Course ==
The river flows through the Hradiště Military Training Area and through the municipal territories of Radonice, Vilémov, Pětipsy, Libědice, Nové Sedlo, Čeradice, Libočany and Žatec.

== Use ==
On the lower course of the river, the water is pumped out and used to irrigate fields with Saaz hops, typical of the town of Žatec and its surroundings.

== See also ==
- List of rivers of the Czech Republic
