= Žatec Brewery =

Brewery in Žatec, Czech Republic

- Interactive map of Žatec Brewery
- Location: Žatec, Czech Republic
- Coordinates: 50°19′55.78″N 13°32′31.13″E
- Opened: 1801
- Owner: Sedmý schod spol. s r. o.
- Website: sedmyschod.com

Žatec Brewery (Czech: Žatecký pivovar) is a brewery in Žatec in the Czech Republic. The firm continues the traditions of industrial brewing beer in the region dating back to 1801.

== Products ==
- Žatec světlé (4.1% vol.)
- Žatec Premium (4.8% vol.)
- Žatec Export (5.1% vol.)
- Žatec Dark Label (5.7% vol.)
- Baronka Premium (5.3% vol.)
- Žatec Blue Label (4.6% vol.)
- Celia – bezlepkové pivo (4.5% vol.)
- Celia Dark – tmavé bezlepkové pivo (5.7% vol.)
- Cornish Steam lager (5.1% vol.)
- Sedmý schod (5.5% vol.)
- Plavčík (3.8% vol.)

== History ==
The tradition of brewing beer in Žatec spans over 700 years. Saaz hops, a "noble" variety of hops which accounts for more than 2/3 of total 2009 hop production in the Czech Republic comes from Žatec.

- 1261 The first brewing guild with the legal right to brew beer in Žatec is formed.
- 1798 The cornerstone is laid for the first industrial brewery in Žatec.
- 1801 The first beer is brewed in Žatec's first industrial brewery.

== See also ==
- Beer in the Czech Republic
- Pilsner
