= Bedřich Bernau =

Czech writer

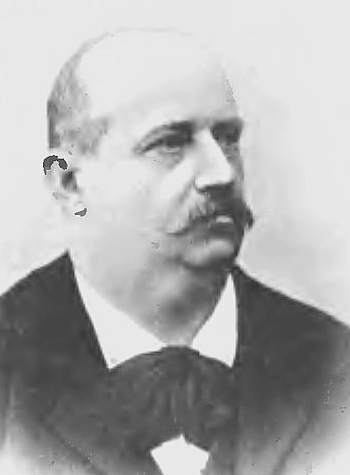
Bedřich Bernau (1899)

Bedřich (Friedrich) Bernau, born Přemysl Bačkora (22 August 1849, in Prague – 2 January 1904, in Plaňany) was a Czech amateur archaeologist, who wrote popular works on that subject and ethnography. He changed his name out of concern that publishers in Germany would be reluctant to publish books by someone with a Czech name.

== Life and work ==
He was born to the teacher and writer of books for young people, Josef Množislav Bačkora. He married Anna Žofia Franclová, while he was working as an accountant at a sugar refinery in Radonice. From 1876 to 1880, they had three children. In 1881, they moved to Štětí, where they lived for less than a year, then went to Plaňany, where he once again worked for a sugar refinery; this time as a manager.

Although he spent much of his life as an accountant, for several types of businesses, his spare time was devoted to the study of culture, history, and archaeology. He collaborated with Otto's Encyclopedia, and was an active member of the National Museum Society, as well as several other organizations devoted to history. In 1895, he became an executive with the Archaeological Commission at the Czech Academy of Sciences and Arts.

He was known for his ethnographic and historical studies of Bohemia, which he wrote in Czech and German. He was a contributor to the journal, Památky archeologické (archaeological monuments) and to an extensive guidebook, Čechy (Bohemia), by Jan Otto, with illustrations by Karel Liebscher.

His main work was the Album der Burgen und Schlösser im Königreiche Böhmen (album of castles and palaces in the Kingdom of Bohemia, 2 vols.), issued from 1879 to 1883, with illustrations by Baltazar Kutina (1853-1923). It was intended to be a longer series, but was cancelled by the publisher, Druck und Verlag Brüder Butter, of Saaz. It has been suggested that they were looking for something critical of the Czechs, and thought the work was too objective. One of his last major works, Plaňany s okolím (Plaňany and its surroundings, 1896), was dedicated to the town where he spent the last years of his life.
