= Selbbach =

River in Germany

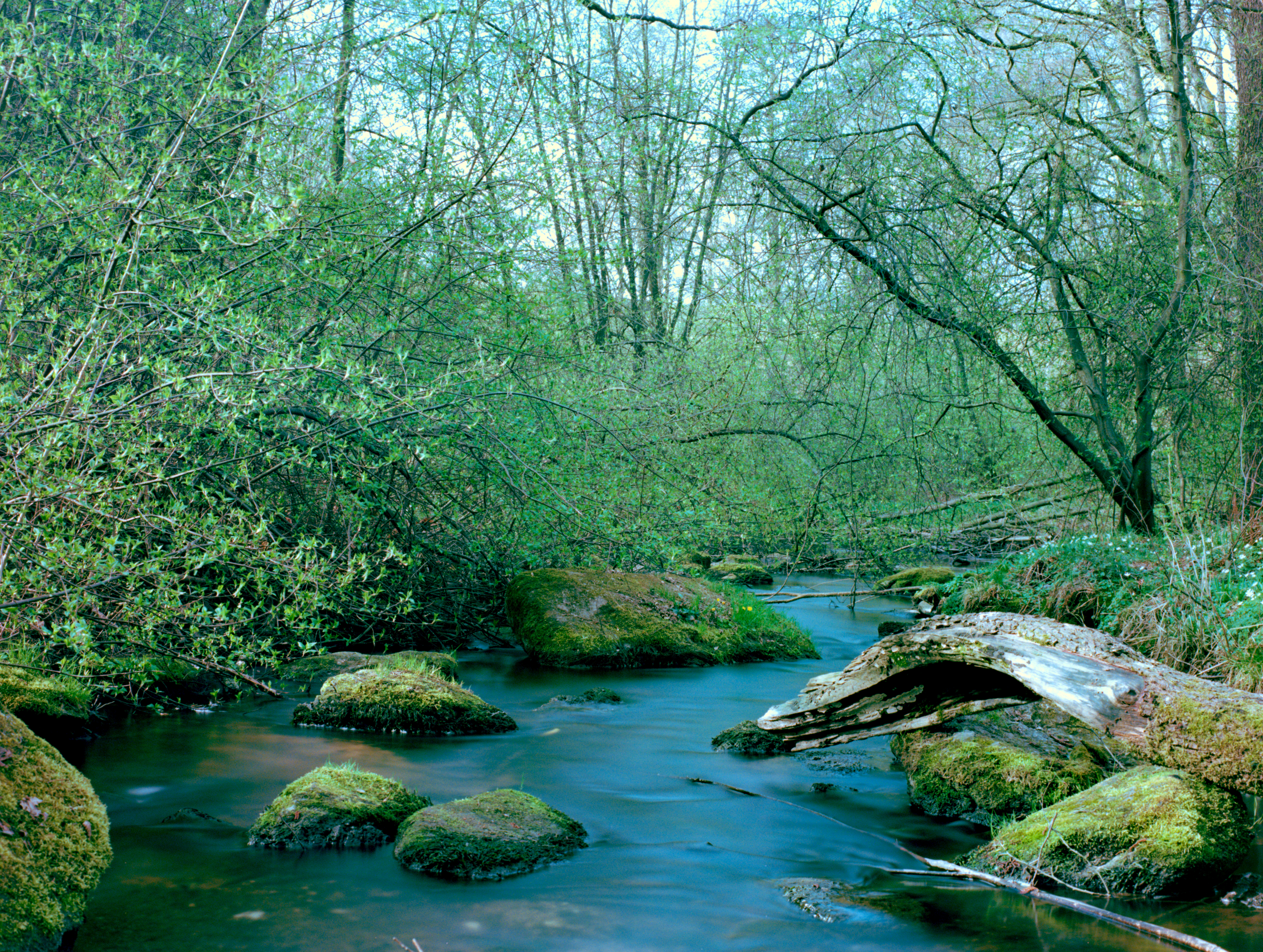
- The selb in the Pfaffenleithe, Selb

Location
- Countries: Czech Republic; Germany
- Region (CZ): Karlovy Vary
- State (DE): Bavaria

Physical characteristics
- Mouth
  - location: Ohře
  - coordinates: 50.1381°N 12.0910°E
- Length: 18.0 km (11.2 mi)

Basin features
- Progression: Ohře→ Elbe→ North Sea

Selbbach (also: Selb, Czech: Račí potok) is a river of the Karlovy Vary Region, Czech Republic and Bavaria, Germany. Its source is west of the town Aš. It flows into the Ohře (Eger) near Selb.

== See also ==
- List of rivers of Bavaria
