= Adolf Strauss =

Adolf Strauss may refer to:

- Adolf Strauss (composer) (1902–1944), Czech pianist, composer and kapellmeister
- Adolf Strauss (general) (1879–1973), German military general
