= Radonice (Chomutov District) =

- Municipality
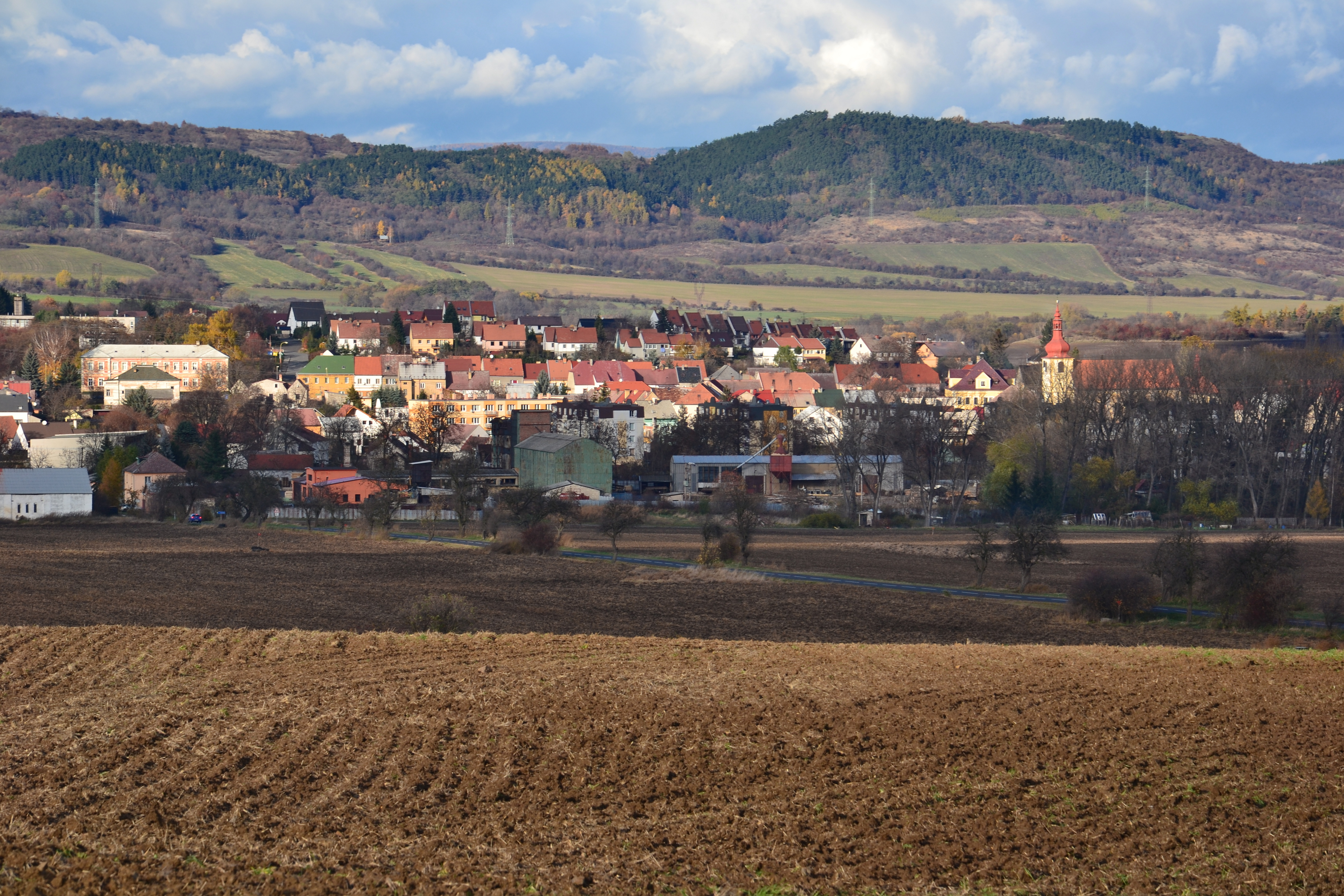
- Radonice seen from the south

- Location in the Czech Republic
- Coordinates: 50°17′46″N 13°17′4″E
- Country: Czech Republic
- Region: Ústí nad Labem
- District: Chomutov
- First mentioned: 1196

Area
  - Total: 31.62 km^{2} (12.21 sq mi)
- Elevation: 322 m (1,056 ft)

Population (2026-01-01)
  - Total: 1,143
  - Density: 36.15/km^{2} (93.62/sq mi)
- Time zone: UTC+1 (CET)
  - Summer (DST): UTC+2 (CEST)
- Postal code: 431 55
- Website: www.obec-radonice.cz

Radonice (Czech pronunciation: [ˈradoɲɪtsɛ]; German: Radonitz) is a municipality and village in Chomutov District in the Ústí nad Labem Region of the Czech Republic. It has about 1,100 inhabitants.

== Administrative division ==
Radonice consists of 12 municipal parts (in brackets population according to the 2021 census):

- Radonice (868)
- Háj (3)
- Kadaňský Rohozec (48)
- Kojetín (37)
- Miřetice u Vintířova (29)
- Obrovice (5)
- Radechov (34)
- Sedlec u Radonic (2)
- Vintířov (106)
- Vlkaň (7)
- Vojnín (5)
- Ždov (19)

== Etymology ==
The name is derived from a personal name Radoň, meaning "the village of Radoň's people".

== Geography ==
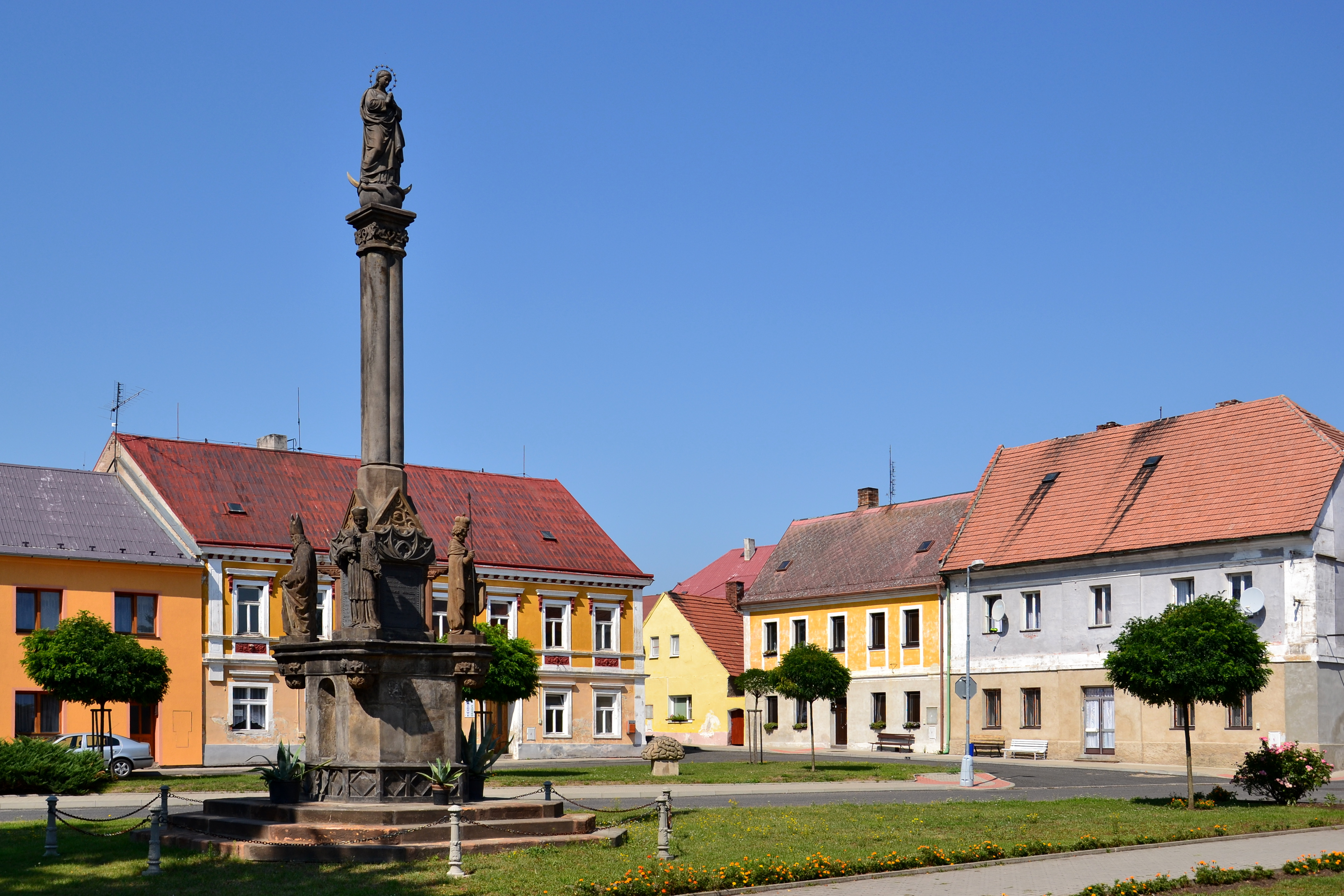
Centre of Radonice

Radonice is located about 19 kilometres (12 mi) southwest of Chomutov and 29 km (18 mi) east of Karlovy Vary. The central part of the municipal territory with the Radonice village lies in a tip of the Most Basin, but the northern and southern parts lie in the Doupov Mountains. The highest point is at 578 m (1,896 ft) above sea level. The Liboc River flows through the municipality.

== History ==
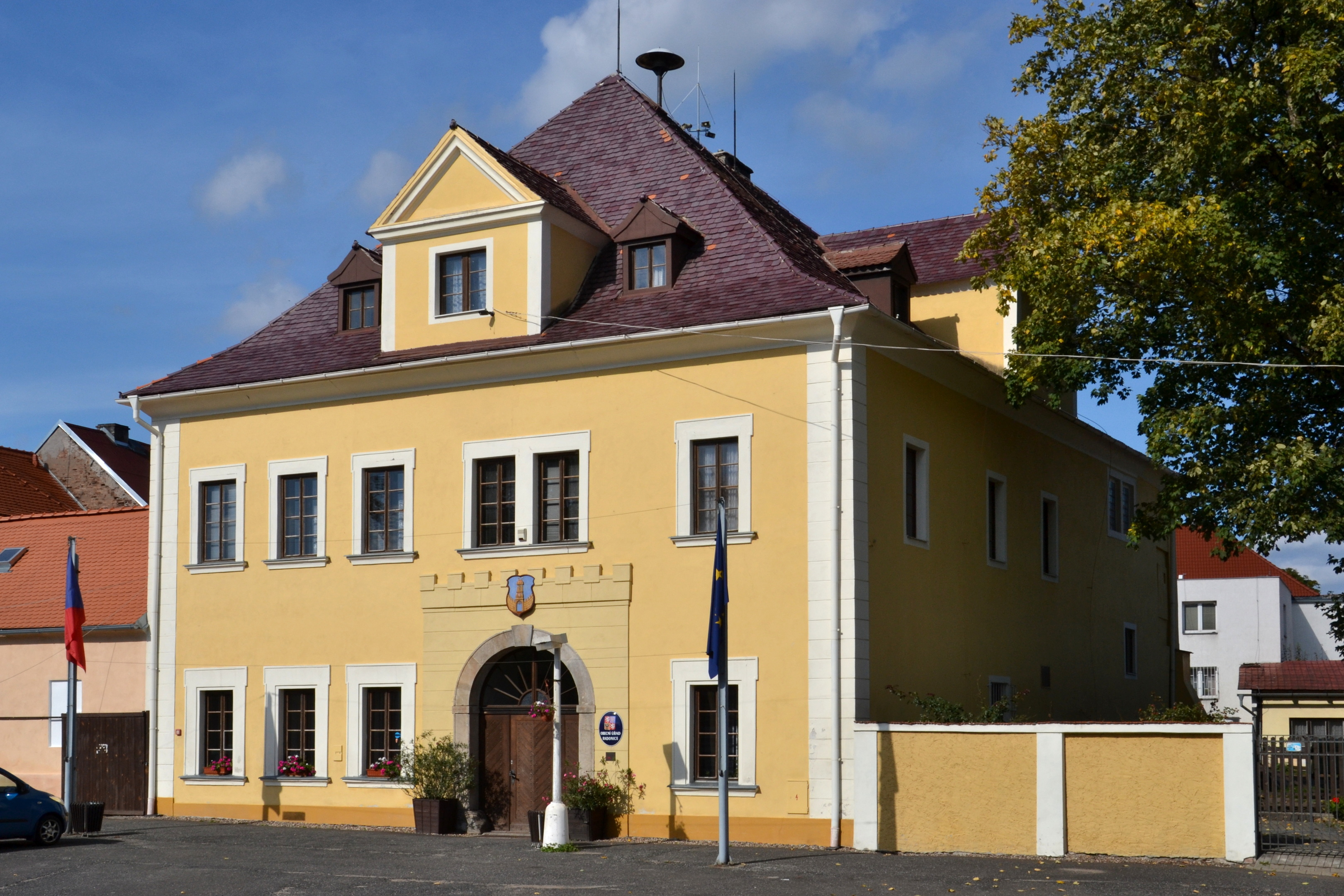
Municipal office, formerly a castle

The first written mention of Radonice is from 1196, when monks came from Waldsassen Abbey at the invitation of Milhost of Mašťov. Ojíř of Radonice (written in Latin as Hogir de Radonitz) signed his donating document as a witness.

Mikuláš and Jan Hasištejnský of Lobkowicz were next holders. Fates of Radonice were connected with Vintířov with a knight fortress, which was changed to a castle for a noble family. After 1508, Radonice experienced the largest bloom. Opl of Fictum bought the Radonice estate and Vintířov from Albrecht of Kolowrat. It was his merit that Radonice was raised to a town by King Vladislaus II in 1514. He conferred it a privilege of brewing beer, selling salt, markets arranging and the one-mile-law privilege.

In 1532, Albert Schlick bought the market town Radonice and Vintířov. The mastership of Schlicks lasted for three quarters of a century and it was a time of development. The town was enclosed by a wall and it had four gates. It had a brewery, a malt-house, two mills, a bath, a new pub and a town hospital.

In 1622, Ferdinand of Nagarol became a lord of the market town. His wife forbade to receive Jews in the market town in 1628. In 1662, King Leopold I ratified the privilege of the one-mile-law for a salt and a corn. In 1664, the Losynthal family bought Radonice. The first mention of the local school appeared in 1664. A new church was built on a place of the old one in 1702.

In 1842, stables and a riding school were destroyed by fire. In 1871 a sugar refinery grew up at the outskirts. In 1889, a new school was built in Doupovská street. From 1841, a regular connecting by a post coach started. First post office was opened in 1872. In 1884, a railway was built. An electrification of the community was performed in 1910.

From the first half of 19th century, coal mining developed. The best known coal mine was Františka and the exploitation ended on the eve of World War II. Soon after the beginning of World War II prisoners went to Radonice. Thirty-five men from France were accommodated in Radonice. They worked mainly in the shafts and in local farms. The German-speaking population was expelled after World War II.

In 1952, the farmers' cooperation started, which stood on dried swamp. After the Velvet Revolution of 1989, the population is slowly increasing again.

== Demographics ==
Historical population

Year	Pop.	±%
1869	2,778	—
1880	3,233	+16.4%
1890	3,173	−1.9%
1900	2,939	−7.4%
1910	2,832	−3.6%

Year	Pop.	±%
1921	2,985	+5.4%
1930	2,785	−6.7%
1950	1,525	−45.2%
1961	1,282	−15.9%
1970	1,131	−11.8%

Year	Pop.	±%
1980	1,278	+13.0%
1991	1,110	−13.1%
2001	1,153	+3.9%
2011	1,151	−0.2%
2021	1,163	+1.0%

Source: Censuses

== Transport ==
Radonice is the terminus of a railway line heading from Kadaň. The municipality is served by three train stations and stops: Radonice u Kadaně, Ždov and Kadaňský Rohozec. However, trains run on it only on weekends and holidays during the period April–October.

== Sights ==
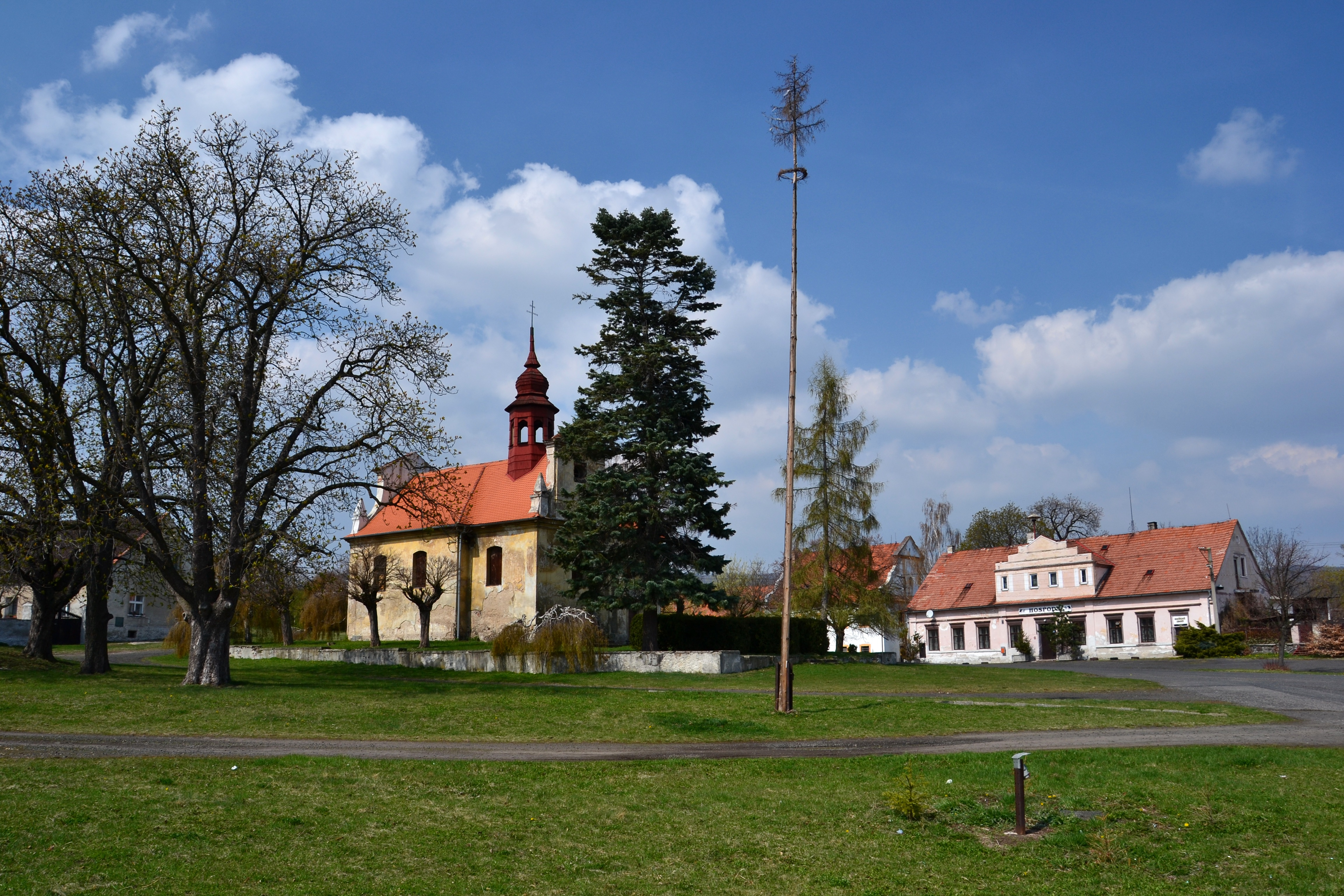
Centre of Vintířov with the Church of Saint Margaret the Virgin

The Church of the Nativity of the Virgin Mary was built in the Baroque style in 1699–1702, when it replaced an old Gothic church.

The former Radonice Castle is a Baroque building from 1725. Today it houses the municipal office.

The Church of Saint Margaret the Virgin in Vintířov was founded in the mid-18th century. In the mid-18th century, it was rebuilt into its present Baroque form.

The Vintířov Castle is formed by two buildings, so-called Starý zámek ('old castle') and Nový zámek ('new castle'). Starý zámek was built in 1544–1556 for Count Albrecht Schlick. Nový zámek dates from 1717. In 1817–1823, the Starý zámek was reconstructed and Nový zámek was rebuilt in the Neoclassical style. The last reconstruction was in the neo-Gothic style and took place in 1868. Today the castle complex is unused and inaccessible to the public.

== Notable people ==
- Ignaz Walter (1755–1822), opera singer and composer
- Bedřich Bernau (1849–1904), archaeologist and ethnographist, worked here
