= Wenceslaus Hajek =

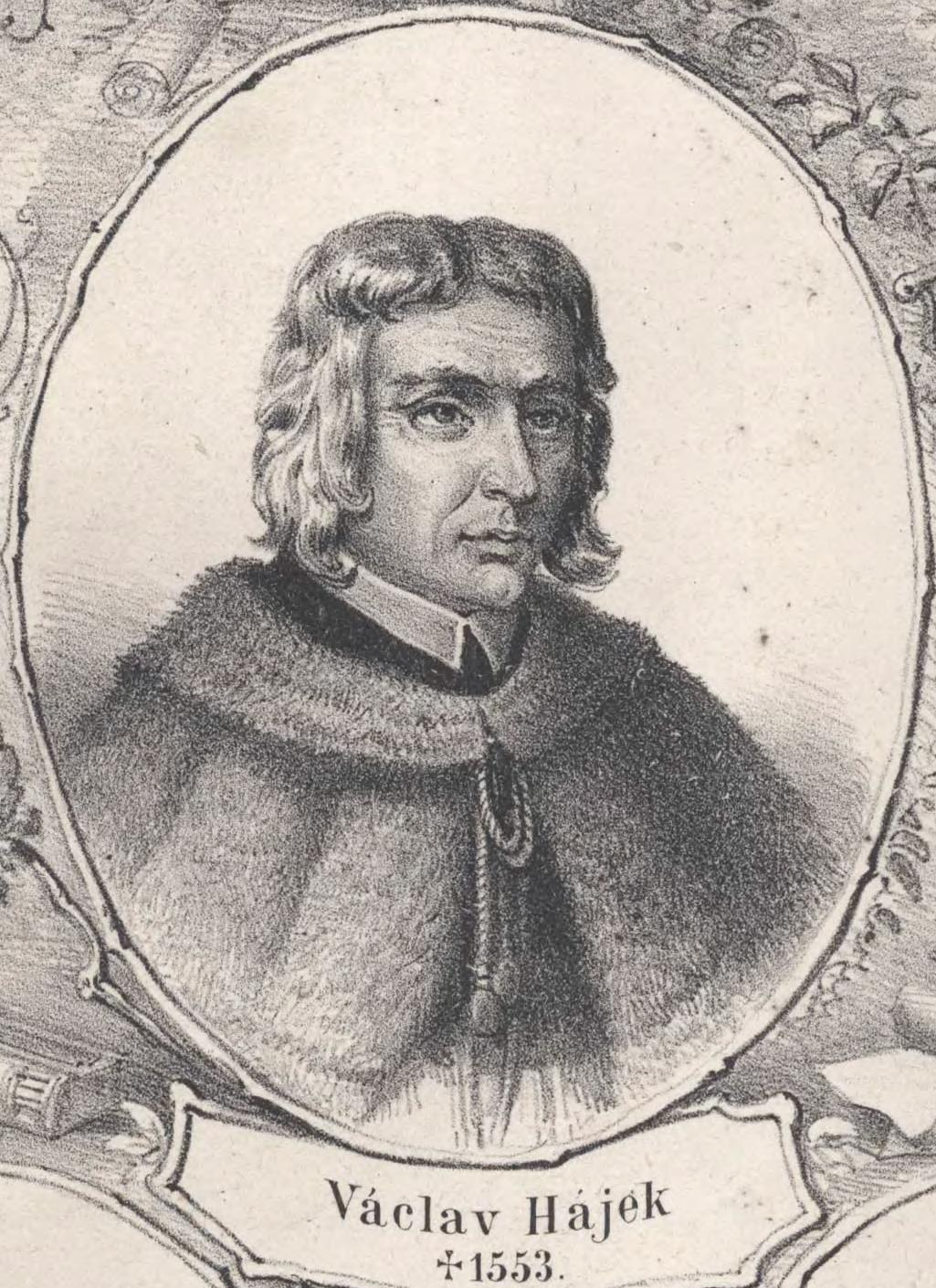
Ideal portrait (about 1861)

Wenceslaus Hájek of Libočany (Czech: Václav Hájek z Libočan, German: Wenzeslaus Hagek von Libotschan, Latin: Wenceslaus Hagecius, Wenceslaus Hagek a Liboczan; late 15th century – 18 March 1553) was a Bohemian chronicler. He was author of famous Bohemian Chronicle (1541), also called the Hájek's Chronicle. This work served as the main source of Czech historical and national consciousness until the end of the 18th century, when numerous errors and fabrications contained in it were recognized.

== Life ==
A scion of a noble family based in Libočany near Žatec, western Bohemia, Hajek was ordained priest of the Kostelec parish near Budyně nad Ohří in 1520. One year later, he became a chaplain in Zlonice. Hajek initially was a member of the Bohemian Unity of the Brethren but later converted to Catholicism.

In 1524 he served as a preacher at the St. Thomas' Church in Prague quarter Malá Strana (Lesser Town); from 1527 as a dean of Karlštejn Castle and a priest in Tetín. In May 1533, he was appointed royal administrator of the Vyšehrad Chapter. Hájek reached the peak of ecclesiastical career when he became provost of Stará Boleslav Chapter, however, he fell from grace shortly afterwards and retired to Prague.

== Works ==
His famous Bohemian Chronicle (Kronika česká in original), written in old humanistic Czech, cover the history of the Czech lands from the legendary early medieval rulers Lech, Czech, and Rus up to the coronation of King Ferdinand I in 1526. It was translated into German by Johann Sandel (1596), and later extensively studied by Johann Wolfgang von Goethe (1749–1832). Long considered one of the best sources of Czech history, modern criticism has found it to be quite inaccurate, although still useful for information about Czech literature traditions of the time.
