= Ignaz Walter =

Austrian opera singer

Johann Ignaz Walter (31 August 1755 – 22 February 1822) was an operatic tenor, opera director and composer in Austria and Germany.

== Life ==
Walter was born in 1755 in Radonice (now in the Czech Republic). He trained in singing when he was young, then from 1773 studied composition in Vienna with Josef Starzer. His first stage appearance is thought to be in Vienna. During the 1780s he appeared as principal tenor in Prague, then in Riga. In 1786 he married Julia Roberts, an opera singer, and they afterwards appeared together, including in Mainz at the court theatre of the Elector.

In 1793 he joined the opera company of Gustav Friedrich Wilhelm Großmann, with whom he appeared in Kassel, Pyrmont, Bremen, Hanover and other cities. From 1795 he was entrusted as artistic director, and he took over the management of the company after Großmann's death in 1796; the company subsequently performed in Bremen, Hanover and elsewhere.

From 1804 Walter was the theatre director in Regensburg. He died there in 1822.

== Works ==
Walter composed several operas, operettas and Singspiele, and other vocal works, including the opera Doctor Faust (1797).
