= Božena Viková-Kunětická =

Czech politician (1862–1934)

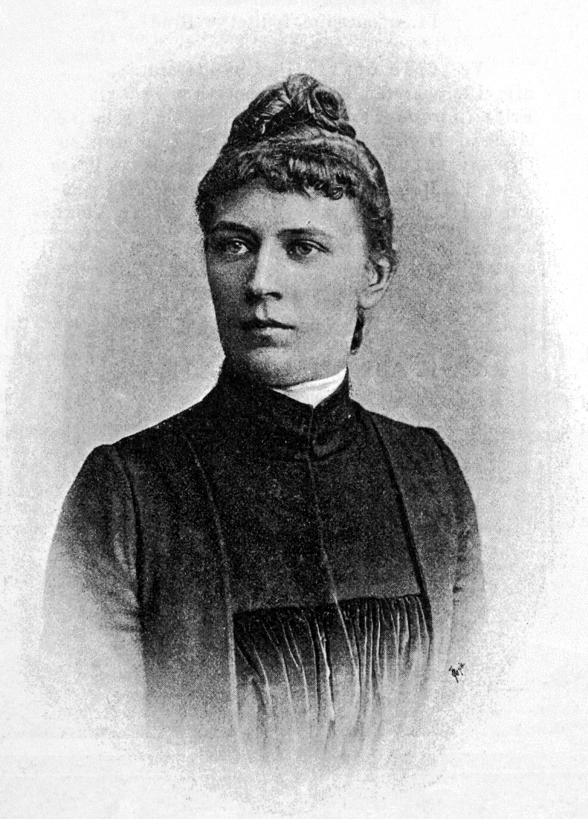
- Born: Božena Novotná; July 30, 1862; Pardubice, Bohemia, Austrian Empire
- Died: March 18, 1934 (aged 71); Libočany, Czechoslovakia
- Occupations: Politician, writer, feminist
- Political party: National Party of Free Thought / Czech National Social Party
- Movement: Czech feminism

Božena Viková-Kunětická (30 July 1862 – 18 March 1934) was a Czech nationalist politician, writer and feminist.

== Biography ==
Božena Viková-Kunětická was born Božena Novotná on 30 July 1862 in Pardubice, Bohemia, Austrian Empire (today the Czech Republic). She was the first female member of the Bohemian diet. From 1921, she lived in Libočany, where she died in 1934. A novelist, her work is stored at the Literary Archive of the Museum of Czech Literature.

== Selected works ==
- Povídky (1887)
- Drobné povídky (1888)
- Čtyři povídky (1890)
- Po svatbě (1892)
- Nové povídky (1892)
- Vdova po chirurgovi (1893)
- Idylky (1894)
- Silhouetty mužů (1899)
- Staří mládenci a jiné povídky (1901)
- Macecha a jiné črty (1902)
- Justyna Holdanová (1892)
- Minulost (1895)
- Medřická (1897)
- Vzpoura (1901)
- Pán (1905)

== See also ==
- List of the first female holders of political offices in Europe
