= Wilhelm Würfel =

Czech conductor, composer and pianist (1790–1832)

Wilhelm Würfel, aka Wenzel Würfel (Czech: Václav Vilém Würfel, Polish: Wilhelm Wacław Würfel; May 6, 1790 - March 23, 1832) was a Czech composer, pianist and conductor.

== Life ==
He was born in 1790 in Plaňany near Kolín in central Bohemia. His father was a schoolteacher. He studied piano with his mother. In 1807 he went to Prague where he studied with Václav Jan Tomášek. In 1815 he went to Warsaw where he was appointed a professor at the Warsaw Conservatory. He gave piano performances in Poland, Bohemia, Germany and Russia. In 1824 he returned to Prague and conducted his opera Rübezahl. From 1826 he stayed as a conductor in Vienna. He had a meeting with Beethoven just before he died in 1827.

Wurfel died in Vienna, aged 41.

His most famous pupil is said to be the Polish-French romantic composer Frédéric Chopin, who it is claimed studied with him at the Warsaw High School of Music between 1823-26. However, although Würfel was a friend of the Chopin family and may have given Chopin some guidance, he returned to his native Prague in 1824 and did not encounter Chopin thereafter.

According to Jonathan Bellman in his book Chopin's Polish Ballade (45), one of Wurfel's programmatic pieces that Chopin must have known is the Grande fantaisie lugubre au souvenir des trois héros Prince Joseph Poniatowski, Kościuszko, et Dąbrowski, composé et dediée à la nation polonaise (Warsaw: Fuss, 1818). The composition exemplifies the flourishing Polish genre of fantasias that used narrative elements and quotations to express Polish nationalism. Wurfel's section headings are as follows:

- Fateful night
- The sounds of the bells of the three towers [These are the three towers of Wawel Cathedral in Kraków, Poland, where the three heroes are buried]
- Gloomy presentiments
- Death proclaims the end of the three heroes
- Terror
- Acute suffering of the nation
- Memory of their self-sacrifice for the country
- They are no more
- The sound of the funeral bell from the cathedral announces the funeral ceremony
- Funeral March
- Grateful sentiments of the nation

According to Halina Goldberg in her book Music in Chopin's Warsaw (93), "The piece also speaks to the audiences through the evocation of familiar national tunes associated with the three heroes: in the section marked 'Souvenir de leur dévoument pour la patrie,' we hear successively Prince Poniatowski's Favorite March, the Trio of Kościuszko's Polonaise "And When You Depart, Fare Well" (A kiedy odjeżdżasz bywaj że zdrów), and the Dąbrowski Mazurka, (aka the Polish National Anthem)."

== Works ==
Operas: Rübezahl (Prague, October 7, 1824, Vienna, March, 1825) and Der Rothmantel

Piano works: Piano Concerto op. 28 (publ. Peters, Leipzig) Rondeau Brillant op. 20, op. 24 (publ. Peters, Leipzig), op. 25, and op. 30 (publ. Tobi Haslinger, Wien) Variations op. 16, op. 17, op. 19, and op. 29 Polonaises op. 21, op. 27 (publ. Peters, Leipzig)

== Sources ==
- Bellman, Jonathan (2010). Chopin's Polish Ballade: Op. 38 as Narrative of National Martyrdom. Oxford: Oxford University Press.
- Goldberg, Halina (2008). Music in Chopin's Warsaw. Oxford: Oxford University Press.
- Zamoyski, Adam (2010). Chopin: Prince of the Romantics. London: HarperCollins. ISBN 978-0-00-735182-4
