= Plaňany =

- Market town
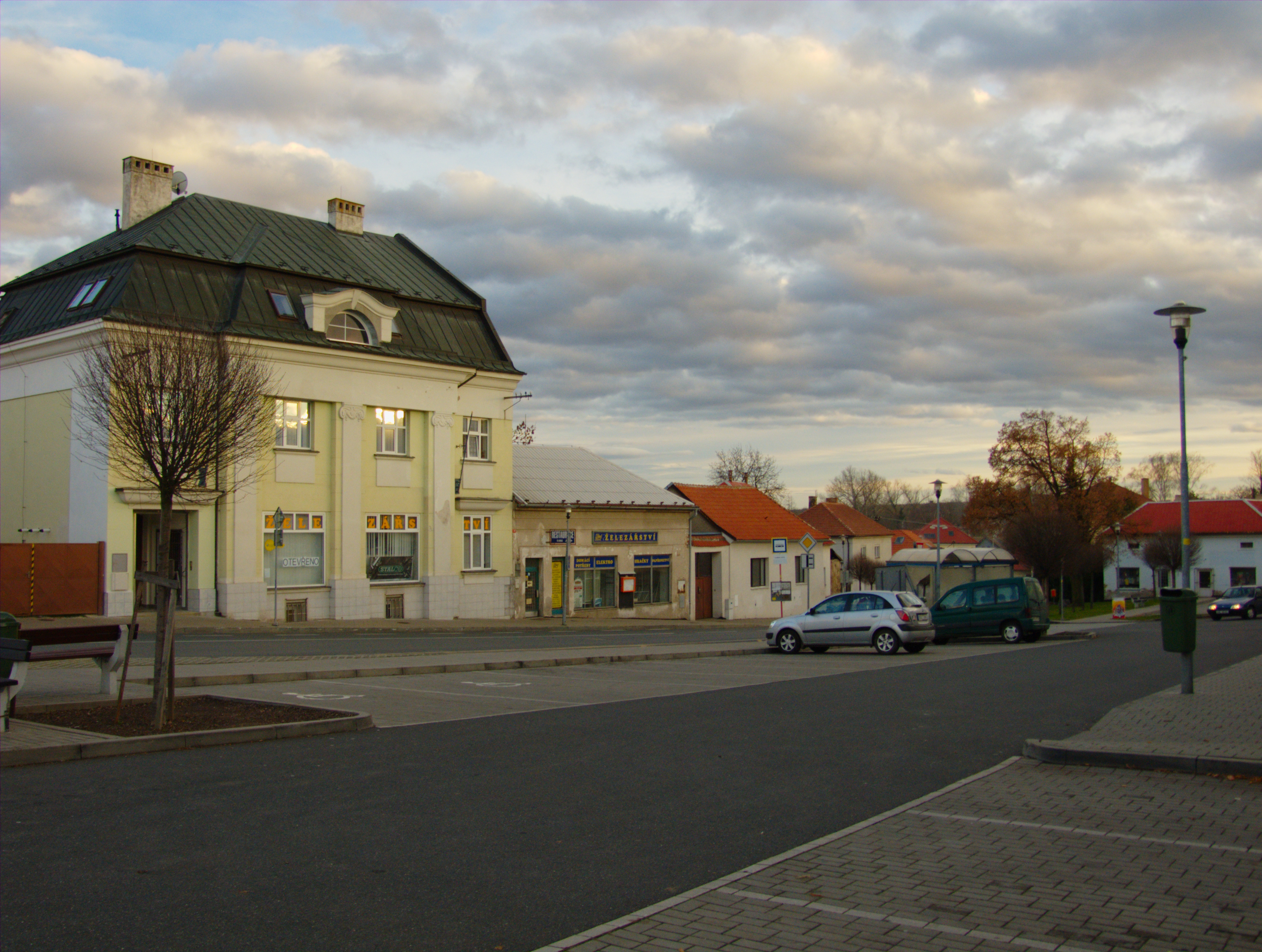
- Centre of Plaňany

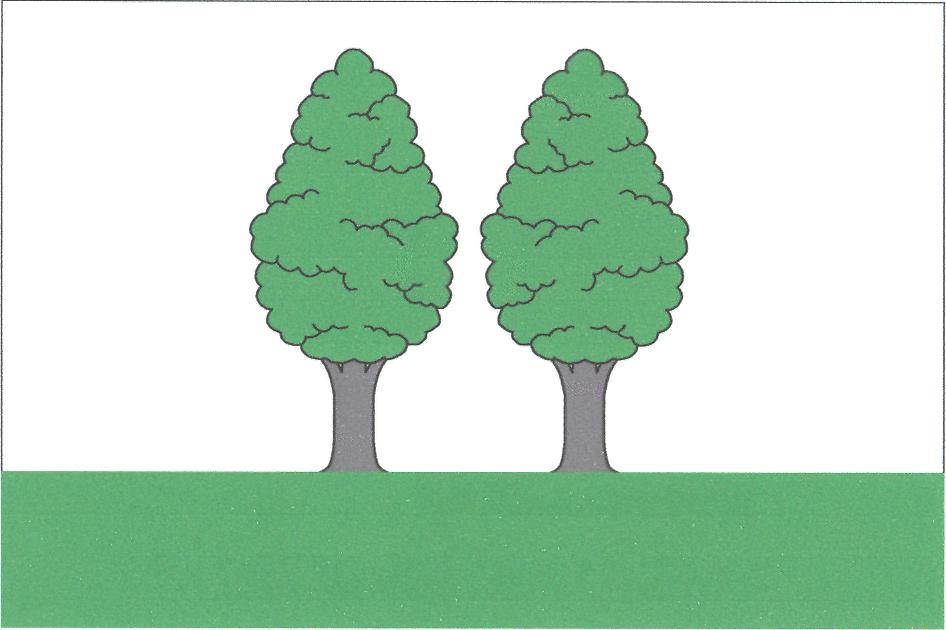
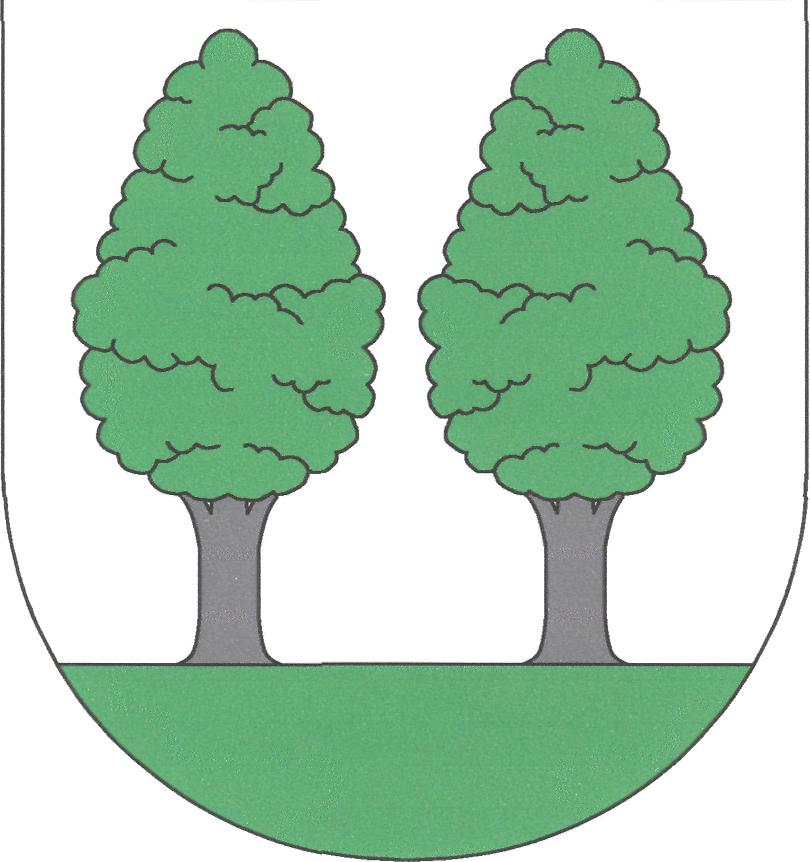
- Flag Coat of arms

- Location in the Czech Republic
- Coordinates: 50°3′0″N 15°1′46″E
- Country: Czech Republic
- Region: Central Bohemian
- District: Kolín
- First mentioned: 1222

Area
  - Total: 13.85 km^{2} (5.35 sq mi)
- Elevation: 219 m (719 ft)

Population (2026-01-01)
  - Total: 1,931
  - Density: 139.4/km^{2} (361.1/sq mi)
- Time zone: UTC+1 (CET)
  - Summer (DST): UTC+2 (CEST)
- Postal codes: 280 02, 281 04
- Website: www.planany.eu

Plaňany (Czech pronunciation: [ˈplaɲanɪ]; German: Planian) is a market town in Kolín District in the Central Bohemian Region of the Czech Republic. It has about 1,900 inhabitants.

== Administrative division ==
Plaňany consists of four municipal parts (in brackets population according to the 2021 census):

- Plaňany (1,613)
- Blinka (60)
- Hradenín (90)
- Poboří (142)

== Etymology ==
The name is derived either from the Czech word plaňané (meaning "people living on a plain") or from Plaňané ("people who came from Planá").

== Geography ==
Plaňany is located about 12 kilometres (7 mi) west of Kolín and 35 km (22 mi) east of Prague. It lies in a flat agricultural landscape of the Central Elbe Table. The highest point is the hill Mukařov at 331 m (1,086 ft) above sea level. The market town is situated on the right bank of the Výrovka River.

== History ==
The first written mention of Plaňany is from 1222, under its old name Plaňasy. In 1421 and 1424, the village was burned down by the Hussites, then it was looted by the army of King George of Poděbrady in 1448. Probably in 1572, during the rule of the Mírek of Solopysky family, the village was promoted to a market town.

== Demographics ==
Historical population

Year	Pop.	±%
1869	1,863	—
1880	2,098	+12.6%
1890	2,345	+11.8%
1900	2,339	−0.3%
1910	2,273	−2.8%

Year	Pop.	±%
1921	2,198	−3.3%
1930	2,176	−1.0%
1950	1,712	−21.3%
1961	1,687	−1.5%
1970	1,571	−6.9%

Year	Pop.	±%
1980	1,410	−10.2%
1991	1,384	−1.8%
2001	1,411	+2.0%
2011	1,697	+20.3%
2021	1,905	+12.3%

Source: Censuses

== Transport ==
The I/12 road from Prague to Kolín runs through the municipal territory.

Plaňany is located on the railway line of local importance from Kouřim to Pečky. The market town is served by two train stops: Plaňany and Plaňany zastávka.

== Sights ==
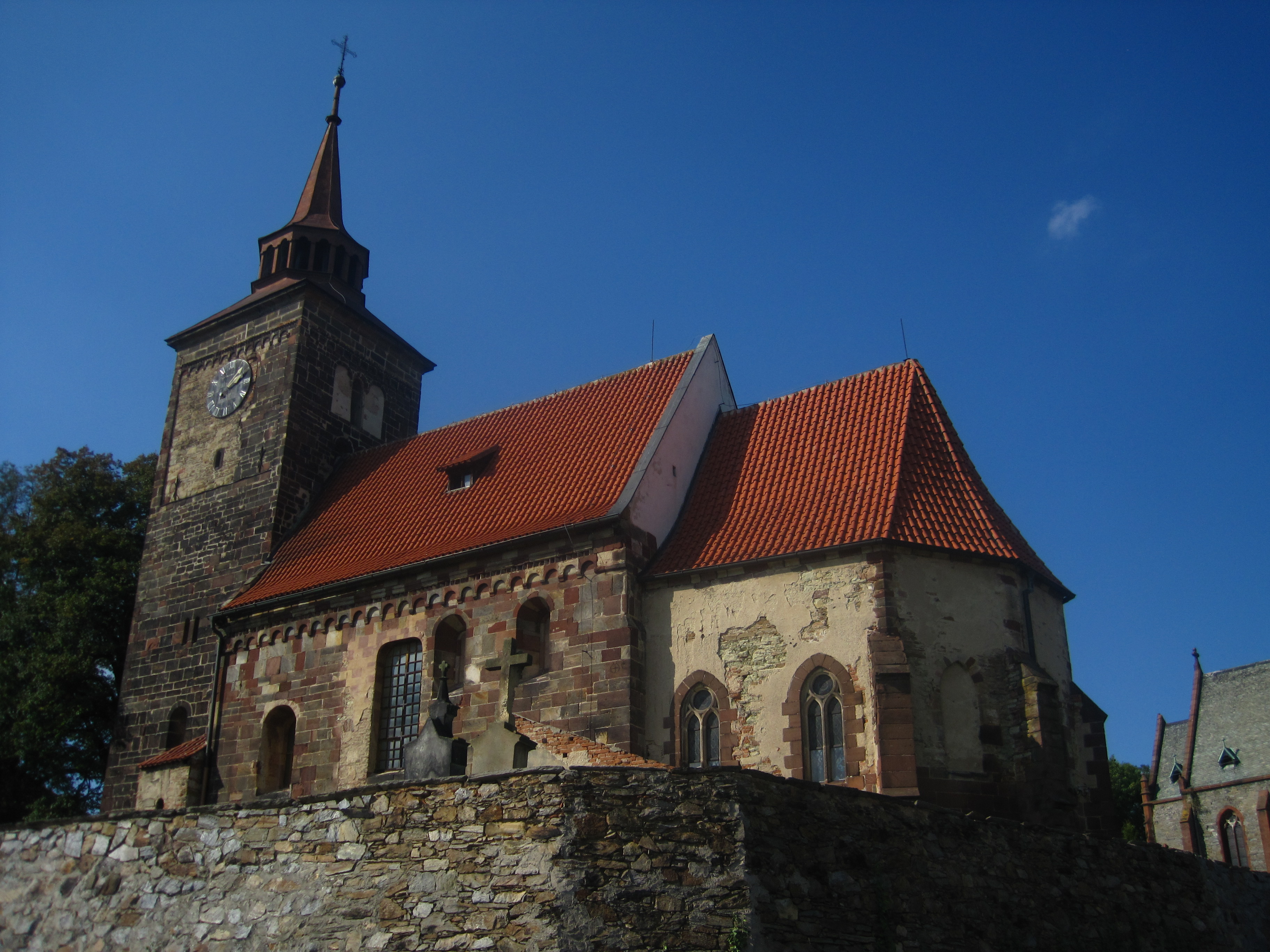
Church of the Annunciation of the Virgin Mary

The main landmark of Plaňany is the Church of the Annunciation of the Virgin Mary. It is a Romanesque cemetery church from the mid-12th century with a Gothic extension from the 14th century. Next to the church is a free-standing half-timbered belfry. Near this church are also the neo-Gothic Church of the Nativity of St. John the Baptist from 1901 and a Baroque rectory, which are not cultural monuments.

A notable building is the local Baroque granary. It was originally a Renaissance fortress built in 1530–1539, but it was rebuilt into a granary in the 1740s. It served as a granary until the mid-20th century.

== Notable people ==
- Wilhelm Würfel (1790–1832), composer
- Bedřich Bernau (1849–1904), archaeologist and ethnographer; lived and died here
- Josef Nádvorník (1906–1977), lichenologist
