= Adolf Strauss (composer) =

Czech composer and musician

Adolf Strauss (16 August 1902 – 28 September 1944) was a Czech pianist, violinist, accordion and harmonica player, composer and kapellmeister.

== Biography ==
Strauss was born to Jewish parents, Josef and Rosa Strauss, in Žatec, a historic town in Louny District, Ústí nad Labem Region, in the Czech Republic (at the time still part of the Austrian Empire). He was killed on 28 September 1944 in Auschwitz concentration camp, Poland, under the Nazi regime.

He studied music at the Prague Conservatory, earning his living by playing music in Prague's cafes. Due to an antisemitic incident in Prague, he eventually continued his studies at the conservatory in Leipzig, Germany. There, he became the conductor at the Leipzig Kristallpalast. In Leipzig, he also published his first composition, "Karawanen Fox Trott" (Caravan Fox Trot), which was published by the Fritz Brandt Musikverlag Leipzig in 1923, and which was often played in the radio at the time. When the Nazis gained in power in Germany and the musicians refused to play under a Jewish conductor, Adolf and his wife Maria, herself a musician from Bohemia (singer, violinist and pianist) decided to go back to Czechoslovakia. They opened a shoe shop in the city of Cheb, Czech Republic. There, Maria became the manager of the shop, whereas Adolf continued to compose in a small back room of the shop. It was there, where he created his first operetta, "Eine Nacht als Pascha" (A Night as A Pasha), which was lost.

During the war he was active in the ghetto of Prague until his deportation to Theresienstadt concentration camp, where he remained active as a musician. On 28 September 1944, he was transported from Terezin to Auschwitz, where he was directly sent to the gas chambers. Adolf Strauss's wife Maria survived the war in the city of Leipzig.

== Works and recordings ==
A song that he composed in the camp with Ludwig Hift, "Ich weiss bestimmt, ich werd dich wiedersehen" (I know for sure that I'll see you again), was recorded in 2007 by Anne Sofie von Otter (Bengt Forsberg piano, Daniel Hope violin, Bebe Risenfors accordion) on Deutsche Grammophon (477 6546) and by baritone Benjamin Appl (James Baillieu, piano) on Sony Classical (88985393032) in the album Heimat released in 2017.
