= Doupov Mountains =

Coordinates: 50°15′N 13°00′E

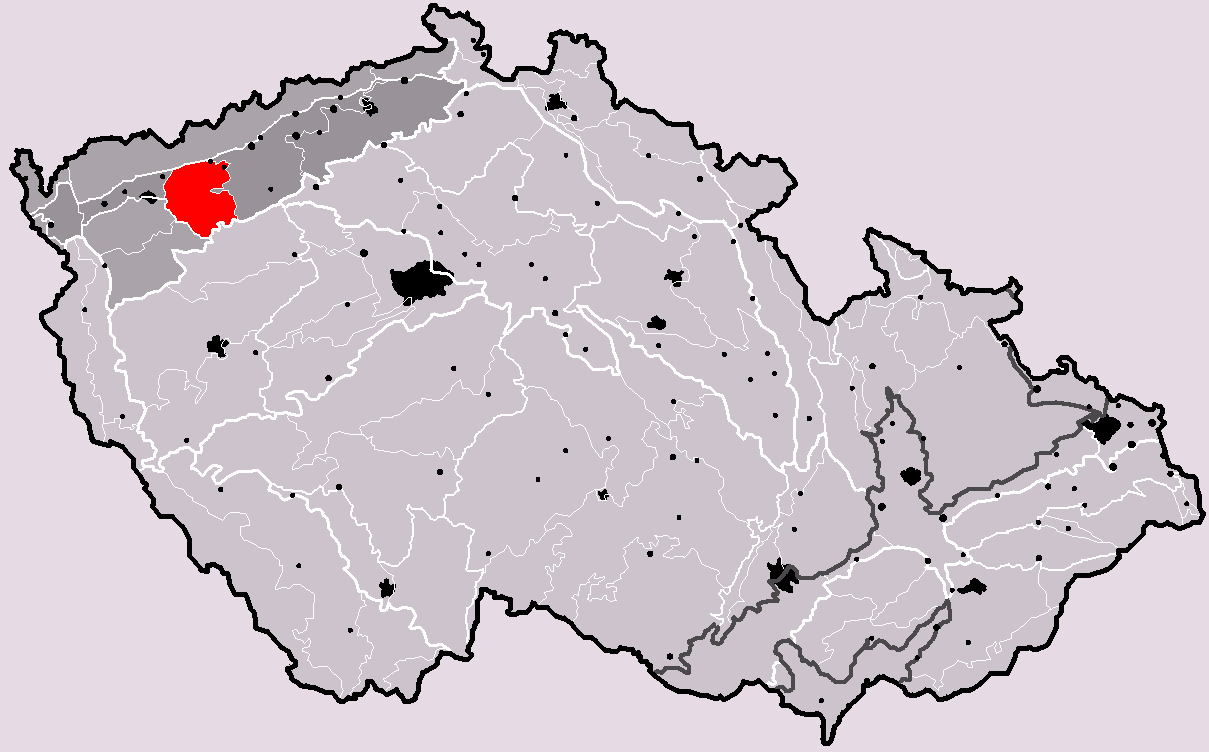
Location of Doupov Mountains in the Czech Republic

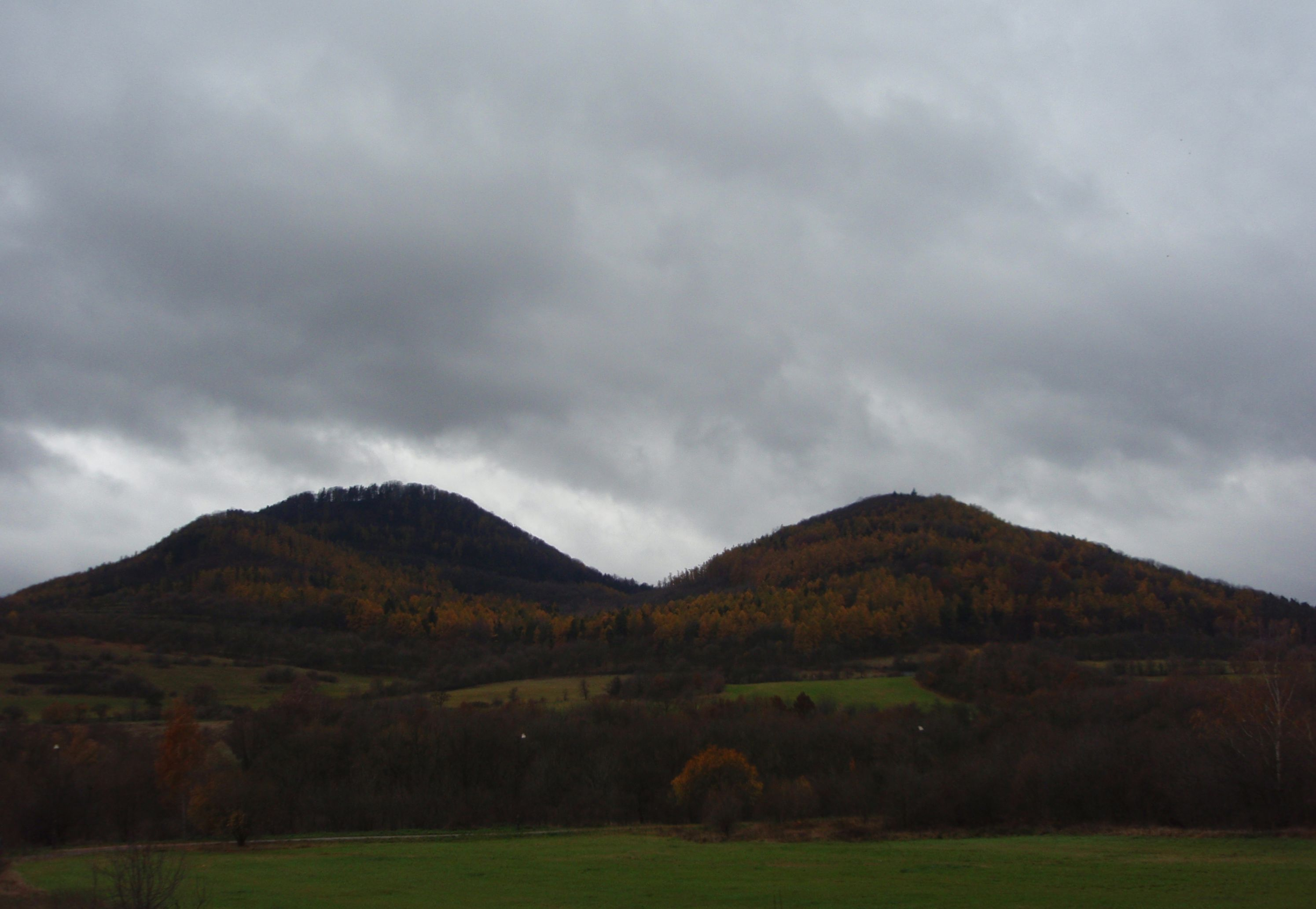
Doupov Mountains as seen from Klášterec nad Ohří

Doupov Mountains (Czech: Doupovské hory, German: Duppauer Gebirge) is a Cenozoic volcanic mountain range with the typical structure of stratovolcano. The centre of the stratovolcano was in the place of a former town of Doupov.

The highest mountain is Hradiště (934 metres), the lowest point is by the river Ohře near Kadaň (cca 275 metres).

In 1945, most of the German population was expelled so that Doupov Mountains became almost completely unpopulated. It became an Army Training Area in 1953, and currently serves this purpose for NATO forces.
