= Vilémov (Chomutov District) =

- Municipality
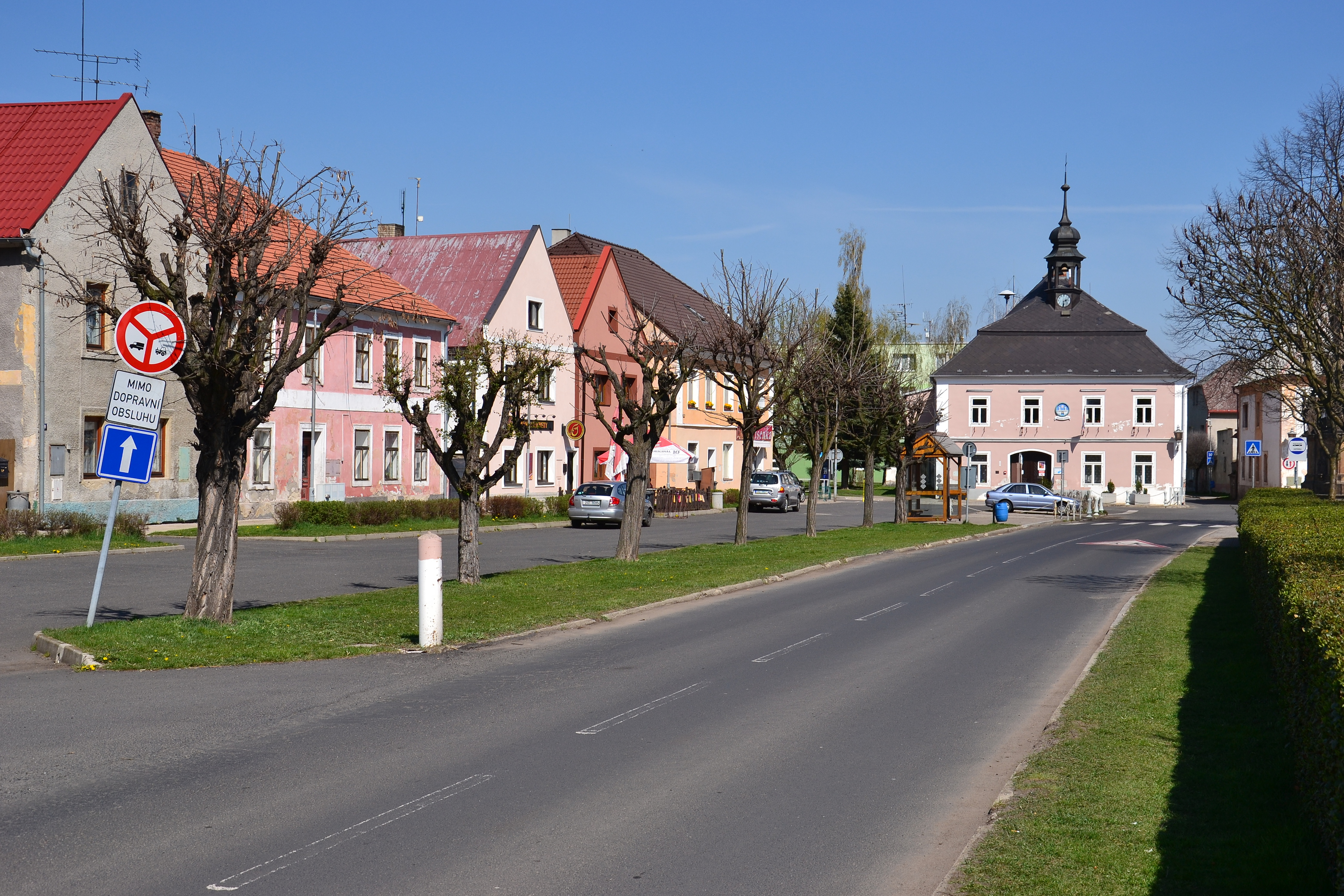
- Centre of Vilémov

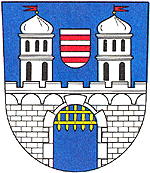
- Flag Coat of arms

- Location in the Czech Republic
- Coordinates: 50°18′4″N 13°18′44″E
- Country: Czech Republic
- Region: Ústí nad Labem
- District: Chomutov
- First mentioned: 1342

Area
  - Total: 18.83 km^{2} (7.27 sq mi)
- Elevation: 297 m (974 ft)

Population (2026-01-01)
  - Total: 641
  - Density: 34.0/km^{2} (88.2/sq mi)
- Time zone: UTC+1 (CET)
  - Summer (DST): UTC+2 (CEST)
- Postal codes: 431 54, 432 01
- Website: www.obec-vilemov.cz

Vilémov (German: Willomitz) is a municipality and village in Chomutov District in the Ústí nad Labem Region of the Czech Republic. It has about 600 inhabitants.

Vilémov lies approximately 20 kilometres (12 mi) south of Chomutov, 65 km (40 mi) south-west of Ústí nad Labem, and 82 km (51 mi) west of Prague.

== Administrative division ==
Vilémov consists of four municipal parts (in brackets population according to the 2021 census):

- Vilémov (441)
- Blov (67)
- Vinaře (61)
- Zahořany (21)

== Demographics ==
Historical population
Year	Pop.	±%
1869	1,340	—
1880	1,584	+18.2%
1890	1,707	+7.8%
1900	1,640	−3.9%
1910	1,484	−9.5%
1921	1,704	+14.8%
1930	1,542	−9.5%
1950	855	−44.6%
1961	895	+4.7%
1970	809	−9.6%
1980	726	−10.3%
1991	617	−15.0%
2001	590	−4.4%
2011	572	−3.1%
2021	590	+3.1%
Source: Censuses
