= Žatec =

- Town
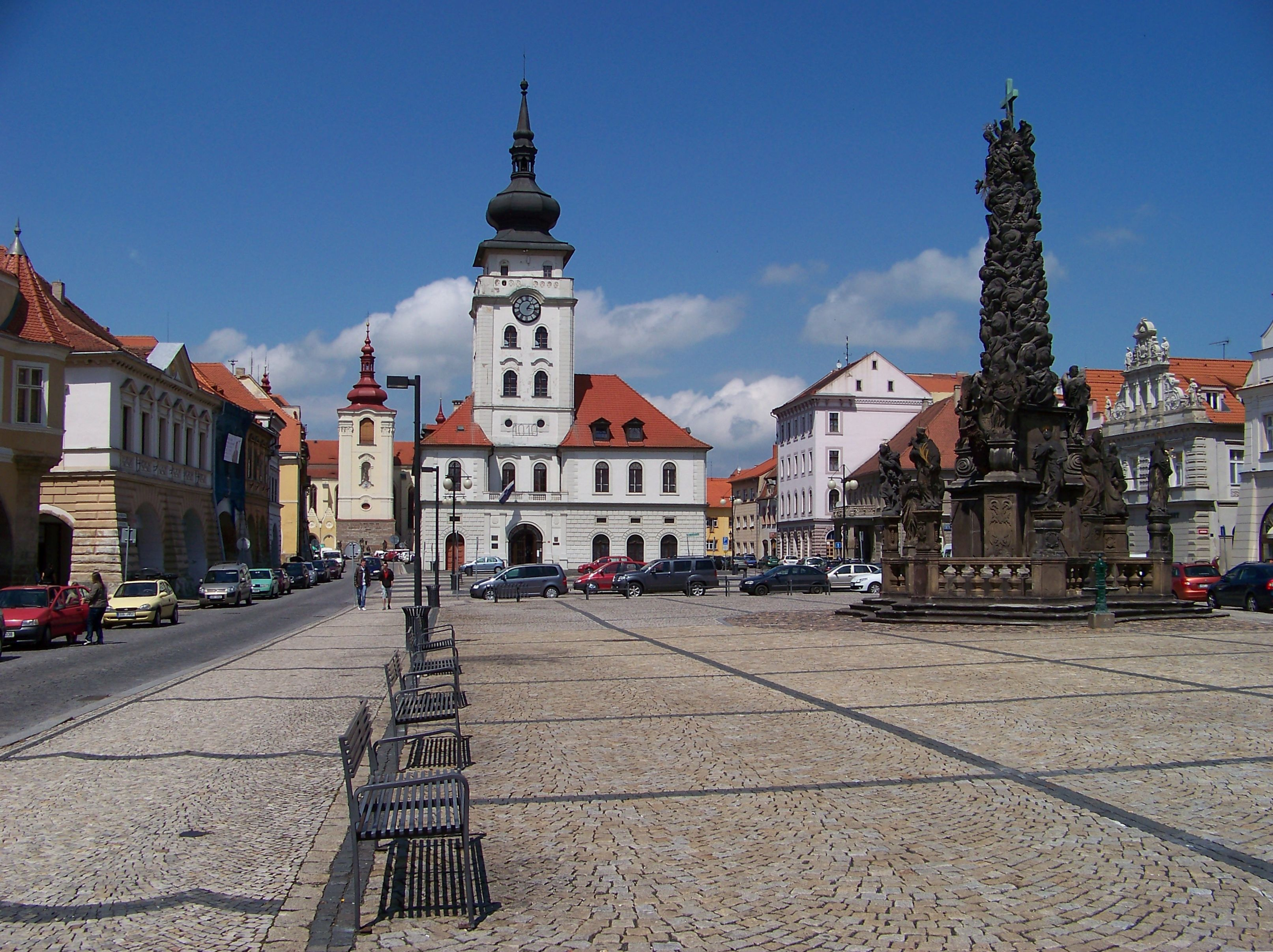
- The square Náměstí Svobody with the town hall and Holy Trinity Column

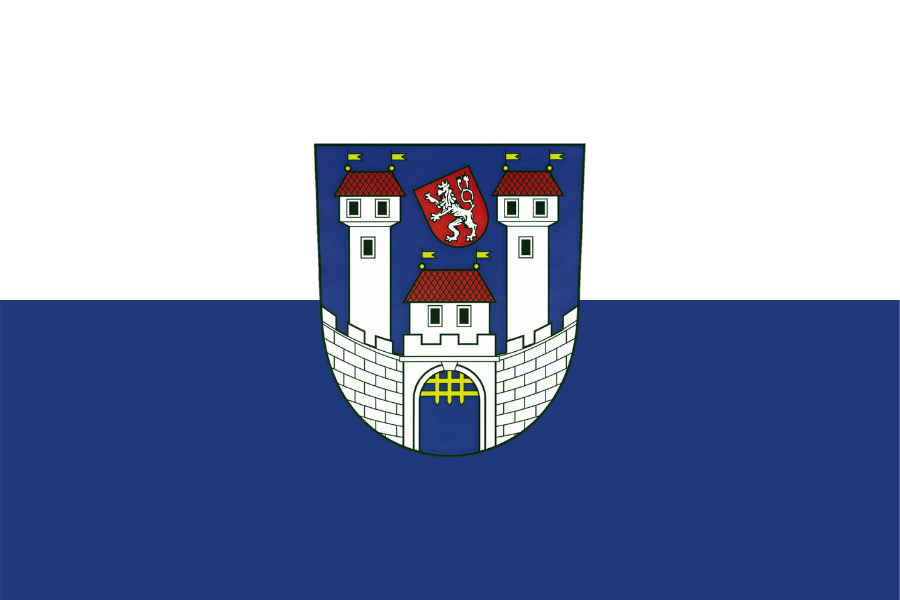
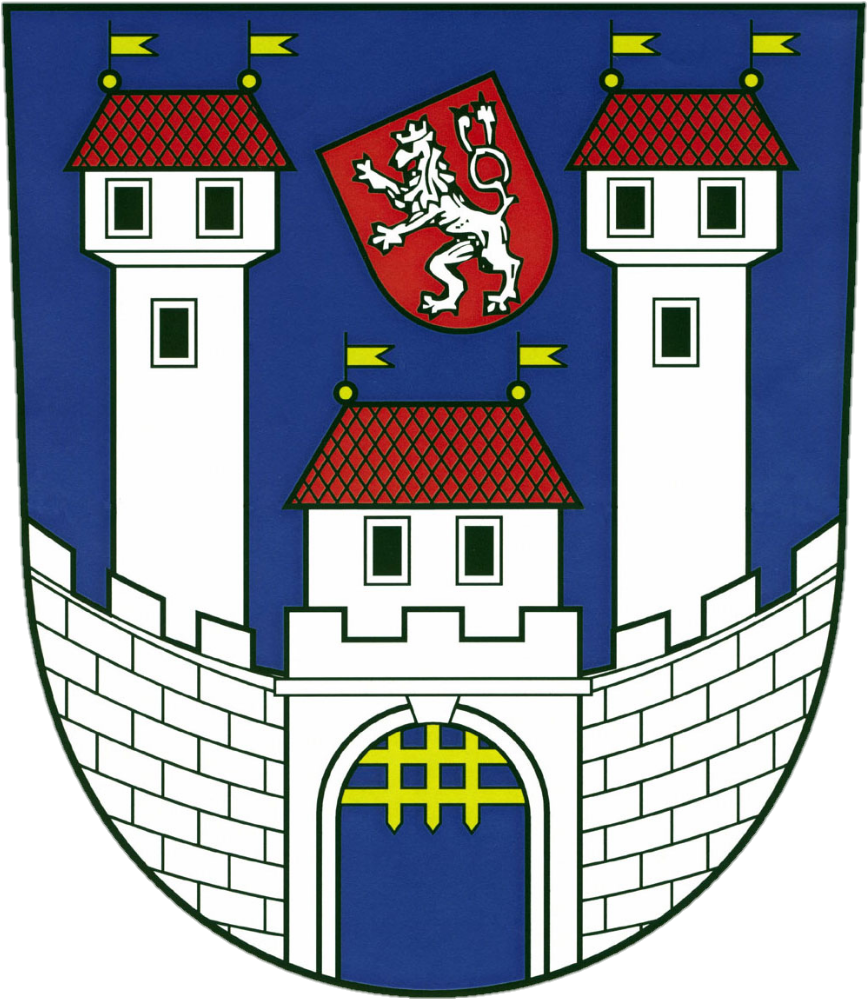
- Flag Coat of arms

- Location in the Czech Republic
- Coordinates: 50°19′48″N 13°32′40″E
- Country: Czech Republic
- Region: Ústí nad Labem
- District: Louny
- First mentioned: 1004

Government
  - Mayor: Radim Laibl

Area
  - Total: 42.68 km^{2} (16.48 sq mi)
- Elevation: 233 m (764 ft)

Population (2026-01-01)
  - Total: 18,984
  - Density: 444.8/km^{2} (1,152/sq mi)
- Time zone: UTC+1 (CET)
  - Summer (DST): UTC+2 (CEST)
- Postal code: 438 01
- Website: www.mesto-zatec.cz

UNESCO World Heritage Site
- Official name: Žatec and the Landscape of Saaz Hops
- Criteria: iii, iv, v
- Reference: 1558
- Inscription: 2023 (45th Session)

Žatec (Czech pronunciation: [ˈʒa.tɛt͡s]; German: Saaz) is a town in Louny District in the Ústí nad Labem Region of the Czech Republic. It has about 19,000 inhabitants. The town lies on the Ohře River in the Most Basin.

Žatec became a town in the 13th century. The town is famous for an over-700-year-long tradition of growing Saaz noble hops used by several breweries. Žatec and the Landscape of Saaz Hops was included in the UNESCO World Heritage List in 2023. The historic town centre is well preserved and is protected as an urban monument reservation and partly also as an urban monument zone. Among the main landmarks of Žatec is the Church of the Assumption of the Virgin Mary.

== Administrative division ==
Žatec consists of seven municipal parts (in brackets population according to the 2021 census):

- Žatec (17,729)
- Bezděkov (338)
- Milčeves (97)
- Radíčeves (141)
- Trnovany (26)
- Velichov (86)
- Záhoří (50)

== Etymology ==
The name Žatec is derived from the Old Czech words záteč, zateč. It was a designation for a place on a river where ice accumulates in a narrowed channel.

== Geography ==
Žatec is located about 18 kilometres (11 mi) west of Louny and 62 km (39 mi) northwest of Prague. It lies in an agricultural landscape in the Most Basin. The highest point is at 337 m (1,106 ft) above sea level. The Ohře River flows through the town. The Liboc River joins the Ohře on the western outskirts of the town. The Blšanka River flows through the Trnovany part of Žatec and then joins the Ohře just outside the territory of Žatec.

=== Climate ===
Žatec's climate is classified as oceanic climate (Köppen: Cfb; Trewartha: Dobk). Among them, the annual average temperature is 9.5 °C (49.1 °F), the hottest month in July is 19.6 °C (67.3 °F), and the coldest month is 0.1 °C (32.2 °F) in January. The annual precipitation is 475.8 millimetres (18.73 in), of which July is the wettest with 69.9 millimetres (2.75 in), while February is the driest with only 17.8 millimetres (0.70 in). The extreme temperature throughout the year ranged from −31.2 °C (−24.2 °F) on 11 February 1929 to 38.9 °C (102.0 °F) on 20 August 2012.

Climate data for Žatec, 1991–2020 normals, extremes 1897–present
| Month | Jan | Feb | Mar | Apr | May | Jun | Jul | Aug | Sep | Oct | Nov | Dec | Year |
|---|---|---|---|---|---|---|---|---|---|---|---|---|---|
| Record high °C (°F) | 17.2 (63.0) | 20.5 (68.9) | 24.6 (76.3) | 30.6 (87.1) | 34.5 (94.1) | 37.3 (99.1) | 38.3 (100.9) | 38.9 (102.0) | 34.5 (94.1) | 27.7 (81.9) | 20.2 (68.4) | 17.5 (63.5) | 38.9 (102.0) |
| Mean daily maximum °C (°F) | 2.9 (37.2) | 5.1 (41.2) | 10.0 (50.0) | 16.4 (61.5) | 20.8 (69.4) | 24.0 (75.2) | 26.2 (79.2) | 26.0 (78.8) | 20.6 (69.1) | 13.9 (57.0) | 7.4 (45.3) | 3.6 (38.5) | 14.8 (58.6) |
| Daily mean °C (°F) | 0.1 (32.2) | 1.0 (33.8) | 4.6 (40.3) | 9.7 (49.5) | 14.4 (57.9) | 17.8 (64.0) | 19.6 (67.3) | 18.8 (65.8) | 13.9 (57.0) | 8.9 (48.0) | 4.4 (39.9) | 1.0 (33.8) | 9.5 (49.1) |
| Mean daily minimum °C (°F) | −2.8 (27.0) | −2.6 (27.3) | 0.0 (32.0) | 3.0 (37.4) | 7.5 (45.5) | 11.2 (52.2) | 12.9 (55.2) | 12.3 (54.1) | 8.5 (47.3) | 4.7 (40.5) | 1.5 (34.7) | −1.7 (28.9) | 4.5 (40.1) |
| Record low °C (°F) | −25.1 (−13.2) | −31.2 (−24.2) | −25.1 (−13.2) | −9.5 (14.9) | −3.8 (25.2) | 0.5 (32.9) | 3.5 (38.3) | 2.6 (36.7) | −4.5 (23.9) | −8.5 (16.7) | −14.5 (5.9) | −26.5 (−15.7) | −31.2 (−24.2) |
| Average precipitation mm (inches) | 20.1 (0.79) | 17.8 (0.70) | 25.6 (1.01) | 28.5 (1.12) | 53.0 (2.09) | 65.4 (2.57) | 69.9 (2.75) | 67.3 (2.65) | 42.2 (1.66) | 30.5 (1.20) | 28.9 (1.14) | 26.6 (1.05) | 475.8 (18.73) |
| Average snowfall cm (inches) | 11.7 (4.6) | 9.0 (3.5) | 4.2 (1.7) | 0.4 (0.2) | 0.0 (0.0) | 0.0 (0.0) | 0.0 (0.0) | 0.0 (0.0) | 0.0 (0.0) | 0.0 (0.0) | 1.9 (0.7) | 7.8 (3.1) | 35.0 (13.8) |
| Average relative humidity (%) | 82.0 | 77.9 | 72.9 | 66.0 | 67.1 | 68.1 | 67.4 | 70.8 | 77.2 | 82.0 | 85.3 | 84.5 | 75.1 |
| Mean monthly sunshine hours | 38.8 | 71.5 | 120.6 | 184.2 | 212.9 | 216.3 | 230.7 | 222.9 | 157.5 | 89.9 | 37.6 | 31.1 | 1,613.9 |
Source: Czech Hydrometeorological Institute

== History ==
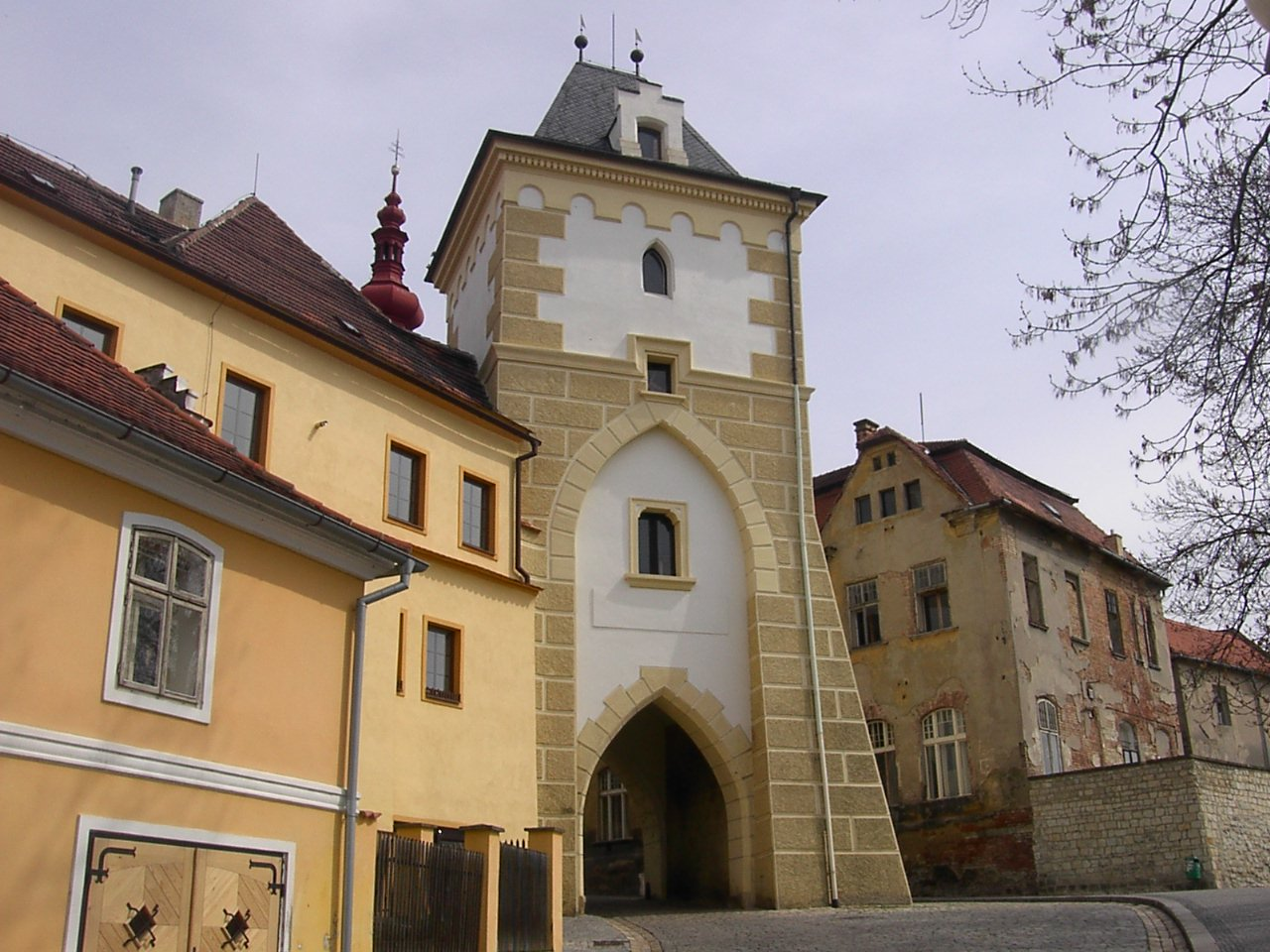
The Priests' Gate, part of remains of the town fortifications

The first written mention of Žatec is in the Latin chronicle of Thietmar of Merseburg of 1004. In 1248, Žatec was firstly titled as a town. In 1265, it received the privileges of a royal town from King Ottokar II.

In the 16th century, Žatec had around 5,000 inhabitants and was one of the most populous towns in the kingdom. In 1827, a chain bridge over the Ohře, the first chain bridge in Bohemia, was built.

From the outbreak of the Hussite Wars in 1419 to the Thirty Years' War, the town was Hussite or Protestant, but after the Battle of White Mountain in 1620, the greater part of the Czech inhabitants left the town. It remained an ethnically German town until 1945, when the Germans were expelled. On 3 June 1945, 5,000 male Sudeten German inhabitants from Žatec were marched to the town square of Postoloprty, and at least 763 were murdered. Estimates range up to 2,000 victims killed by Czechoslovak military on the march, in Postoloprty, and in Žatec on and after the march.

== Demographics ==
Historical population

| Year | Pop. | ±% |
|---|---|---|
| 1869 | 10,050 | — |
| 1880 | 11,716 | +16.6% |
| 1890 | 14,590 | +24.5% |
| 1900 | 17,858 | +22.4% |
| 1910 | 18,745 | +5.0% |

| Year | Pop. | ±% |
|---|---|---|
| 1921 | 17,761 | −5.2% |
| 1930 | 19,806 | +11.5% |
| 1950 | 14,088 | −28.9% |
| 1961 | 15,661 | +11.2% |
| 1970 | 16,525 | +5.5% |

| Year | Pop. | ±% |
|---|---|---|
| 1980 | 19,145 | +15.9% |
| 1991 | 20,320 | +6.1% |
| 2001 | 19,919 | −2.0% |
| 2011 | 18,786 | −5.7% |
| 2021 | 18,467 | −1.7% |

Source: Censuses

== Economy ==
Žatec and its surroundings is known for its tradition of growing Saaz hops. Saaz hops or Žatec hops is a protected designation of origin.

The tradition of beer brewing started here in 1261; growing of hops is first documented in 1348. In 1800–1801, the Žatec Brewery started its production, which continues to this day.

== Transport ==
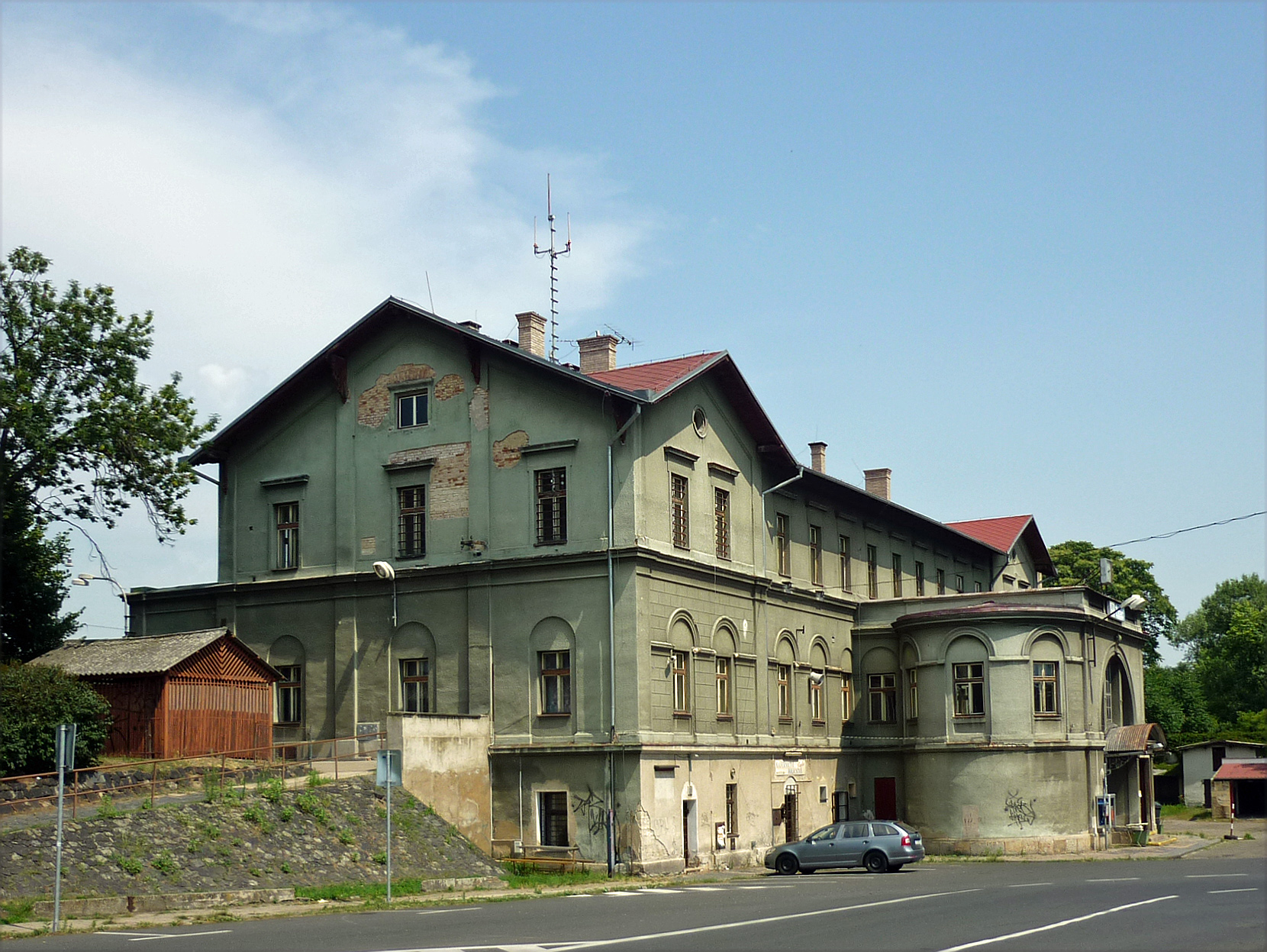
Žatec train station

Žatec is located on the railway line Plzeň–Most. The town is served by two train stations: Žatec and Žatec západ.

== Culture ==
Žatec hosts Dočesná, a hops-related harvest festival. It takes place on the town square every September.

== Education ==
Žatec is home to three secondary schools: Žatec Gymnasium, Business Academy and Secondary Vocational School of Agriculture and Ecology, and Secondary Vocational School SČMSD (focused on the hotel industry and gastronomy). There are six primary schools and a primary art school.

== Sport ==
Žatec is represented by the football club FK Slavoj Žatec, playing in lower amateur tiers. It was founded in 1936.

The main sports facility is the Mládí Stadium. It was founded in 1965.

The Flora Stadium is a sports facility in the south of the town. It was founded between 1924 and 1938. Until 1960, it had a motorcycle speedway track at the site.

== Sights ==
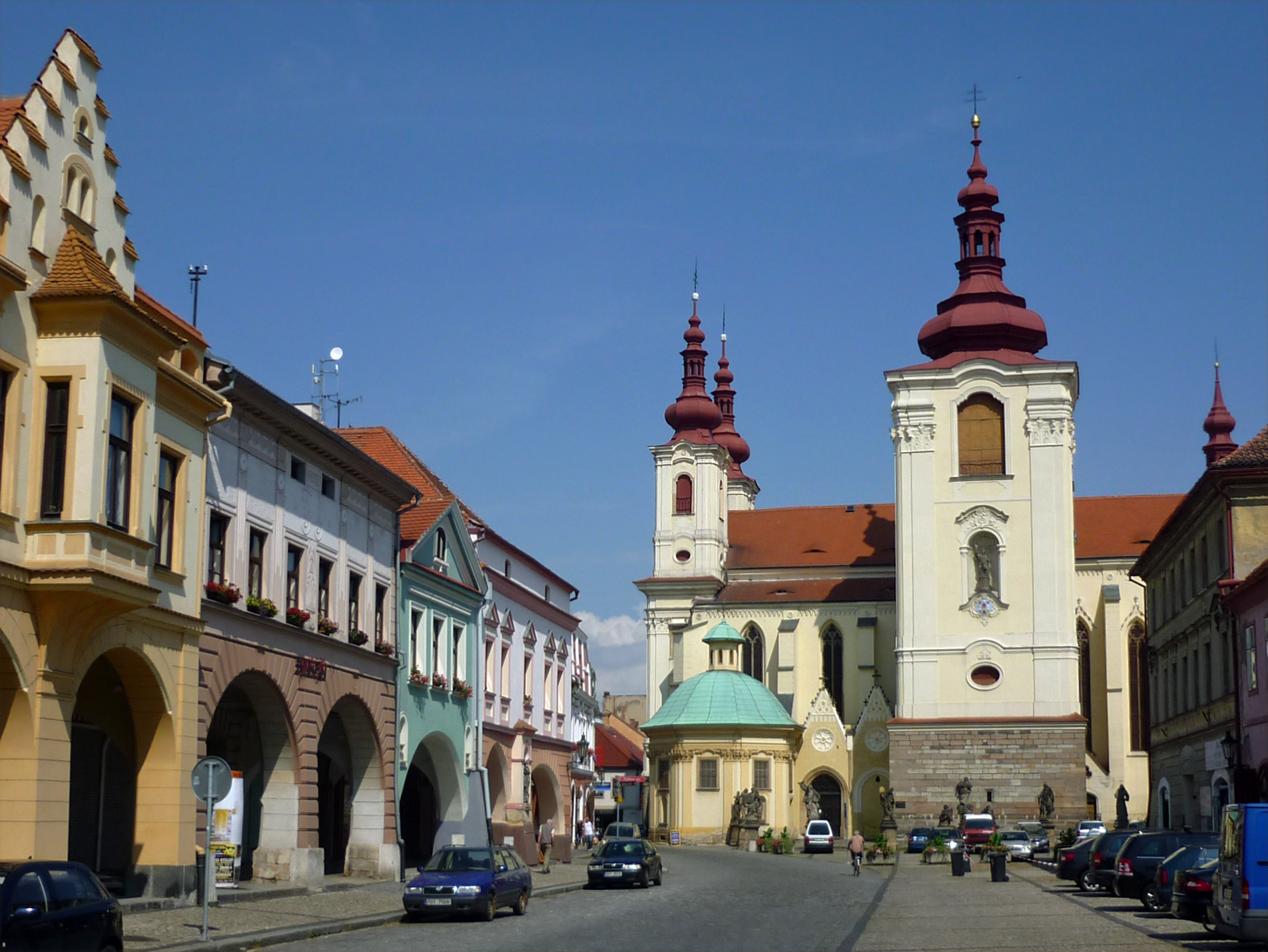
The square Hošťálkovo náměstí with Church of the Assumption of the Virgin Mary

Since 1961, the historic core of Žatec has been protected as an urban monument reservation. It is a collection of important buildings and architectural styles from the Romanesque period to the Art Nouveau.

Since 2003, the area south of the historic centre has been protected as an urban monument zone. It is valuable mainly for its technical constructions related to hop growing.

The Church of the Assumption of the Virgin Mary is one of the most significant monuments. It was originally built in the Romanesque style and some of its Romanesque parts are still preserved. In 1724–1728, the Chapel of Saint John of Nepomuk was added. Around 1740, the west façade was reconstructed in the Baroque style.

The hop-growing and brewing tradition is widely presented by the town. There are Hop Museum and Brewing Museum. The Temple of Hops and Beer is a tourist complex with several attractions, including a lookout tower and a small astronomical clock. Žatec and the Landscape of Saaz Hops (which includes the village of Trnovany within Žatec and the village of Stekník) was included in the UNESCO World Heritage List in 2023.

Retro Computer in Žatec is a permanent exhibition of home computers from the 1970s to the 1990s. It is a private collection of over 135 pieces of functional technology.

== In popular culture ==
Žatec was used as a filming location for many historical films and TV series, including Yentl (1983), The Young Indiana Jones Chronicles (1992), Les Misérables (1998), The Scarlet Pimpernel (1999), Oliver Twist (1999), Burning Bush (2013), The Zookeeper's Wife (2016), A Bag of Marbles (2017) and Oscar-winning Jojo Rabbit (2019).

== Notable people ==
- Johannes von Tepl (c. 1350 – c. 1415), writer
- Eugen Gura (1842–1906), German operatic baritone
- Gabriel Anton (1858–1933), Austrian neurologist and psychiatrist
- Adolf Strauss (1902–1944), pianist and composer
- Maria Treben (1907–1991), Austrian author and herbalist
- Karel Reiner (1910–1979), composer and pianist
- Peter Glaser (1923–2014), Czech-American scientist and aerospace engineer
- Zdeněk Svěrák (born 1936), actor, humorist and screenwriter; lived here in the 1960s
- Miroslav Varga (born 1960), sport shooter, Olympic winner
- Jan Svěrák (born 1965), film director
- Jaromír Zmrhal (born 1993), footballer

== Twin towns – sister cities ==
Žatec is twinned with:

- Krasnystaw, Poland
- Poperinge, Belgium
- Thum, Germany
- Žalec, Slovenia
