= Ohře =

River in the Czech Republic and Germany

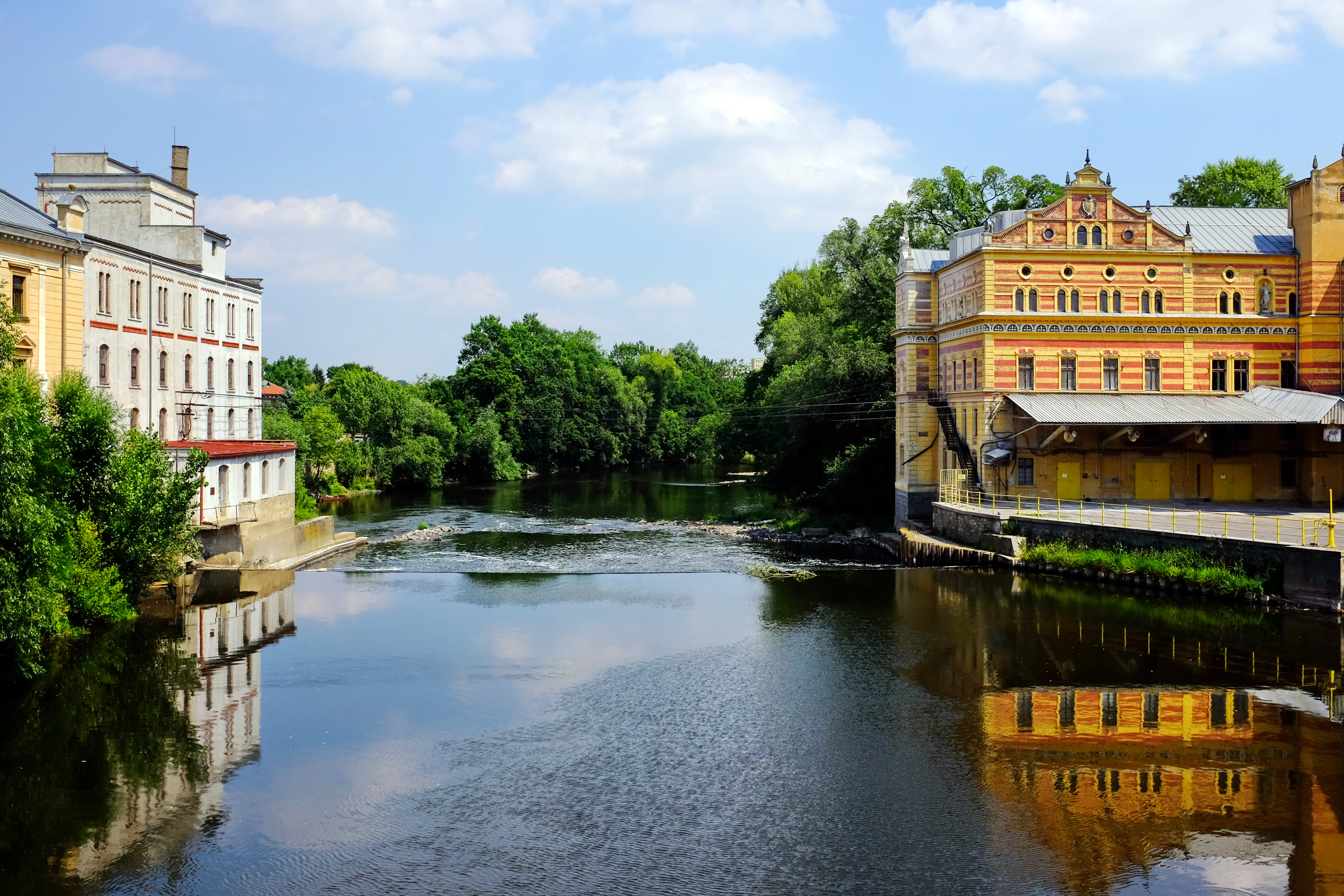
- The Ohře in Louny

Location
- Countries: Czech Republic; Germany
- States/ Regions: Bavaria; Karlovy Vary; Ústí nad Labem

Physical characteristics
- Source
  - location: Bad Weißenstadt, Fichtel Mountains
  - coordinates: 50°4′29″N 11°49′35″E
  - elevation: 752 m (2,467 ft)
- Mouth
  - location: Elbe
  - coordinates: 50°31′44″N 14°8′11″E
  - elevation: 143 m (469 ft)
- Length: 304.6 km (189.3 mi)
- Basin size: 5,606.1 km^{2} (2,164.5 sq mi)
- Discharge
  - average: 38 m^{3}/s (1,300 cu ft/s)

Basin features
- Progression: Elbe→ North Sea

The Ohře (Czech pronunciation: [ˈoɦr̝ɛ]), also known in English and German as Eger (German pronunciation: [ˈeːɡɐ]), is a river in Germany and the Czech Republic, a left tributary of the Elbe River. It flows through the Bavarian district of Upper Franconia in Germany, and through the Karlovy Vary and Ústí nad Labem regions in the Czech Republic. It is 304.6 km (189.3 mi) long, of which 256 km (159 mi) is in the Czech Republic, making it the fourth longest river in the country.

== Etymology ==
The name is of Celtic or pre-Celtic origin. In the 9th century, it appeared as Agara. According to one theory, its meaning was 'salmon river' (composed of the words ag, eg – 'salmon', and are, ara – 'flowing water'). Another theory suggests that the name was derived from agriā and meant a fast-moving, fast-flowing river. In the 12th century, Ohře was written as Egre, Oegre and Ogre.

== Course ==
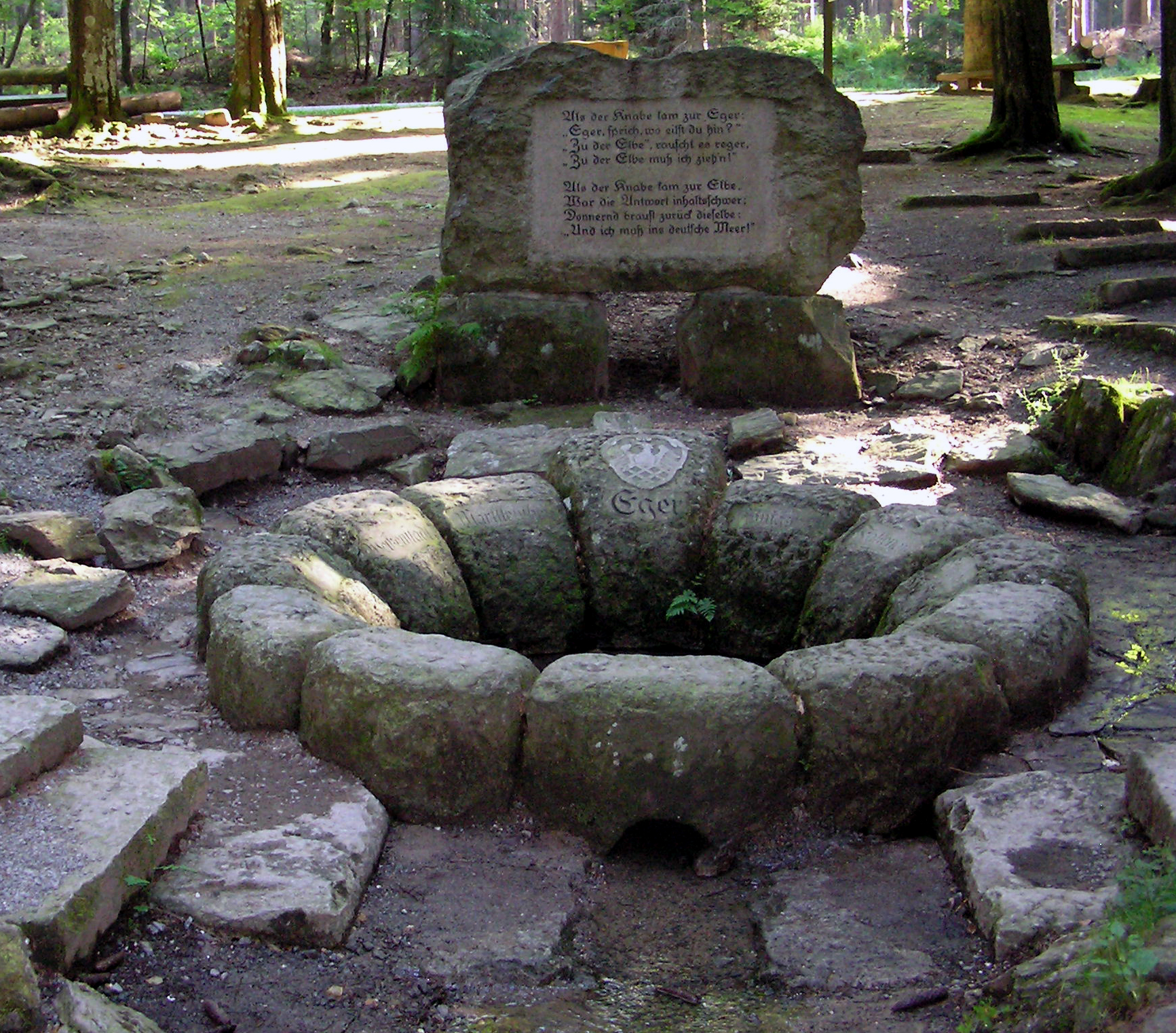
The inscription on the source of the Ohře reads: Als der Knabe kam zur Eger: "Eger, sprich, wo eilst du hin?" "Zu der Elbe", rauscht es reger, "Zu der Elbe muß ich zieh'n!" Als der Knabe kam zur Elbe, War die Antwort inhaltsschwer; Donnernd braust zurück dieselbe: "Und ich muß ins deutsche Meer!" When the boy came to the Ohře: "Ohře, speak, where are you rushing to?" "To the Elbe", whooshes it astirly, "To the Elbe I must draw!" When the boy came to the Elbe, The answer was profound; Thundering booms back the selfsame: "And I must (go) into the German Sea!"

The Ohře originates in the territory of Bad Weißenstadt in the Fichtel Mountains at an elevation of 752 m (2,467 ft), below the Schneeberg mountain. It flows to Litoměřice, where it enters the Elbe River at an elevation of 143 m (469 ft).

The Ohře flows through the Fichtel Mountains in an eastward direction, through Lake Weissenstadt (Weißenstädter See) and through the towns of Röslau and Marktleuthen, and, after almost 50 km, reaches the Czech–German border near Hohenberg an der Eger. It then flows through the historic region of the Czech Republic which was known until 1945 as Egerland. The river passes the towns of Cheb (German: Eger, like the river), Loket, Sokolov, Karlovy Vary, Klášterec nad Ohří, Kadaň, Žatec, Louny, Libochovice, Budyně nad Ohří and Terezín before flowing into the river Elbe at Litoměřice.

The river is 304.6 km (189.3 mi) long, of which 256 km (159 mi) is in the Czech Republic, (Note: The Ohře touches the territory of the Czech Republic for the first time at the 256th river km, and from this moment on its "Czech" part is counted, although in the next 3.7 km the total volume of the flow briefly returns to the territory of Germany several times. From the 252.3 river km (the confluence with the Röslau), the course of the river leaves the Czech–German border and flows only through the Czech Republic.) (Note: Povodí Ohře (state enterprise, whose activity is the care and administration of the river basin) calculated the length of the river to the confluence with the Röslau (i.e. without the section that forms the Czech–German border) at 253.6 km (157.6 mi) and the total length at 302.0 km (187.7 mi).) (Note: Due to the construction of two reservoirs on the river and the straightening of meanders, the calculated length on the river in the Czech Republic by the T. G. Masaryk Water Research Institute is 246.6 km (153.2 mi), however, this length does not correspond to the numbering of river kilometres.) making it the fourth longest river in the Czech Republic. The German part of the river (including the border section) is 49.8 km (30.9 mi) long.

The highest volume flow rate occurs in spring. The average volume flow rate at the mouth is 37.94 m³/s. The lower part of the river flows through areas with the lowest average precipitation in the Czech Republic (400–500 mm).

=== Drainage basin ===
The Ohře's drainage basin has an area of 5,606.1 km^{2} (2,164.5 sq mi). (Note: According to the older measurements, the area was 5,613.7 km^{2} (2,167.5 sq mi).) The area of the drainage basin in the Czech Republic is 4,601.1 km^{2} (1,776.5 sq mi), in Bavaria is 920.4 km^{2} (355.4 sq mi). The rest of the drainage basin is in Saxony.

The drainage basin is divided to further third-level basin areas:

| Basin code | Basin name | Area (km^{2}) |
|---|---|---|
| 1-13-01 | Ohře to the confluence with Teplá | 2,471.0 |
| 1-13-02 | Teplá and Ohře to the confluence with Liboc | 1,147.1 |
| 1-13-03 | Liboc and Ohře to the confluence with Chomutovka | 1,262.7 |
| 1-13-04 | Ohře from Chomutovka to the mouth | 725.3 |

=== Tributaries ===
The longest tributaries of the Ohře are:

| Tributary | Length (km) | River km | Side |
|---|---|---|---|
| Wondreb / Odrava | 66.1 | 224.1 | right |
| Teplá | 65.1 | 175.3 | right |
| Blšanka | 50.8 | 81.3 | right |
| Chomutovka | 50.4 | 65.8 | left |
| Röslau / Reslava | 46.4 | 252.3 | right |
| Liboc | 46.4 | 91.1 | right |
| Svatava / Zwota | 41.0 | 203.0 | left |
| Rolava | 36.6 | 177.4 | left |
| Libocký potok | 31.8 | 219.4 | left |
| Bystřice | 29.6 | 153.8 | left |
| Plesná / Fleißenbach | 29.1 | 226.6 | left |
| Prunéřovský potok | 24.7 | 126.4 | left |
| Hasina | 24.4 | 69.8 | right |
| Smolnický potok | 23.6 | 47.0 | right |
| Libava | 22.7 | 216.9 | right |
| Chodovský potok | 22.7 | 178.0 | left |
| Slatinný potok | 20.8 | 236.0 | left |
| Lobezský potok | 20.0 | 202.7 | right |

== Use ==
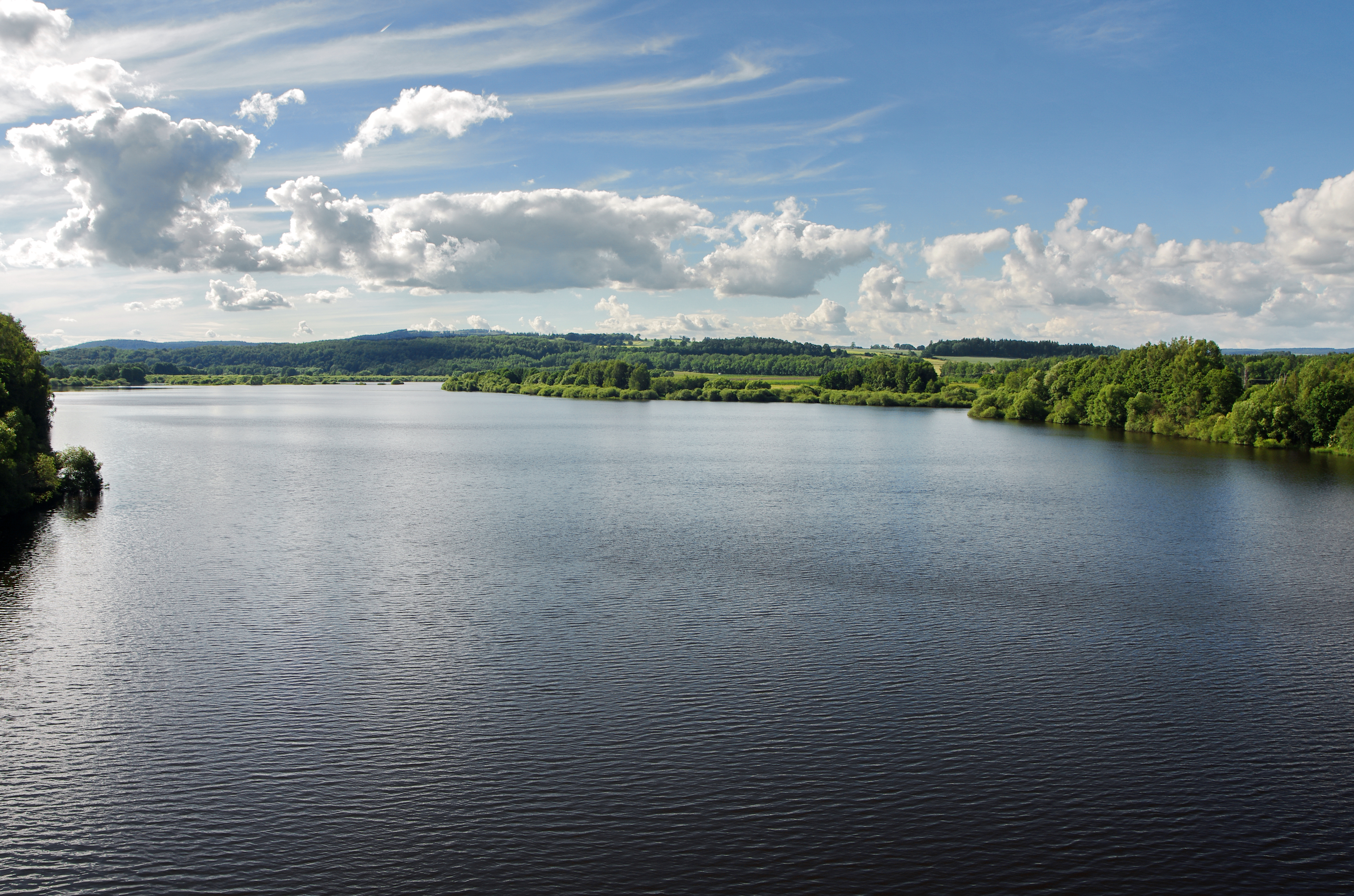
Skalka Reservoir

The Ohře is primarily used for irrigation and hydroelectric energy. There are two reservoirs: Skalka (built in 1962–1964, area 378 ha (930 acres)) and Nechranice (built 1961–1968, area 1,338 ha (3,310 acres)).
