= Saaz hops =

Variety of hops

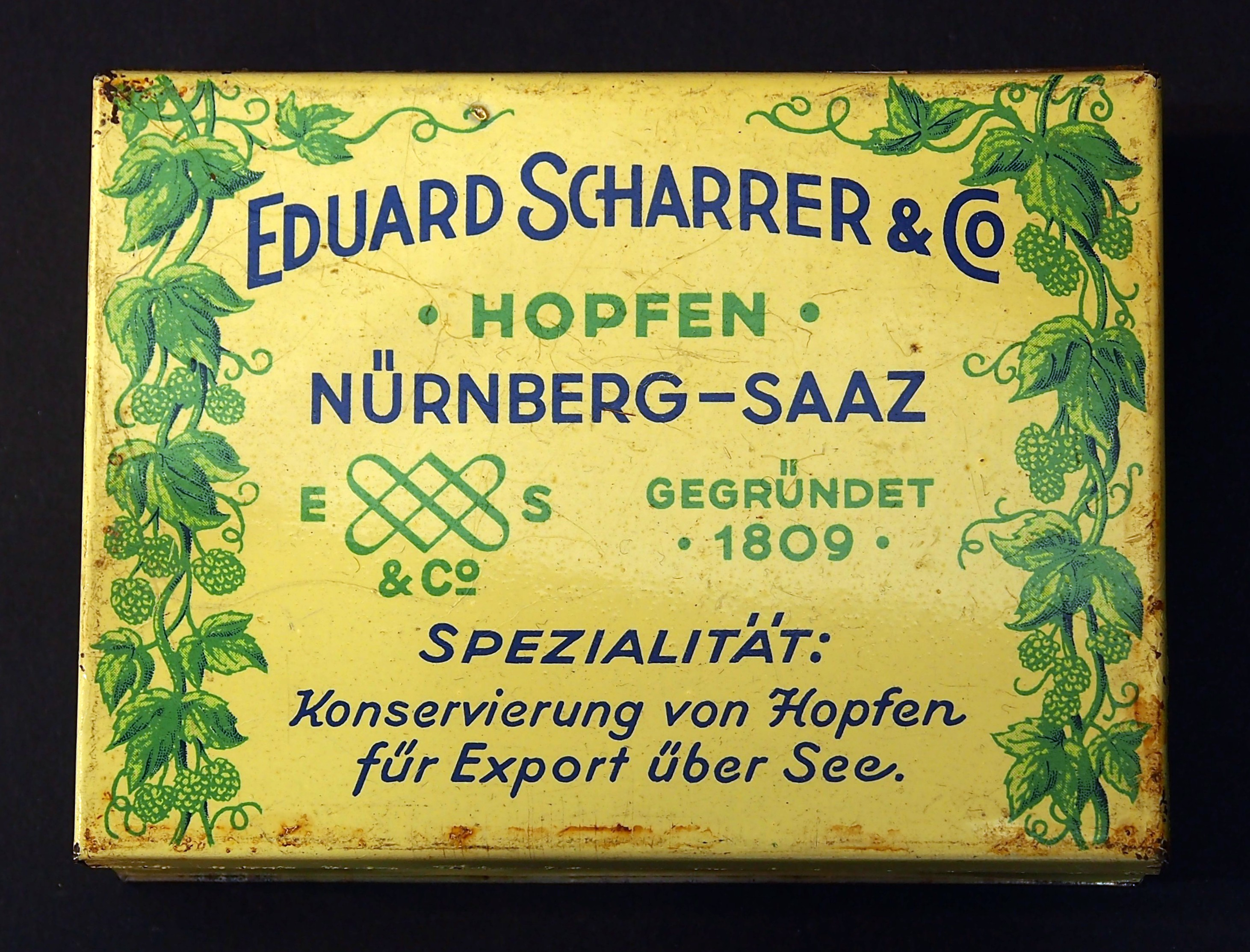
Tin of Saaz hops

Saaz is a "noble" variety of hops. It was named after the Czech town of Žatec (German: Saaz). This hop is used extensively in Bohemia to flavor beer as the Czech pilsner.

Saaz hops accounted for more than 2/3 of total 2009 hop production in the Czech Republic. It is the main hop variety used in the production of global beer Stella Artois, a Belgian pilsner.

== Characteristics ==
Saaz has a distinctive flavour. When used in beer, the resultant aroma is very mild, earthy, herbal and spicy. Despite its popularity and noble pedigree, Saaz generally has a very low Alpha acid level and is not very effective as a bittering hop. This hop is generally used for Bohemian style lagers and pilseners.

Another variety of Saaz hops has been propagated in the United States of America. The US variety has a higher Alpha acid content than the original Czech variety.

== Acid and oil breakdown ==
Property	Czech variety	US variety
Yield (kg/ha)	800–1,200	N/A
Alpha acids (%)	2.5–4.0	6.3–7.0
Beta acids (%)	4.6–6.0	N/A
Alpha/beta ratio	0.6–0.9	N/A
Cohumulone (% of alpha acids):	23–26	N/A
Colupulone (% of alpha acids):	39–43	N/A
Total oils (mls. per 100 grams dried hops)	0.4–1.0	0.6
Myrcene (as % of total oils)	25–40	37
Linalool (as % of total oils)	0.4–0.8	N/A
Caryophyllene (as % of total oils)	6–9	7
Humulene (as % of total oils)	15–25	23
Farnesene (as % of total oils)	14–20	N/A
Selinenes (as % of total oils)	0.5–1.5	N/A
Possible substitutions	Centennial, Amarillo, Motueka, Stirling, Summer	
