= Steindöbra =

River in Germany

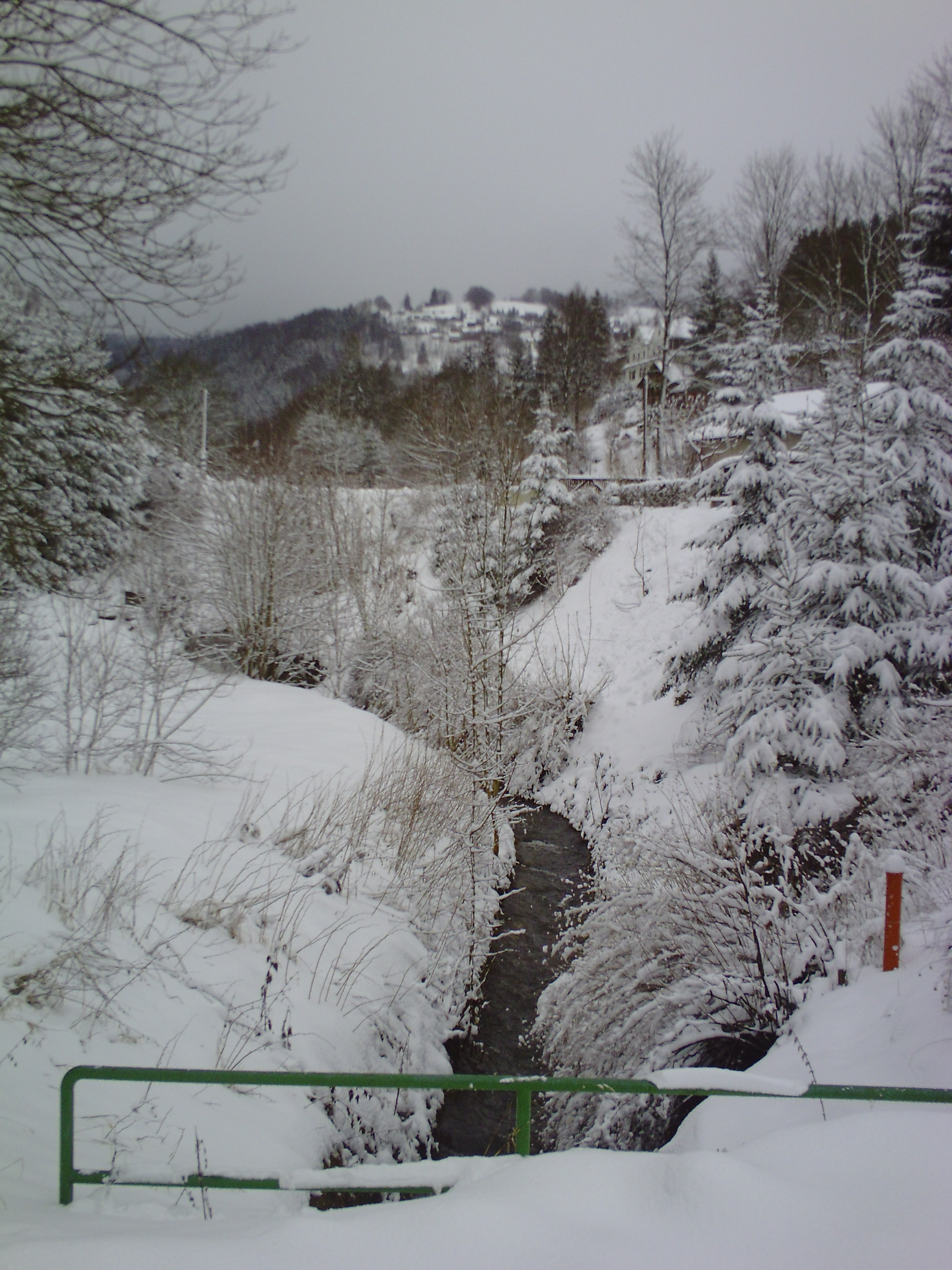
- Winter view of Steindöbra, after junction with Steinbach

Location
- Country: Germany
- State: Saxony

Physical characteristics
- Mouth: Brunndöbra
  - coordinates: 50.3717°N 12.4694°E

Basin features
- Progression: Brunndöbra→ Svatava→ Ohře→ Elbe→ North Sea
- Tributaries
  - right: Steinbach

Steindöbra is a river in Saxony, Germany. Above from its junction with Steinbach, it also takes the name of Mühlbach. It is a right tributary of the Brunndöbra, which it joins in Klingenthal.

Its spring is located roughly 850 m above sea level near the top of Mühlleiten pass in the western Ore Mountains. It flows south, traversing Sachsenberg-Georgenthal, a district of Klingenthal. After approximately three kilometers, it unites with the Brunndöbra and hence continues as Döbra, which in turn unites with the Svatava, its waters thus flowing via the Ohře and Elbe into the North Sea.

Before flowing into the Brunndöbra, a large portion of its course runs side by side with the track of the former meter-gauge light rail.

== See also ==
- List of rivers of Saxony
