= Svatava =

Svatava may refer to places:

- Svatava (river), a river in the Czech Republic and Germany
- Svatava (Sokolov District), a market town in the Czech Republic
- Svatava, a village and part of Černovice (Pelhřimov District) in the Czech Republic
