= Paweł Urbański =

Polish ski jumper

Personal information
- Born: June 27, 1987 (age 39) Zakopane, Poland
- Height: 175 cm (69 in)

Skiing career
- Sport: Alpine skiing
- Club: Start Krokiew Zakopane
Medal record
Representing POL
Junior World Championships
Silver medal – second place	Rovaniemi 2005	Team

Paweł Urbański (born 27 June 1987) is a Polish former ski jumper. He won the silver medal in the team competition at the 2005 Nordic Junior World Ski Championships.

Representing the Start Krokiew Zakopane club, his international career spanned only three seasons, with his final ski jumping competition at age 20. During this time, he won one Continental Cup event on 28 December 2004 in Engelberg. He also competed in the summer edition of the Continental Cup and occasionally in the FIS Cup. In addition to his Junior World Championship silver, Urbański achieved several national successes, including medals at the Silesian Championships, the team event of the Polish Ski Jumping Championships, and the Polish Youth Olympic Days.

== Career ==
In the summer of 1999, he placed 17th at the macroregional championships and 13th in the McDonald's Cup. He reached the top three in the summer school league four times and finished 5th at the National UKS Meetings.

In September 1999, at an international competition for 13-year-olds in Klingenthal, he finished last in 28th place. Two years later, he placed 8th in his age category at the same event.

In December, he was 6th at the macroregional championships and 11th in his category at the TZN Championships. In January, at the Silesian Championships in Szczyrk, he placed 13th (for 1986 and younger) and 26th (for 1984 and younger). He competed in five school league events, with his best result being 3rd place on 27 February. He also finished 12th at the SMS Championships on Mała Krokiew (for 1984 and younger), 5th on Średnia Krokiew, and 6th at the UKS Meetings in his age group. In late March, he placed 16th at the UKS Meetings. He debuted at the Polish Ski Jumping Championships in Zakopane 2000, finishing 62nd with jumps of 55 m and 48.5 m.

At the Summer Polish Championships 2002 on Średnia Krokiew, he jumped 73.5 m and 74.5 m, finishing 18th. In December, at the Winter Polish Championships 2002 on the same hill, he jumped 88 m and placed 33rd.

=== 2003/2004 ===
At the 2003 Polish Youth Olympic Days, Urbański won a bronze medal in the younger junior category with jumps of 78.5 m and 80.5 m. On 22 June, he placed 21st at the Tatra Ski Association Cup. On 9 August, he finished 20th in the McDonald's Cup. On 20 September, he placed 11th at the summer Polish Championships on a normal hill. On 26 December, he recorded his lowest career placement at the Polish Championships on a large hill, finishing 25th. In January 2004, at the Silesian Championships on Skalite, he won a silver medal with jumps of 81.5 m and 83.5 m.

On 28 January 2004, in the team event of the Polish Championships 2004 in Karpacz, he won a bronze medal with Start Krokiew Zakopane, jumping 82.5 m and 84.5 m. The following day, he placed 13th in the individual event.

On 8 February 2004, he debuted in the Continental Cup at Wielka Krokiew in Zakopane, jumping 79 m and finishing 75th. On 9 October, at the summer Polish Championships on the same hill, he jumped 115.5 m and 110.5 m, finishing 12th. The next day, on Średnia Krokiew, he achieved his career-best national championship result, finishing 9th with jumps of 80 m and 79 m.

=== 2004/2005 ===
At the Tatra Ski Association Cup on Średnia Krokiew, Urbański placed 27th, jumping 71 m and 70.5 m. At the summer Polish Championships, he finished 12th (large hill) and 9th (normal hill).

When Stefan Horngacher took over as coach of Poland's B team, Urbański began competing regularly in the Continental Cup. In mid-December, he competed in Harrachov, Czech Republic. On 17 December, he jumped 120.5 m, finishing 42nd. The next day, he jumped 114.5 m and placed 50th. On 26 December in Sankt Moritz, he jumped 77.5 m and finished 55th.

On 28 December 2004, in Engelberg, Switzerland, he won a Continental Cup event, jumping 118 m. The second round was canceled due to variable winds and heavy snow. Some coaches protested, demanding the first round's results be annulled, but the results stood. His jump earned judges' scores between 16.5 and 17.5 points. The day before, he placed 37th with a 114.5 m jump.

In the New Year's event in Seefeld, he scored points again, jumping 90 m and 86.5 m to finish 26th. A week later in Planica, he placed 36th and 48th. In Sapporo, he earned points in his final events of the season. On the first day, on a normal hill, he jumped 77.5 m and 79.5 m, finishing 27th. On the large hill, he jumped 116 m and 119.5 m for 21st place, and 119 m and 114.5 m for 14th place, earning 32 points in Japan. In subsequent events in Bischofshofen, Lauscha, and Zakopane, he placed in the 5th and 6th dozens. In the 2004–05 Continental Cup, he finished 47th overall with 137 points.

In the three winter Polish Championships that season, he placed 10th, 16th, and again 16th.

On 28 February 2005, at the Polish Youth Olympic Days in Szczyrk, he placed 5th in the junior individual event, jumping 83 m and 78.5 m. Earlier, in the team event, he won a silver medal with his club.

On 23 March, he competed in the team event at the 2005 Nordic Junior World Ski Championships in Rovaniemi, jumping 95.5 m and 90 m to help his team win a silver medal. Two days later, in the individual event, he jumped 90 m and 85.5 m, finishing 16th.

=== 2005/2006 ===
On 18 June 2005, at the Perfect Milk Cup in Zakopane, he placed 12th, jumping 110 m in both rounds. At the summer Polish Championships, he finished 15th.

In October, he competed in the US leg of the Summer Continental Cup 2005. In Park City, he jumped 122.5 m in the first round, placing 3rd, but fell to 14th after a 105 m second jump. In the next single-round event, he placed 18th. In Lake Placid, he finished 18th and 15th, ending 47th overall in the summer standings.

In November, at the FIS Cup in Sankt Moritz, he placed 12th in both events. In January, he finished 11th in Harrachov and 8th in Zakopane. In the 2005/2006 FIS Cup, he placed 47th overall with 100 points. On 26 December, at the Christmas competition in Zakopane, he placed 13th. In January, he finished 15th at the TZN Championships.

At the Polish Championships, he placed 16th on the normal hill and 15th on the large hill.

His final international competition was the Summer Continental Cup 2006 in Oberstdorf. On 29 July, he placed 33rd, and the next day, he finished 35th after a 114.5 m jump. His last Polish Championships appearance was on 17 February 2007 in Szczyrk, where he placed 16th, jumping 72.5 m and 64 m. He retired due to a lack of significant sporting success.

== Continental Cup ==
=== Overall standings ===
Season	Place
2004–05	47th

== Summer Continental Cup ==
=== Overall standings ===
Season	Place
2005	47th

== FIS Cup ==
=== Overall standings ===
Season	Place
2005–06	47th

== Polish Championships ==
=== Winter Polish Championships starts ===
Place	Date	Year	Location	Hill	K-Point	HS	Event	Jump 1	Jump 2	Score	Deficit	Winner
33.	26 December	2002	Zakopane	Wielka Krokiew	K-120	–	Individual	88.0 m	–	50.4 pts	226.4 pts	Adam Małysz
25.	26 December	2003	Zakopane	Wielka Krokiew	K-120	–	Individual	110.5 m	100.5 m	272.6 pts	111.8 pts	Adam Małysz
3.	28 January	2004	Karpacz	Orlinek	K-85	–	Team	82.5 m	84.5 m	843.5 pts (218.5 pts)	40.0 pts	AZS AWF Katowice
13.	29 January	2004	Karpacz	Orlinek	K-85	–	Individual	81.5 m	85.5 m	220.5 pts	41.5 pts	Adam Małysz
17.	31 January	2004	Zakopane	Wielka Krokiew	K-120	–	Individual	103.5 m	115.5 m	186.7 pts	91.5 pts	Adam Małysz
10.	26 January	2005	Szczyrk	Skalite	K-85	–	Individual	79.0 m	–	99.5 pts	89.0 pts	Adam Małysz
16.	8 February	2005	Zakopane	Wielka Krokiew	K-120	HS-137	Individual	97.5 m	108.5 m	160.8 pts	100.2 pts	Adam Małysz
16.	15 February	2005	Zakopane	Wielka Krokiew	K-120	HS-137	Individual	112.5 m	112.0 m	193.6 pts	83.6 pts	Adam Małysz
15.	25 February	2006	Zakopane	Wielka Krokiew	K-120	HS-137	Individual	110.5 m	111.0 m	188.7 pts	90.2 pts	Robert Mateja
16.	26 February	2006	Zakopane	Średnia Krokiew	K-85	HS-94	Individual	79.5 m	78.5 m	199.0 pts	50.5 pts	Adam Małysz
16.	17 February	2007	Szczyrk	Skalite	K-85	HS-93	Individual	72.5 m	64.0 m	144.0 pts	91.0 pts	Adam Małysz

=== Summer Polish Championships starts ===
Place	Date	Year	Location	Hill	K-Point	HS	Event	Jump 1	Jump 2	Score	Deficit	Winner
18.	29 September	2002	Zakopane	Średnia Krokiew	K-85	–	Individual	73.5 m	74.5 m	180.0 pts	64.0 pts	Marcin Bachleda
11.	20 September	2003	Zakopane	Średnia Krokiew	K-85	–	Individual	84.5 m	77.5 m	208.0 pts	31.5 pts	Mateusz Rutkowski
12.	9 October	2004	Zakopane	Wielka Krokiew	K-120	HS-137	Individual	115.5 m	110.5 m	200.3 pts	77.7 pts	Adam Małysz
9.	10 October	2004	Zakopane	Średnia Krokiew	K-85	HS-94	Individual	80.0 m	79.0 m	205.5 pts	48.5 pts	Adam Małysz
15.	16 October	2005	Zakopane	Średnia Krokiew	K-85	HS-94	Individual	75.5 m	81.5 m	196.0 pts	62.0 pts	Adam Małysz
11.	14 October	2006	Zakopane	Wielka Krokiew	K-120	HS-137	Individual	116.0 m	111.0 m	198.6 pts	63.2 pts	Adam Małysz
16.	15 October	2006	Zakopane	Średnia Krokiew	K-120	HS-137	Individual	79.0 m	77.0 m	195.0 pts	65.0 pts	Adam Małysz

=== Other achievements ===
- Polish Youth Olympic Days – Younger Juniors: Bronze medal in 2003, Juniors: 5th place in 2005, Juniors Team: Silver medal in 2005.
- Silesian Championships – Silver medal in 2004.
