= Zelená Hora =

Zelená Hora may refer to places in the Czech Republic:

- Zelená Hora (Vyškov District), a municipality and village in the South Moravian Region
- Zelená Hora Castle, a castle in the Plzeň Region
- Zelená Hora, an administrative part of Kraslice in the Karlovy Vary Region
- Zelená Hora, a village and part of Lužany (Plzeň-South District) in the Plzeň Region
- Zelená hora, a hill in the Vysočina Region, location of the Pilgrimage Church of Saint John of Nepomuk

== See also ==
- Zielona Góra, a city in Poland called Zelená Hora in Czech
