= Hraničná =

- Municipal part of Kraslice
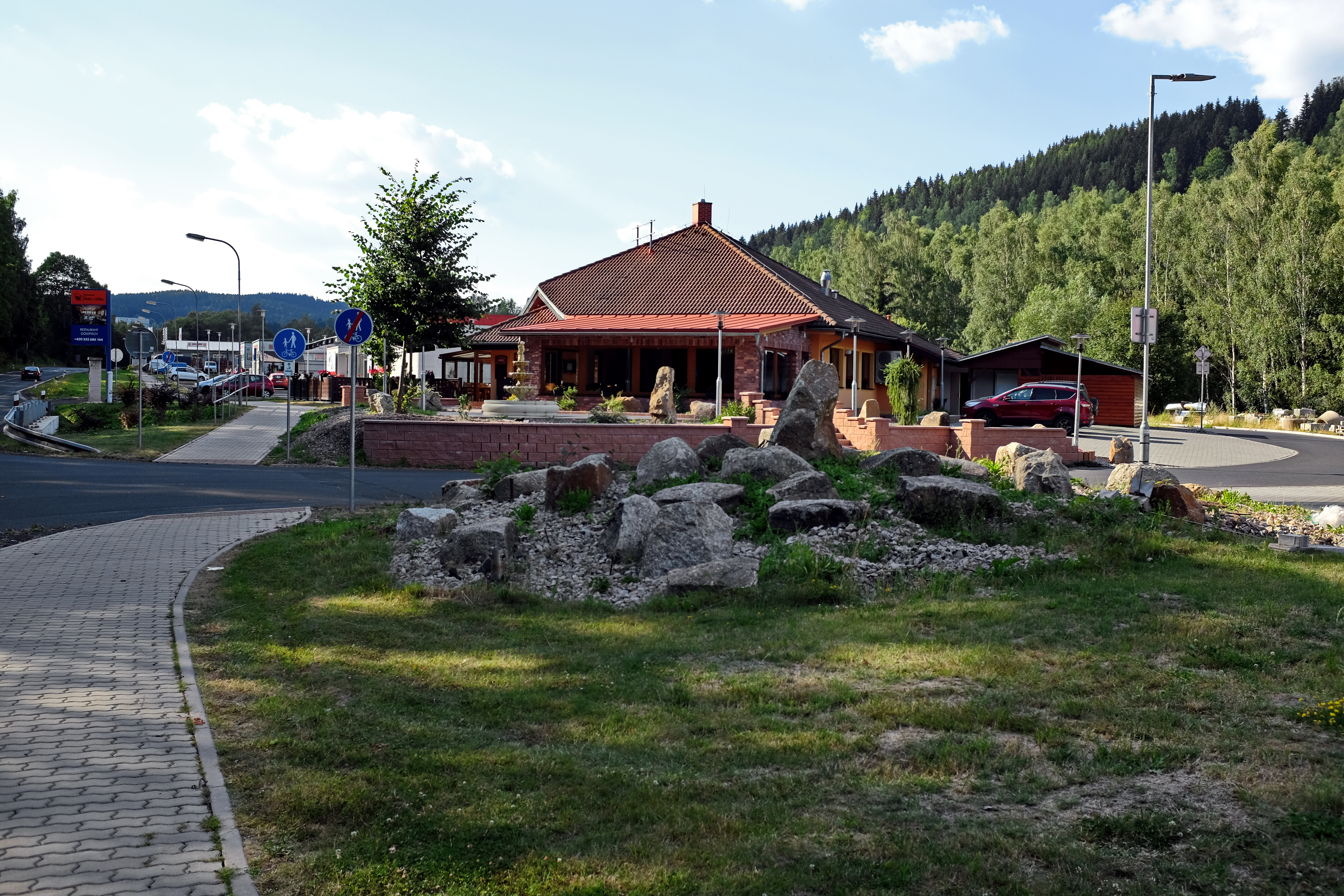
- Centre of Hraničná

- Location in the Czech Republic
- Coordinates: 50°21′6″N 12°28′19″E
- Country: Czech Republic
- Region: Karlovy Vary
- District: Sokolov
- Municipality: Kraslice
- First mentioned: 1348

Area
  - Total: 3.87 km^{2} (1.49 sq mi)
- Elevation: 545 m (1,788 ft)

Population (2021)
  - Total: 0
  - Density: 0.0/km^{2} (0.0/sq mi)
- Time zone: UTC+1 (CET)
  - Summer (DST): UTC+2 (CEST)
- Postal code: 358 01

Hraničná (German: Markhausen) is a ghost town and municipal part of Kraslice in Sokolov District in the Karlovy Vary Region of the Czech Republic.

== History ==
The settlement emerged in 13th century and belonged to Waldsassen Abbey, which colonized the area. The German name of Markhausen derives from its position at a border (or, demarcation; German Mark (border); Hausen from German Haus(house), i.e. from the fact that there are houses at a border).

The first written mention is from 1348. Successively, for roughly 250 years, the place does hardly appear historical documents.

In 1608, Markhausen was founded again and is mentioned in a 1715 map of the Elbogen District by the minister cartographer Adam Friedrich Zürner. Back then, the settlement belonged to neighbouring Krásná. The inhabitants' economy based mainly upon forgecraft, the production of wood charcoal and mining. In 1610, Markhausen became a Katastralgemeinde. In 1847, 302 people lived there in 32 houses, then living mainly from agriculture and lace production.

In 1930, Markhausen was an industrial community of 1252 inhabitants in 143 houses, of whom were 1,162 Germans, 37 Czech and 54 from other origins. There was a 4-form school, the Hraničná auxiliary fire brigade a post office, a customs office, a Gendarmerie station, a cinema, a public open air bath a factory, many craftsmen and traders. Municipal life included six registered clubs and two musical bands, frequenting the eight pubs of the village. The terrific situation at the Saxon border secured vivid commercial transit and tourism. Guests especially headed for the pubs, which hosted concerts and dances frequently. The more famous localities were the Brauner Hund (German for "brown dog"), the Schwarze Katz (German for "black cat") and the Reichsgrenze (German for "Empire's border").

In 1946, the German inhabitants were expelled and the municipality was repopulated from within central Czechoslovakia. In 1955, the demolition of the village was started to establish an uninhabited border strip. Until 1967, trespassing was strictly prohibited.

== Geography ==
Hraničná is situated in the northern part of Kraslice along the Svatava river in the west of the Ore Mountains. It lies on the Czech–German border and is adjacent to Klingenthal.

== Demographics ==
Historical population

Year	Pop.	±%
1869	467	—
1880	615	+31.7%
1890	950	+54.5%
1900	1,137	+19.7%
1910	1,453	+27.8%

Year	Pop.	±%
1921	1,218	−16.2%
1930	1,253	+2.9%
1950	175	−86.0%
1961	0	−100.0%
1970	0	0.00%

Year	Pop.	±%
1980	0	0.00%
1991	0	0.00%
2001	0	0.00%
2011	0	0.00%
2021	0	0.00%

Source: Censuses
