= Oloví =

- Town
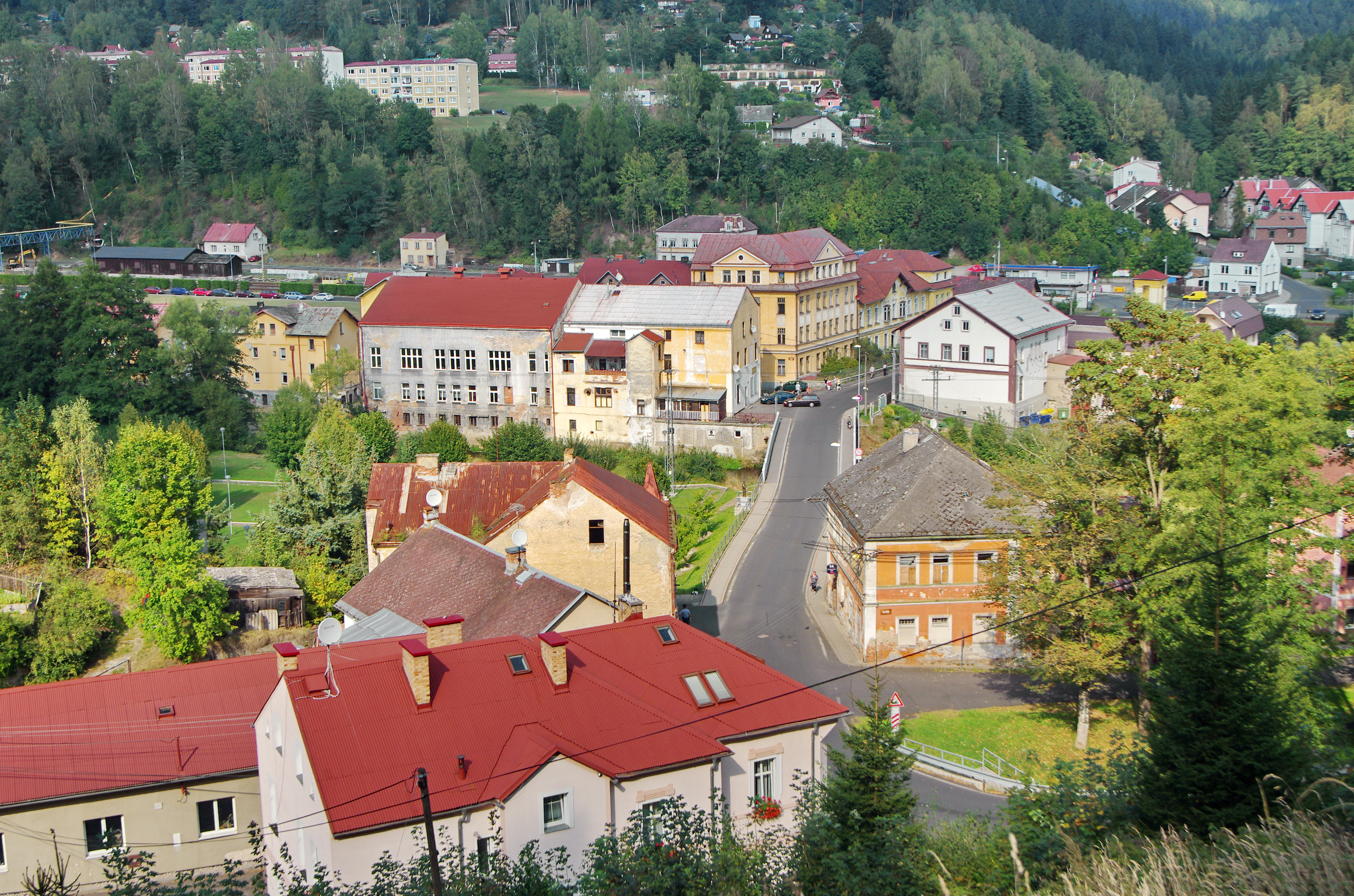
- View from the southwest

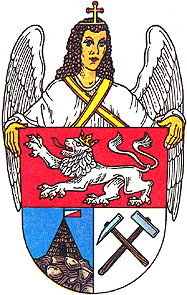
- Coat of arms

- Location in the Czech Republic
- Coordinates: 50°14′44″N 12°33′3″E
- Country: Czech Republic
- Region: Karlovy Vary
- District: Sokolov
- Founded: 1523

Government
  - Mayor: Jiří Mikuláš

Area
  - Total: 19.05 km^{2} (7.36 sq mi)
- Elevation: 528 m (1,732 ft)

Population (2026-01-01)
  - Total: 1,618
  - Density: 84.93/km^{2} (220.0/sq mi)
- Time zone: UTC+1 (CET)
  - Summer (DST): UTC+2 (CEST)
- Postal code: 357 07
- Website: www.olovi.cz

Oloví (Czech pronunciation: [ˈoloviː]; German: Bleistadt) is a town in Sokolov District in the Karlovy Vary Region of the Czech Republic. It has about 1,600 inhabitants. The town is located on the Svatava River in the Ore Mountains.

Oloví was founded in 1523 as a mining town and for more than a hundred years it was known for lead mining. The main landmark of the town is the Church of Saint Michael the Archangel.

== Administrative division ==
Oloví consists of four municipal parts (in brackets population according to the 2021 census):

- Oloví (689)
- Hory (786)
- Nové Domy (15)
- Studenec (67)

== Etymology ==
Both the Czech name Oloví and German name Bleistadt refer to the reason for the founding of the town, which was lead mining ('lead' = olovo in Czech and Blei in German).

== Geography ==
Oloví is located about 10 kilometres (6 mi) northwest of Sokolov and 21 km (13 mi) west of Karlovy Vary. It lies in the western part of the Ore Mountains. The highest point is at 681 m (2,234 ft) above sea level. The Svatava River flows through the town.

== History ==
Oloví was founded by Stephan Schlick in 1523 within his newly acquired Hartenberg estate. Since its foundation, lead and to a lesser extent silver were mined in the area. After the properties of the Schlick family were confiscated by King Ferdinand I, the estate was acquired by the Lords of Plauen in 1551. In 1561, Ferdinand I separated Oloví from the Hartenberg estate and promoted it to a royal mining town. Because of the Thirty Years' War, the collapsing of tunnels and floods on the Svatava River, mining was reduced.

From 1938 to 1945, the town was annexed by Nazi Germany and administered as part of the Reichsgau Sudetenland. After World War II, the German-speaking population was expelled.

== Demographics ==
Historical population

Year	Pop.	±%
1869	2,177	—
1880	2,194	+0.8%
1890	1,898	−13.5%
1900	2,472	+30.2%
1910	3,664	+48.2%

Year	Pop.	±%
1921	3,396	−7.3%
1930	3,589	+5.7%
1950	1,684	−53.1%
1961	1,943	+15.4%
1970	2,266	+16.6%

Year	Pop.	±%
1980	2,146	−5.3%
1991	1,783	−16.9%
2001	1,901	+6.6%
2011	1,741	−8.4%
2021	1,557	−10.6%

Source: Censuses

== Transport ==
Oloví is located on the railway line Sokolov–Kraslice.

== Sights ==
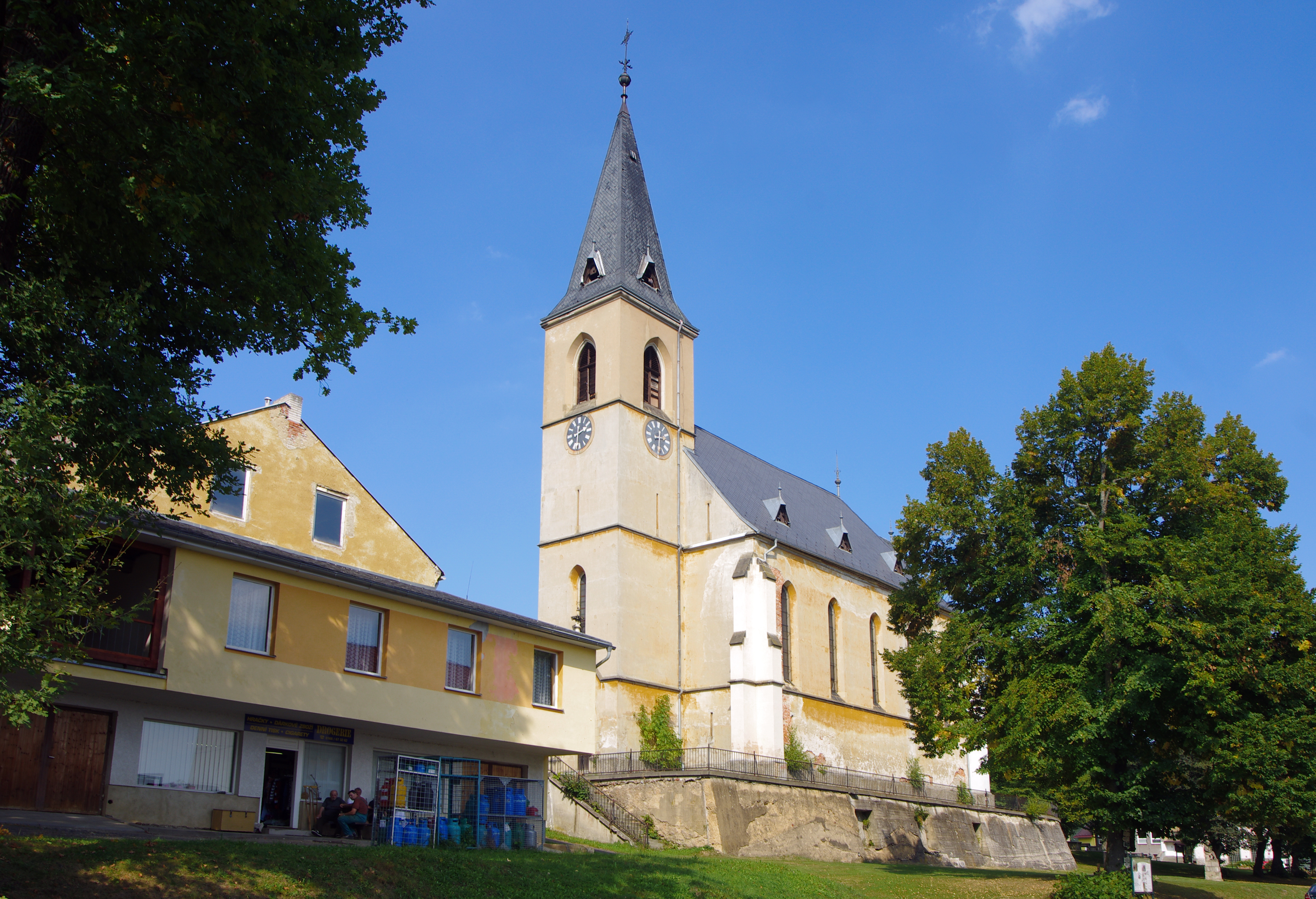
Church of Saint Michael the Archangel

The main landmark of Oloví is the Church of Saint Michael the Archangel. It was built in the neo-Gothic style in 1901–1902.

== Twin towns – sister cities ==
Oloví is twinned with:

- Kastl, Germany
