= Uebel =

Uebel or Übel or Ubel may refer to:

== People ==
- Brandon Ubel (born 1991), American professional basketball player
- Ernst Uebel (1882 - 1959), German composer and musician
- Lars Uebel (born 1980) German tennis player and coach
- Michael Uebel (born 1964), American psychotherapist
- Thomas Uebel (born 1952), Austrian philosopher of science

== Other ==
- F. Arthur Uebel, German clarinet maker
- Übel Blatt, a 2004 Japanese manga series
