= Roland Bauer =

German politician (1928–2017)

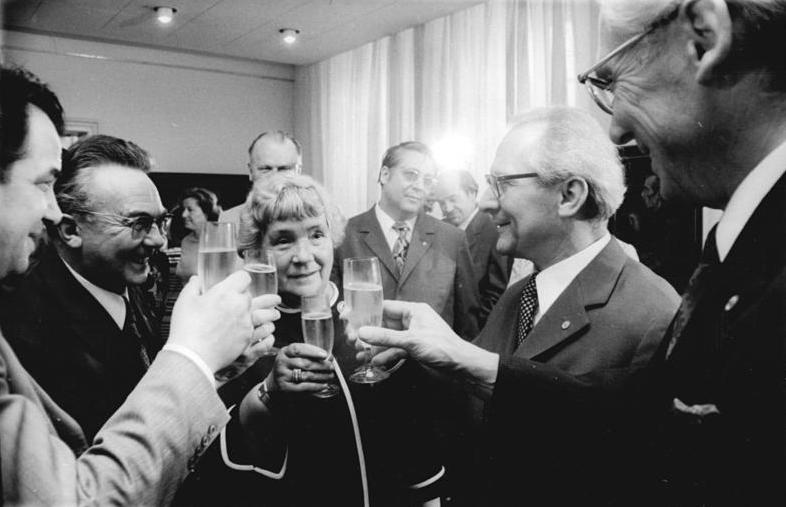
- Bauer (far left) in 1973
- Born: 19 March 1928; Eibenberg, Czechoslovakia
- Died: 2017 (aged 88–89)
- Occupation: Politician / Academic
- Political party: SED

Roland Bauer (19 March 1928 – 2017) was a German politician and history academic in the German Democratic Republic (East Germany).

He was vice-president of the East German Historical Society, a member of the central committee of the country's ruling SED (party) and of the Berlin city council.

== Life ==
Roland Bauer was born into a working-class family in Eibenberg in the extreme west of Czechoslovakia (today Tisová, part of Kraslice in the Czech Republic). His family was part of the large German speaking minority that had settled the area in the centuries before the creation of Czechoslovakia in 1918 from a part of what had hitherto been Austria-Hungary. On leaving secondary school he undertook an apprenticeship as a watchmaker and jeweler. That lasted till 1944 when he was enlisted for National Labour Service ("Reichsarbeitsdienst").

Although he was born in a frontier region, while he was growing up Bauer's family lived in Grünberg in the centre of Czechoslovakia, where his parents were members of the Communist Party, Roland Bauer himself was a member of the Communist "Pioneer" organisation from 1934 till 1938. As a communist party member Bauer's father was interned by the Germans in concentration camps, first in Dachau and later in Mauthausen.

The war ended in May 1945 and Roland Bauer, together with his parents, were among the millions of ethnic Germans who found themselves relocated. They settled in the Soviet Occupation Zone (SBZ / Sowjetische Besatzungszone) of what had been Germany, fetching up in the heart of Thuringia, near Weimar.

Bauer joined the Free German Youth (FDJ / Freie Deutsche Jugend) and in 1946 joined the newly formed SED (party), then in the process of becoming the country's ruling party, endorsed by the occupying forces, Till 1947 Bauer worked as a watchmaker in Apolda, taking a leading position with the FDJ locally. In 1947 he undertook a training at the party's regional college for Thuringia in Bad Berka, and between 1947 and 1949 he was the party's district youth secretary for the Weimar district.

In 1949 Bauer embarked on a two-year study period at The Party's Karl Marx Academy, after which he went on to become successively an assistant, a teacher and then deputy head of the History department. Between 1954 and 1958 he undertook postgraduate study at the Institute for Social Sciences run by the Communist Party Central Committee in Moscow. He received his doctorate for a dissertation entitled "Precondidions and Groundrules for the November 1918 Revolution in Germany (Stage 1)" ("Voraussetzungen und Grundzüge der Novemberrevolution 1918 in Deutschland – 1. Etappe)"), From 1958 till 1962 Roland Bauer was a member of the management team at the Karl Marx Academy, after which he became its deputy head.

From 1962 till 1964, in succession to Ludwig Einicke, Bauer served as Director of the Party Central Committee's Institute for Marxism–Leninism in Berlin. Also between 1962 and 1964 he served as vice-president of the East German Historical Society. From 1964 till 1967 he served as the party's regional secretary for Agitation and Propaganda in Berlin, and at the same time, taking over from the journalist Erich Selbmann he also headed up The party's Ideological Commission. Between 1967 and 1978 Bauer served the Berlin region as Party Secretary for Science, popular education and training, a position in which he was succeeded, on 12 June 1978, by Horst Oswald.

A switch towards the national political mainstream came with his candidature for the central committee of the ruling SED (party), which lasted from 1967. He was elected to membership following the conventional waiting period at the 8th Party Congress in 1971. From 1971 till 1978 he was a member of the Party Central Committee's Culture Commission and he was also, from 1971 till 1981 a member of the Berlin City Council. In 1976 he was involved in the exclusion from East German citizenship of Wolf Biermann.

In 1978 Bauer succeeded Rudolf Wettengel as the East German Party's Central Committee representative on the editorial board of the politically important Prague based journal Problems of Peace and Socialism (World Marxist Review / Проблемы мира и социализма), remaining on the board till August 1990 representing the SED and then its successor party, the German Party of Democratic Socialism (PDS / Partei des Demokratischen Sozialismus) through most of the period of the German reunification process.

Roland Bauer went into retirement, still living in Berlin, in August 1990, In May 1991 he resigned from the PDS (party). Later he worked with Wolfgang Harich on the "Alternative Commission of Enquiry into the History of the German Democratic Republic".

== Awards and honours ==
- 1975 Medal of Merit from the Interior Ministry
- 1975 Battle Order for Services to People and Fatherland
- 1978 Patriotic Order of Merit
- 1988 Patriotic Order of Merit Gold clasp

== Publications ==
- Die II. Internationale (1889–1914). Berlin 1956, DNB 450262847.
- Der wissenschaftliche Sozialismus und das Godesberger Grundsatzprogramm. Berlin 1960, DNB 450262863.
- Kriegspolitik und Friedenskampf. Berlin 1963, DNB 450262855.
- Roland Bauer et al.: Berlin – 800 Jahre Geschichte in Wort und Bild. Dietz, Berlin 1980, DNB 810456710.
- Roland Bauer et al.: Berlin – Illustrierte Chronik bis 1870. Dietz, Berlin 1987, ISBN 3-320-00831-5, DNB 551475684.
