= Joanna Sulej =

Polish figure skater

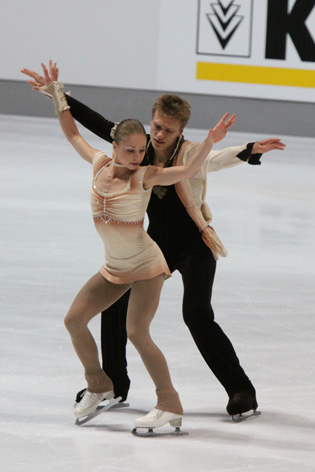
- Sulej & Chruściński in 2009

Personal information
- Full name: Joanna Sulej
- Born: 16 September 1989 (age 36) Łosice
- Home town: Oświęcim
- Height: 1.62 m (5 ft 4 in)

Figure skating career
- Country: Poland
- Skating club: Unia Dwory

Joanna Sulej (born 16 September 1989 in Łosice) is a Polish figure skater who competed as both a single skater and pair skater.

As a single skater, she was the 2005 and 2006 Polish junior national champion. She teamed up with Mateusz Chruściński to compete in pairs in 2008 and they began competing together in the 2008–2009 season. They represented Poland at the 2010 Winter Olympics.

== Programs ==
=== Pairs career ===
Season	Short program	Free skating	Exhibition
2009–2010	Scent of a Woman (soundtrack) by Thomas Newman	Romeo and Juliet (soundtrack) by Nino Rota	
2008–2009			

== Competitive highlights ==
=== Pairs career ===
(with Chruściński)

Event	2008–2009	2009–2010
Winter Olympics		18th
World Championships	19th	15th
European Championships	15th	14th
Nebelhorn Trophy		10th
JGP U.K.	14th	
Polish Championships	1st	1st

=== Singles career ===
Season	2003–04	2004–05	2005–06
JGP Romania		18th	
JGP Ukraine		22nd	
Toruń Cup	2nd J.		
Warsaw Cup		3rd J.	3rd J.
Polish Championships		1st J.	1st J.
Polish Youth Olympic Days	7th J.	2nd	1st J.
