= Kateřina Zohnová =

Czech basketball player

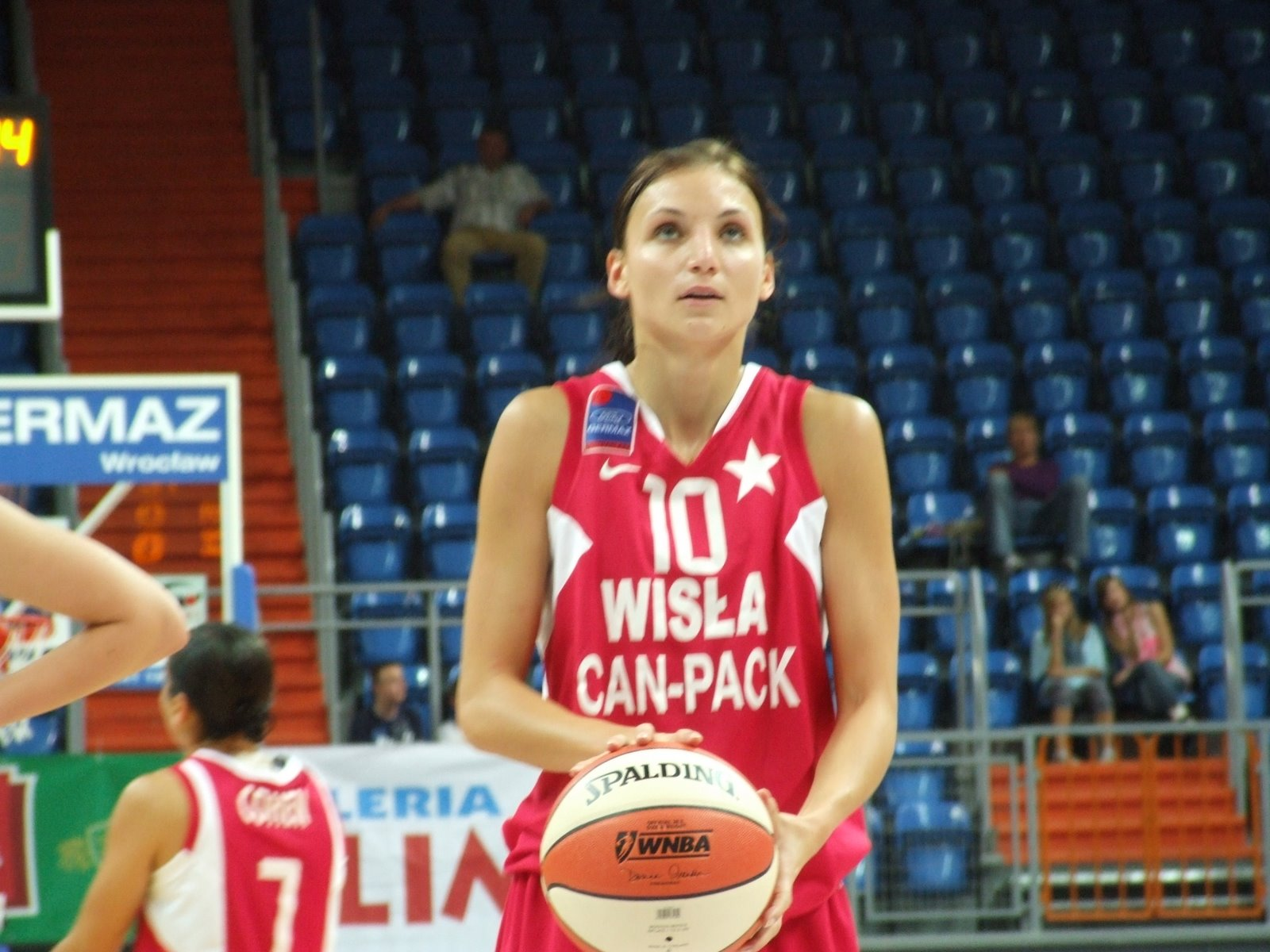

Personal information
- Nationality: Czech Republic
- Born: 7 November 1984 (age 41) Kraslice, Czechoslovakia
- Height: 179 cm (5 ft 10 in)
- Website: www.katerinazohnova.com

Sport
- Sport: Basketball
- Club: USO Mondeville

Kateřina Zohnová (Czech pronunciation: [ˈkatɛr̝ɪna ˈtsoːnovaː]; born 7 November 1984) is a Czech female basketball player. At the 2012 Summer Olympics, she competed for the Czech Republic women's national basketball team in the women's event. She is 5 ft 10 inches tall.
