= Ernst Mosch =

- Born: 7 November 1925; Svatava, Czechoslovakia
- Died: 15 May 1999 (aged 73) Germaringen, Germany
- Genres: Volksmusik
- Occupation: Conductor
- Instrument: Trombone
- Years active: 1956–1999
- Website: www.mosch-musikverlag.eu

Ernst Mosch (7 November 1925 – 15 May 1999) was a German musician, composer and conductor. He was the conductor of his own Original Egerländer Musikanten. Mosch died on 15 May 1999 at the age of 73.

== Compositions ==
- Der Falkenauer (march)
- Ein Lied aus der Heimat (waltz)
- Dompfaff (polka)
- Egerländer Musikantenmarsch
- Saazer Hopfen (polka)
- Bis bald auf Wiederseh'n (polka)
- Wir sind Kinder von der Eger (polka)
- Sterne der Heimat (polka)
- Du, nur Du (polka)
- Mondschein an der Eger (waltz)
- Böhmischer Wind (waltz)
- Die Musik, die geht uns ins Blut (polka)
