= Marte Elden =

Norwegian cross-country skier

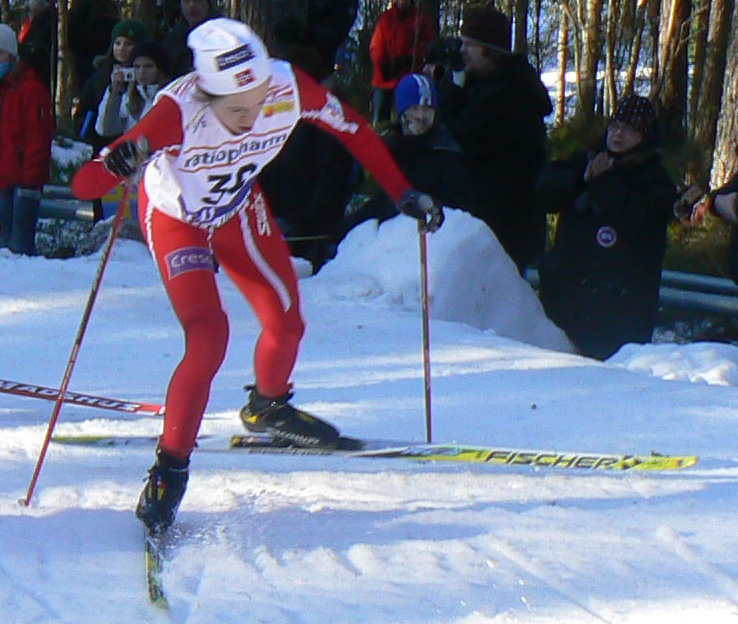

Personal information
- Nationality: Norway
- Born: 4 July 1986 (age 40) Levanger, Norway

Sport
- Sport: Skiing
- Club: Henning SL

World Cup career
- Seasons: 5 – (2006, 2008–2011)
- Indiv. starts: 33
- Indiv. podiums: 1
- Indiv. wins: 0
- Team starts: 5
- Team podiums: 0
- Overall titles: 0 – (20th in 2011)
- Discipline titles: 0
Medal record
Women's cross-country skiing
Representing Norway
U23 World Championships
Bronze medal – third place	2009 Praz de Lys-Sommand	15 km skiathlon
Junior World Championships
Gold medal – first place	2005 Rovaniemi	15 km skiathlon
Gold medal – first place	2005 Rovaniemi	4 × 5 km relay
Gold medal – first place	2006 Kranj	4 × 3.33 km relay

Marte Elden (born 4 July 1986, in Levanger) is a Norwegian cross-country skier who competed between 2005 and 2011.

== Cross-country skiing ==
She won a gold medal at the 2005 Junior World Championship. She made her World Cup debut on 19 November 2005 in Beitostølen, and collected her first World Cup points with a 22nd place on 9 February 2008 in Otepää. She finished among the top ten for the first time on 23 February 2008 in Falun, with a tenth place. She represents the sports club Henning SL, and lives in Namdalseid.

== Athletics ==
Elden finished sixth in the 800 metres and fourth in the 1500 metres in the 2003 European Youth Summer Olympic Festival, and competed without reaching the final at the 2004 World Junior Championships in Athletics. Her personal best time in the 800 metres was 2:06.77 minutes, achieved in July 2003 in Gothenburg. In the 1500 metres she had 4:25.06 minutes, achieved in July 2002 in Stockholm. She represented Namdalseid IL and Steinkjer FIK.

== Cross-country skiing results ==
All results are sourced from the International Ski Federation (FIS).

=== World Cup ===
==== Season standings ====
Season	Age	Discipline standings			Ski Tour standings		
Season	Age	Overall	Distance	Sprint	Nordic Opening	Tour de Ski	World Cup Final
2006	19	NC	NC	—	—N/a	—N/a	—N/a
2008	21	53	30	—	—N/a	—	42
2009	22	81	53	NC	—N/a	—	32
2010	23	86	60	—	—N/a	—	—
2011	24	20	18	88	—	9	23

==== Individual podiums ====
- 1 podium – (1 SWC)

No.	Season	Date	Location	Race	Level	Place
1	2010–11	9 January 2011	Val di Fiemme, Italy	9 km Pursuit F	Stage World Cup	2nd
