= Kari Vikhagen Gjeitnes =

Norwegian cross-country skier

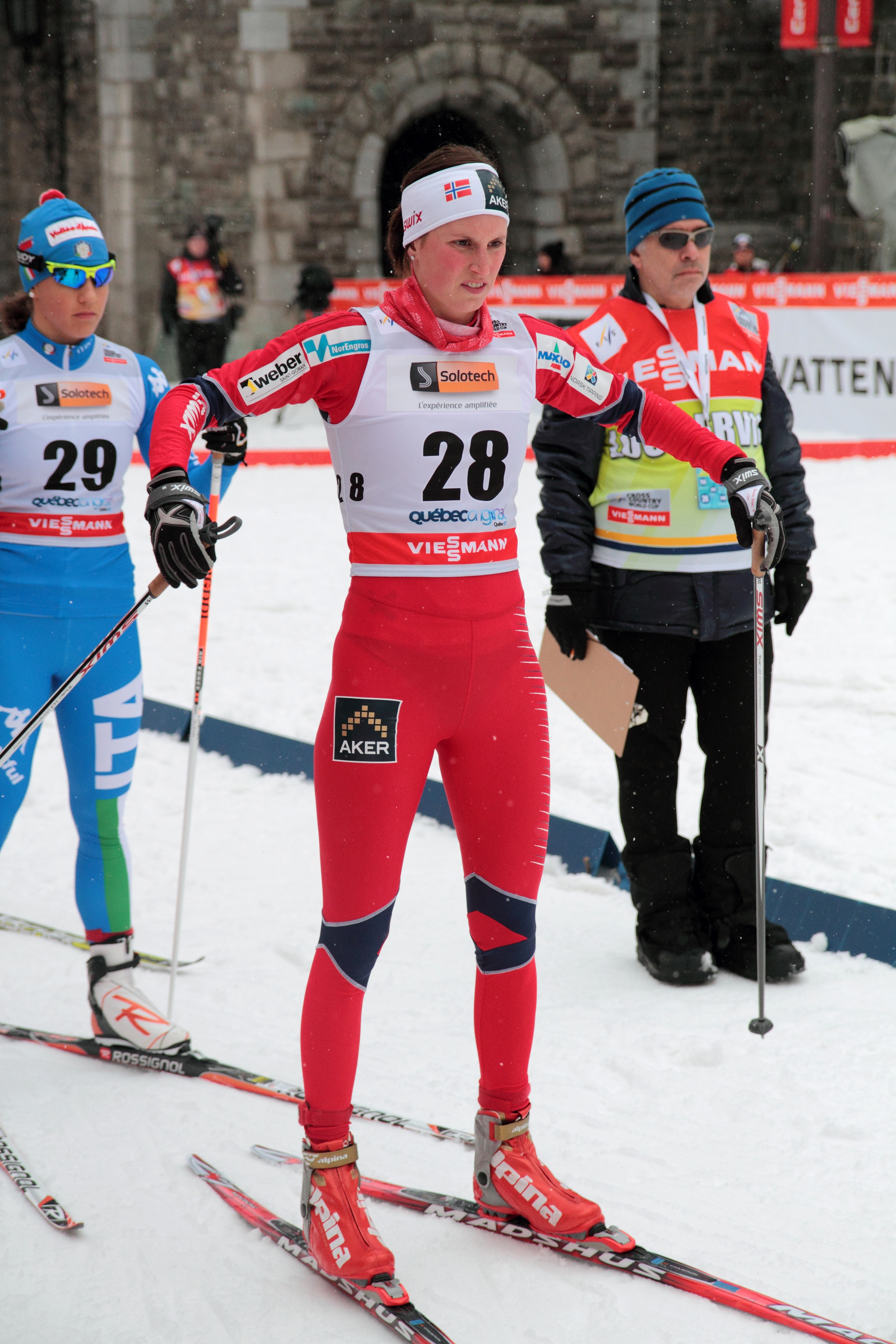
- Vikhagen Gjeitnes in 2012

Personal information
- Nationality: Norway
- Born: January 13, 1985 (age 41) Molde, Norway

Sport
- Sport: Skiing
- Club: Henning SL

World Cup career
- Seasons: 13 – (2005–2017)
- Indiv. starts: 73
- Indiv. podiums: 0
- Team starts: 12
- Team podiums: 1
- Team wins: 0
- Overall titles: 0 – (46th in 2015)
- Discipline titles: 0
Medal record
Women's cross-country skiing
Representing Norway
Junior World Championships
Gold medal – first place	2005 Rovaniemi	Individual sprint

Kari Vikhagen Gjeitnes (born 13 January 1985) is a Norwegian cross-country skier.

She won a gold medal at the 2005 Junior World ski championships, made her World Cup debut in March 2005 in Drammen, and collected her first World Cup points with a 15th place the next year in the same city. She finished among the top ten for the first time in February 2008 in Otepää, and repeated that result in March 2009 in Trondheim.

She represents the sports club Henning SL, and lives at Skåla in Molde Municipality.

== Cross-country skiing results ==
All results are sourced from the International Ski Federation (FIS).

=== World Championships ===
Year	Age	10 km individual	15 km skiathlon	30 km mass start	Sprint	4 × 5 km relay	Team sprint
2015	30	—	—	—	5	—	—

=== World Cup ===
==== Season standings ====
Season	Age	Discipline standings			Ski Tour standings			
Season	Age	Overall	Distance	Sprint	Nordic Opening	Tour de Ski	World Cup Final	Ski Tour Canada
2005	20	NC	—	NC	—N/a	—N/a	—N/a	—N/a
2006	21	83	—	51	—N/a	—N/a	—N/a	—N/a
2007	22	NC	—	NC	—N/a	—	—N/a	—N/a
2008	23	49	—	32	—N/a	—	—	—N/a
2009	24	65	NC	42	—N/a	—	—	—N/a
2010	25	62	—	32	—N/a	—	—	—N/a
2011	26	67	NC	44	DNF	—	—	—N/a
2012	27	69	—	45	—	—	—	—N/a
2013	28	57	72	33	—	—	42	—N/a
2014	29	62	65	45	22	—	—	—N/a
2015	30	46	NC	16	48	—	—N/a	—N/a
2016	31	56	48	44	—	—	—N/a	—
2017	32	61	88	35	28	—	—	—N/a

==== Team podiums ====
- 1 podium – (1 TS)

No.	Season	Date	Location	Race	Level	Place	Teammate
1	2010–11	16 January 2011	Liberec, Czech Republic	6 × 1.3 km Team Sprint C	World Cup	3rd	Brun-Lie
