= Zum Friedefürsten Church =

Church in Klingenthal, Saxony

Coordinates: 50°21′28″N 12°28′02″E

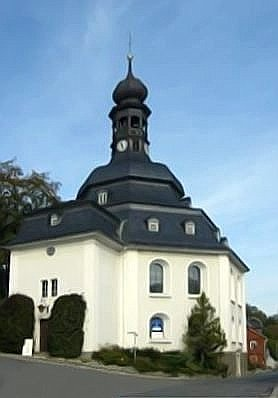
Rundkirche zum Friedefürsten

The Zum Friedefürsten Church (German: Rundkirche zum Friedefürsten) is a baroque Lutheran round church in Klingenthal, Saxony, south-eastern Germany. It has an octagonal floorplan and is the largest of its kind in Saxony. The church is the most important historical monument in Klingenthal and dominates the town centre. The church was officially finished in 1737.
