= Henning SL =

Norwegian skiing club

Logo.

Henning Skilag is a Norwegian skiing club from the village of Henning in Steinkjer Municipality.

Members include cross-country skiers Kari Vikhagen Gjeitnes, Karianne Bjellånes, Marte Elden, Tor Arne Brevik, and Morten Eilifsen.

Local rival teams are Steinkjer SK and Skogn IL.
