= Karianne Bjellånes =

Norwegian cross-country skier

Personal information
- Full name: Karianne Gåsland Bjellånes
- Nationality: Norway
- Born: 9 August 1986 (age 39) Mo i Rana, Norway

Sport
- Sport: Skiing
- Club: Henning SL

World Cup career
- Seasons: 5 – (2007–2011)
- Indiv. starts: 19
- Indiv. podiums: 0
- Team starts: 2
- Team podiums: 0
- Overall titles: 0 – (51st in 2010)
- Discipline titles: 0
Medal record
Women's cross-country skiing
Representing Norway
U23 World Championships
Gold medal – first place	2009 Praz de Lys-Sommand	Individual sprint
- Updated on 9 March 2019

Karianne Gåsland Bjellånes (born 9 August 1986 in Mo i Rana, Helgeland) is a Norwegian cross-country skier. She represents Henning SL, and lives in Trondheim.

She made her World Cup debut in March 2007 in Drammen, and collected her first World Cup points in that race with a 27th place. She finished among the top fifteen for the first time in February 2008 in Stockholm, with a 13th place; and finished eleventh in March 2008 in Drammen.

== Cross-country skiing results ==
All results are sourced from the International Ski Federation (FIS).

=== World Cup ===
==== Season standings ====
Season	Age	Discipline standings			Ski Tour standings		
Season	Age	Overall	Distance	Sprint	Nordic Opening	Tour de Ski	World Cup Final
2007	20	107	—	78	—N/a	—	—N/a
2008	21	52	NC	36	—N/a	—	—
2009	22	114	—	76	—N/a	—	—
2010	23	51	—	21	—N/a	—	—
2011	24	NC	—	NC	—	—	—
