= Mikhail Devyatyarov Jr. =

Russian cross-country skier

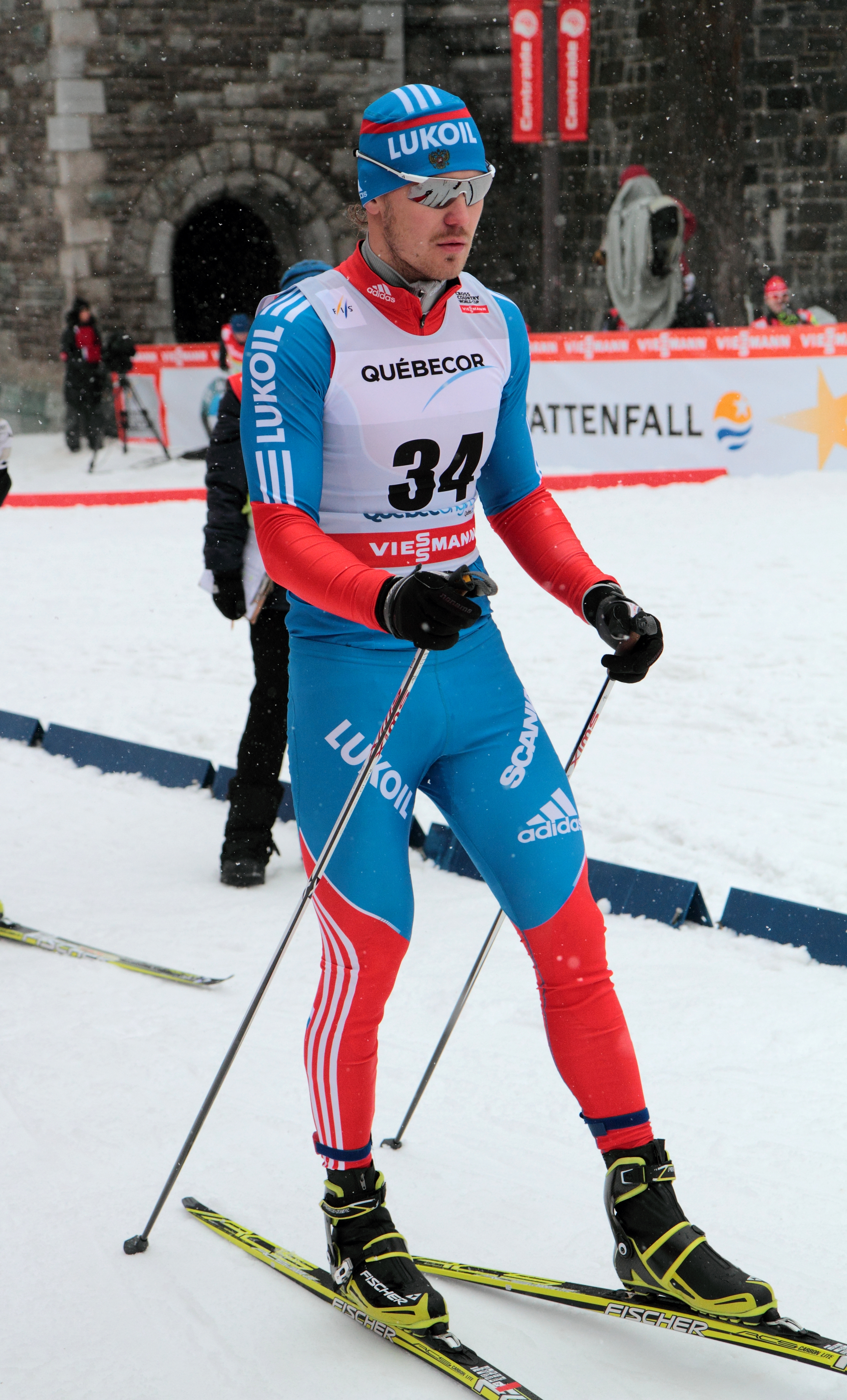
- Devyatyarov at a world cup-event in Quebec in 2012

Personal information
- Nationality: Russia
- Born: 11 November 1985 (age 40) Chusovoy, Soviet Union

Sport
- Sport: Skiing

World Cup career
- Seasons: 13 – (2004–2016)
- Indiv. starts: 49
- Indiv. podiums: 1
- Indiv. wins: 1
- Team starts: 9
- Team podiums: 1
- Team wins: 1
- Overall titles: 0 – (40th in 2007)
- Discipline titles: 0
Medal record
Men's cross-country skiing
Representing Russia
Junior World Championships
Gold medal – first place	2005 Rovaniemi	4 × 10 km relay
Bronze medal – third place	2005 Rovaniemi	20 km skiathlon

Mikhail Devyatyarov Jr. (born 11 November 1985 in Chusovoy, Perm Krai) is a Russian cross-country skier who competed between 2003 and 2017. At the 2010 Winter Olympics in Vancouver, he finished eighth in the individual sprint event.

Devyatyarov also finished 15th in the individual sprint at the FIS Nordic World Ski Championships 2007 in Sapporo.

His lone world cup victory was in a sprint event at Stockholm in 2007.

He is the son of Mikhail Devyatyarov, who competed for the Soviet Union and Russia from 1982 to 1992, winning gold in the 15 km event at the 1988 Winter Olympics in Calgary.

== Cross-country skiing results ==
All results are sourced from the International Ski Federation (FIS).

=== Olympic Games ===
Year	Age	15 km individual	30 km skiathlon	50 km mass start	Sprint	4 × 10 km relay	Team sprint
2010	24	—	—	—	8	—	—

=== World Championships ===
Year	Age	15 km individual	30 km skiathlon	50 km mass start	Sprint	4 × 10 km relay	Team sprint
2007	21	—	—	—	15	—	—
2011	25	—	—	—	19	—	—
2013	27	—	—	—	22	—	—

=== World Cup ===
==== Season standings ====
Season	Age	Discipline standings			Ski Tour standings			
Season	Age	Overall	Distance	Sprint	Nordic Opening	Tour de Ski	World Cup Final	Ski Tour Canada
2004	18	NC	—	NC	—N/a	—N/a	—N/a	—N/a
2005	19	130	—	66	—N/a	—N/a	—N/a	—N/a
2006	20	100	—	42	—N/a	—N/a	—N/a	—N/a
2007	21	40	—	17	—N/a	—	—N/a	—N/a
2008	22	47	—	17	—N/a	—	—	—N/a
2009	23	NC	—	NC	—N/a	—	—	—N/a
2010	24	65	—	22	—N/a	—	—	—N/a
2011	25	77	—	37	—	—	—	—N/a
2012	26	140	—	84	—	—	—	—N/a
2013	27	73	—	33	—	—	—	—N/a
2014	28	NC	—	NC	—	—	—	—N/a
2015	29	108	—	54	—	—	—N/a	—N/a
2016	30	141	NC	93	—	—	—N/a	—

==== Individual podiums ====
- 1 victory
- 1 podium

No.	Season	Date	Location	Race	Level	Place
1	2006–07	21 March 2007	Stockholm, Sweden	1.0 km Sprint C	World Cup	1st

==== Team podiums ====
- 1 victory
- 1 podium

No.	Season	Date	Location	Race	Level	Place	Teammate
5	2012–13	13 January 2013	Liberec, Czech Republic	6 × 1.6 km Team Sprint F	World Cup	1st	Morilov
