= Svatava (Sokolov District) =

- Market town
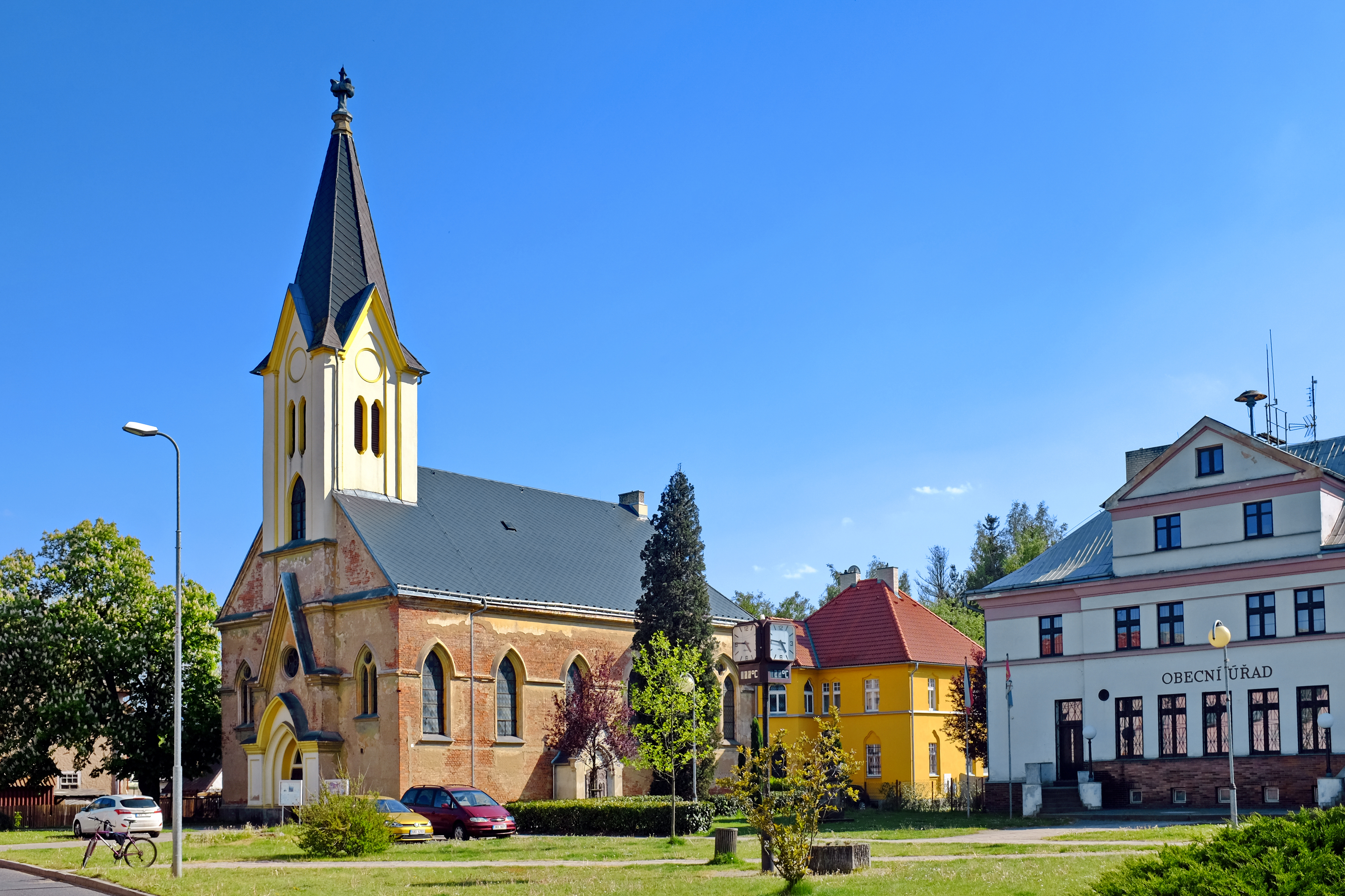
- Centre of Svatava

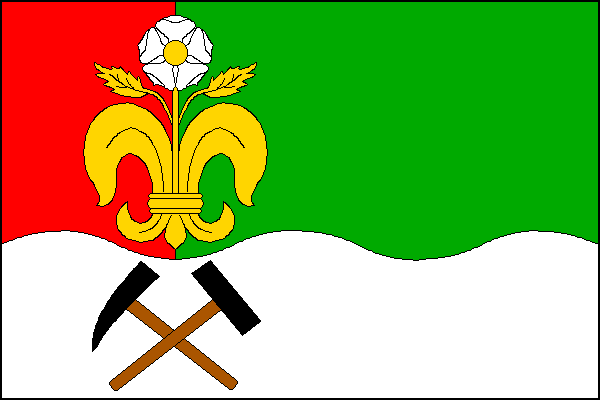
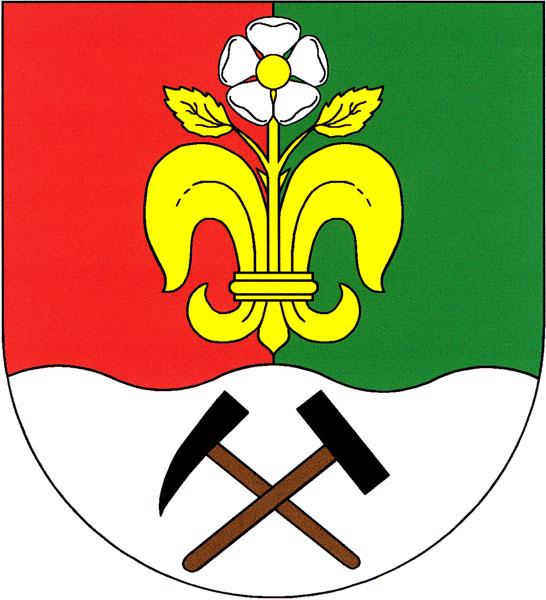
- Flag Coat of arms

- Location in the Czech Republic
- Coordinates: 50°11′32″N 12°37′31″E
- Country: Czech Republic
- Region: Karlovy Vary
- District: Sokolov
- First mentioned: 1391

Area
  - Total: 11.59 km^{2} (4.47 sq mi)
- Elevation: 407 m (1,335 ft)

Population (2026-01-01)
  - Total: 1,593
  - Density: 137.4/km^{2} (356.0/sq mi)
- Time zone: UTC+1 (CET)
  - Summer (DST): UTC+2 (CEST)
- Postal code: 357 03
- Website: www.mestyssvatava.cz

Svatava (Czech pronunciation: [ˈsvatava]; German: Zwodau) is a market town in Sokolov District in the Karlovy Vary Region of the Czech Republic. It has about 1,600 inhabitants.

== Etymology ==
The settlement was named after the Svatava River.

== Geography ==
Svatava is located about 2 kilometres (1 mi) northwest of Sokolov and 17 km (11 mi) west of Karlovy Vary. The municipal territory lies mostly in the Sokolov Basin, only the northern part extends into the Ore Mountains and includes the highest point of Svatava, the hill Svatavský vrch at 508 m (1,667 ft) above sea level. The Svatava River flows through the market town. Half of Medard Lake is situated in Svatava's territory.

== History ==
The first written mention of Svatava is in a document of King Wenceslaus IV from 1391. Until 1789, it was an insignificant agricultural village. From 1789, lignite mining began to develop. In 1903, Svatava was promoted to a market town.

During World War II, Svatava was occupied by Germany. In 1943, the occupiers established a slave labour camp, which in September 1944 became a subcamp of the Flossenbürg concentration camp. 1,350 women of various nationalities were imprisoned there. In April 1945, over 1,000 women reached the subcamp following death marches from other subcamps. The surviving prisoners were liberated by American troops on 7 May 1945.

The lignite mining ceased in 2000 and the Medard mine was reclaimed to the lake.

== Demographics ==
Historical population

Year	Pop.	±%
1869	1,038	—
1880	1,663	+60.2%
1890	2,503	+50.5%
1900	4,410	+76.2%
1910	5,269	+19.5%

Year	Pop.	±%
1921	5,528	+4.9%
1930	5,879	+6.3%
1950	3,793	−35.5%
1961	2,943	−22.4%
1970	2,083	−29.2%

Year	Pop.	±%
1980	1,972	−5.3%
1991	1,464	−25.8%
2001	1,577	+7.7%
2011	1,670	+5.9%
2021	1,646	−1.4%

Source: Censuses

== Transport ==
Svatava is located on the railway line Sokolov–Kraslice.

== Sights ==
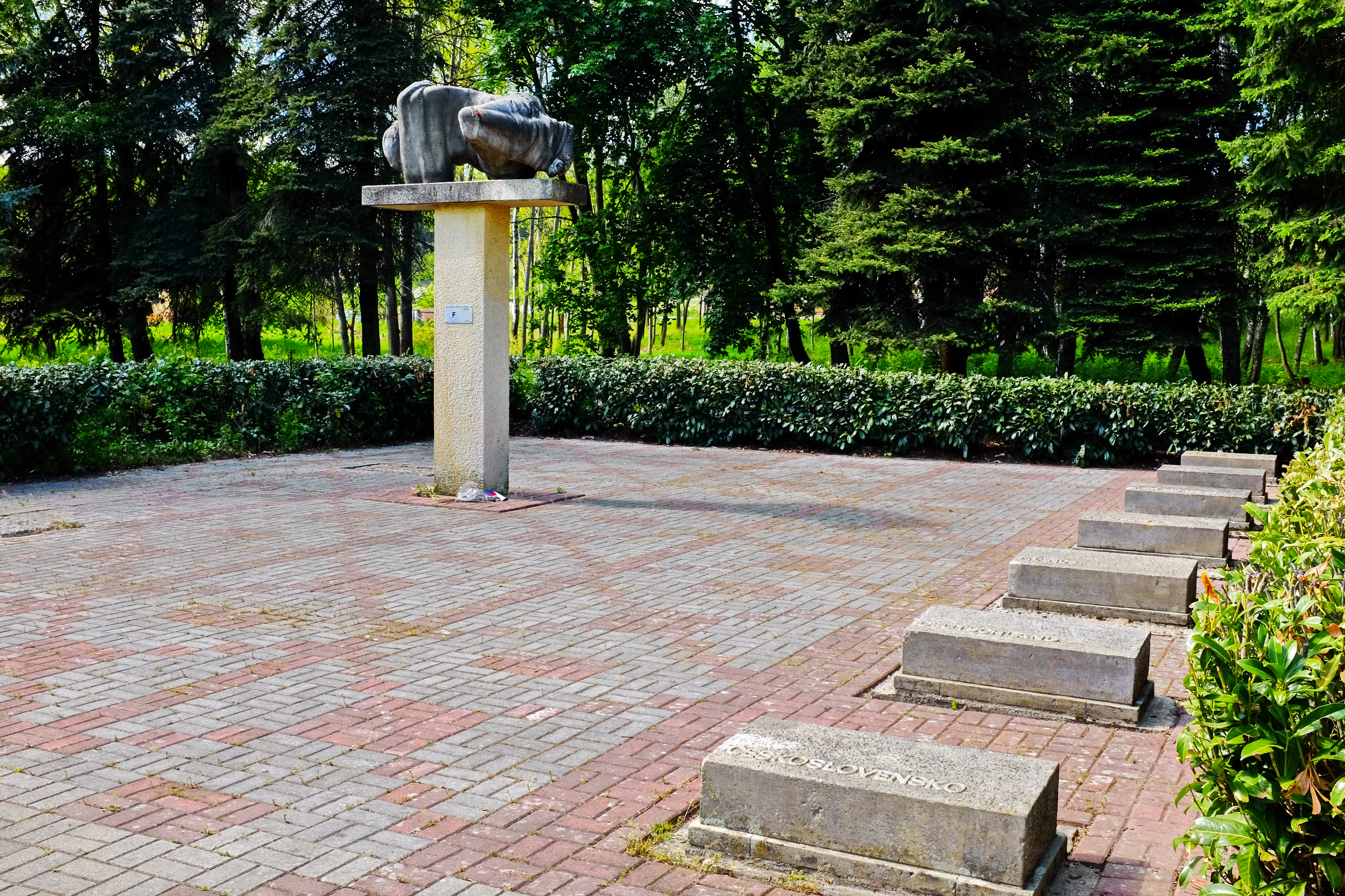
Memorial of Subcamp of Flossenbürg concentration camp

The main landmark is the Church of the Immaculate Conception. It was built in the Historicist style in 1924. In 1926, the rectory was added to the church.

A memorial of the subcamp of the Flossenbürg concentration camp was created in 1963 by Daniela Vinopalová and erected in 1965.

== Notable people ==
- Ernst Mosch (1925–1999), musician
