= 2005 Nordic Junior World Ski Championships =

International skiing competition

FIS Nordic Junior World Ski Championships 2005
- Host city: Rovaniemi, Finland
- Events: 13
- Opening: 21 March
- Closing: 26 March

The FIS Nordic Junior World Ski Championships 2005 took place in Rovaniemi, Finland from 21 March to 26 March 2005. It was the 28th Junior World Championships in Nordic skiing.

== Schedule ==
All times are in local time (UTC+2).

Cross-country

Date	Time	Event
21 March	10:00	Women's 10 km pursuit
21 March	11:00	Men's 20 km pursuit
23 March	12:00	Men's sprint Women's sprint
25 March	10:00	Women's 5 km free
25 March	11:30	Men's 10 km free
26 March	09:30	Women's 4×5 km relay
26 March	11:30	Men's 4×10 km relay

Nordic combined

Date	Time	Event
22 March	10:00	HS100 / 10 km
24 March	13:00	Team 4×5 km Mass Start / HS100
26 March	21:00	Sprint HS100 / 5 km

Ski jumping

Date	Time	Event
23 March	17:00	Team HS100
25 March	21:20	Individual HS100

== Medal summary ==
=== Junior events ===
==== Cross-country skiing ====
Event	Gold		Silver		Bronze	
Men's Junior Events
Men's sprint classic	Even Sletten; Norway		Petter Northug; Norway		Emil Jönsson; Sweden	
Men's 10 kilometre free	Petter Northug; Norway	23:06.1	Keishin Yoshida; Japan	23:36.1	Emil Hegle Svendsen; Norway	23:41.7
Men's 20 kilometre pursuit	Petter Northug; Norway	52:04.7	Toni Närväinen; Finland	52:06.3	Mikhail Devyatyarov Jr. Russia	52:10.5
Men's 4 × 10 km relay	Russia; Mikhail Devyatyarov Jr. Ilia Chernousov; Nikolay Khokhryakov; Egor Sorin	1:36:38.2	Norway; Kjell Christian Markset; Petter Northug; Ronny Hafsås; Emil Hegle Svendsen	1:38:06.4	France; Romain Vandel; Cyril Miranda; Maurice Manificat; Guilhem Alexandre	1:39:04.7
Ladies' Junior Events
Ladies' sprint classic	Kari Vikhagen Gjeitnes; Norway		Astrid Jacobsen; Norway		Ida Ingemarsdotter; Sweden	
Ladies' 5 kilometre free	Natalya Iliana; Russia	14:24.8	Yuliya Kolesnitchenko; Russia	14:39.2	Betty Ann Bjerkreim Nilsen; Norway	14:39.8
Ladies' 10 kilometre pursuit	Marte Elden; Norway	29:24.9	Olga Tiagai; Russia	29:29.4	Betty Ann Bjerkreim Nilsen; Norway	29:43.9
Ladies' 4 × 5 km relay	Norway; Astrid Jacobsen; Caroline Tangen; Betty Ann Bjerkreim Nilsen; Marte Elden	54:11.1	Russia; Olga Tiagai; Yuliya Kolesnitchenko; Natalya Iliana; Evgenya Bazarnova	54:28.3	Czech Republic; Eliška Hájková; Martina Chrástková; Lenka Munclingerová; Eva Nývltová	55:30.3

==== Nordic Combined ====
Event	Gold		Silver		Bronze	
Normal hill/5 km	Petter Tande; Norway	11:51.7	Florian Schillinger; Germany	+3.9	Tino Edelmann; Germany	+5.8
Normal hill/10 km	Petter Tande; Norway	25:56.6	Tino Edelmann; Germany	+57.4	Anssi Koivuranta; Finland	+1:18.2
Team 4 × 5 km/normal hill	Germany; Steffen Tepel; Tom Beetz; Florian Schillinger; Tino Edelmann	924.0	France; Maxime Boillot; Maxime Laheurte; François Braud; Jason Lamy-Chappuis	810.2	Czech Republic; Martin Skopek; Petr Kutal; Miroslav Dvořák; Aleš Vodseďálek	731.8

==== Ski jumping ====
Event	Gold		Silver		Bronze	
Individual normal hill	Jonas Ikonen; Finland	252.0	Arthur Pauli; Austria	245.5	Jurij Tepeš; Slovenia	245.0
Team normal hill	Slovenia; Mitja Mežnar; Matevž Šparovec; Jurij Tepeš; Nejc Frank	982.0	Poland; Paweł Urbański; Wojciech Topór; Piotr Żyła; Kamil Stoch	978.0	Finland; Anssi Koivuranta; Jere Kykkänen; Olli Pekkala; Joonas Ikonen	951.5

=== Medal table ===
* Host nation (Finland)

Rank	Nation	Gold	Silver	Bronze	Total
1	Norway (NOR)	8	3	3	14
2	Russia (RUS)	2	3	1	6
3	Germany (GER)	1	2	1	4
4	Finland (FIN)*	1	1	2	4
5	Slovenia (SVN)	1	0	1	2
6	France (FRA)	0	1	1	2
7	Austria (AUT)	0	1	0	1
7	Japan (JPN)	0	1	0	1
7	Poland (POL)	0	1	0	1
10	Czech Republic (CZE)	0	0	2	2
10	Sweden (SWE)	0	0	2	2
Totals (11 entries)		13	13	13	39
