= Ernst Uebel =

Musician

Ernst Robert Uebel
- Born: 9 June 1882; Klingenthal, German Empire
- Died: 11 November 1959 (aged 77); Klingenthal, East Germany
- Occupations: Musician, musical director & composer

Ernst Robert Uebel (9 June 1882 – 11 November 1959) was a German composer and musician.

He lived and worked as a musician, musical director and composer in his hometown. He is most notable for his marsch Jubelklänge (1926; variously translated as Sounds of Elation or Sounds of Joy), which is an integral part of repertoires of elevated ensembles of military and march music. Also, this march was part of the repertoire of the 1953 coronation of Queen Elizabeth II and the opening of the 1972 Winter Olympics in Sapporo.
