= Brunndöbra =

River in Germany

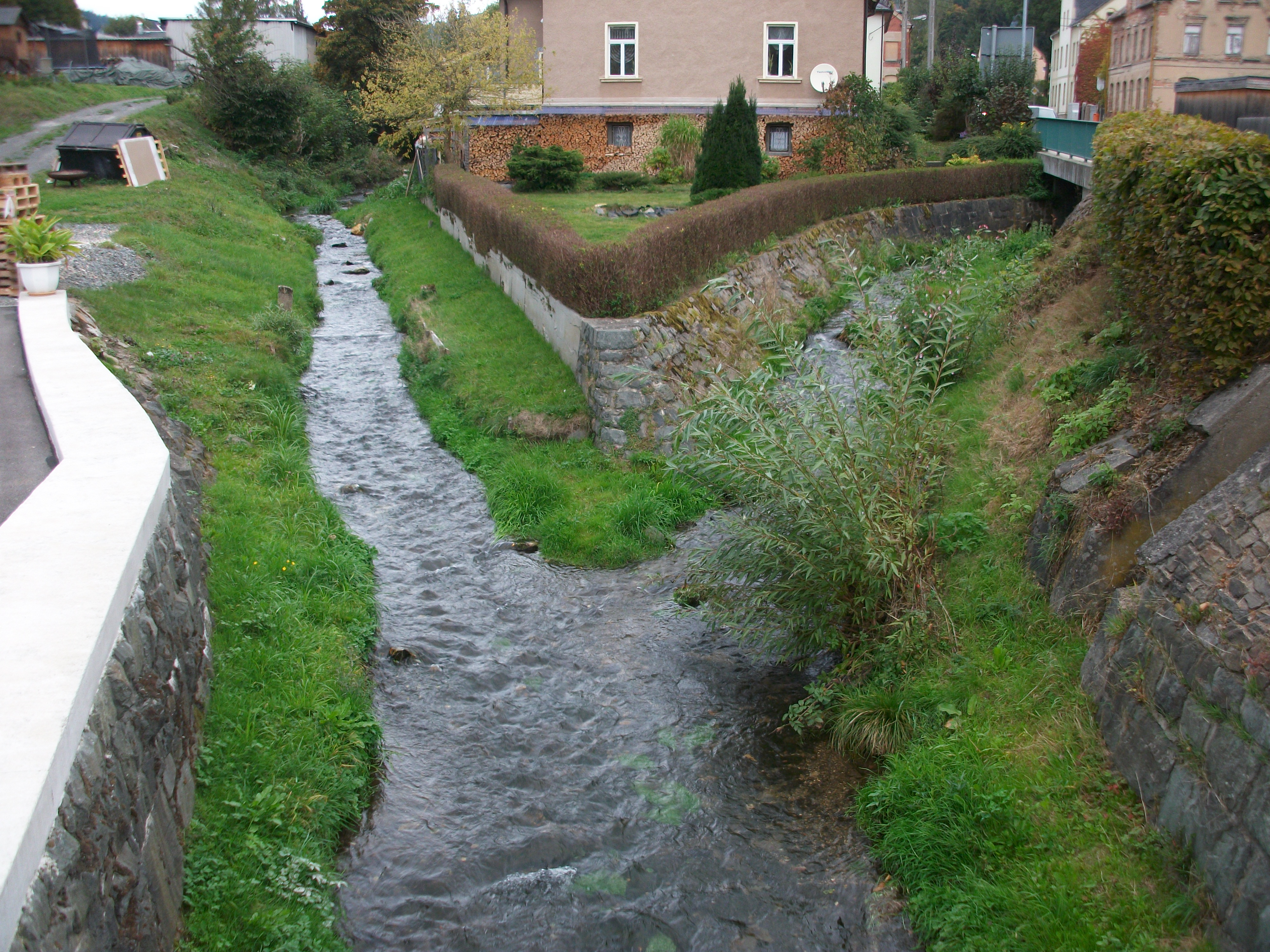

Location
- Country: Germany
- State: Saxony

Physical characteristics
- Mouth
  - location: Svatava
  - coordinates: 50°21′17″N 12°28′12″E

Basin features
- Progression: Svatava→ Ohře→ Elbe→ North Sea

The Brunndöbra is a river in Saxony, Germany. It is a tributary of the Svatava River. It flows through the town Klingenthal.

== See also ==
- List of rivers of Saxony
