= Polish Youth Olympic Days =

Youth multi-sport event in Poland

Polish Youth Olympic Days (Ogólnopolska Olimpiada Młodzieży), are Polish national games for the children and young adults that have been organised yearly since 1995. The games are held in four categories of sport:

- winter sports
- summer sports
- cross country running
- hall sports
