= Zelená Hora (Vyškov District) =

- Municipality
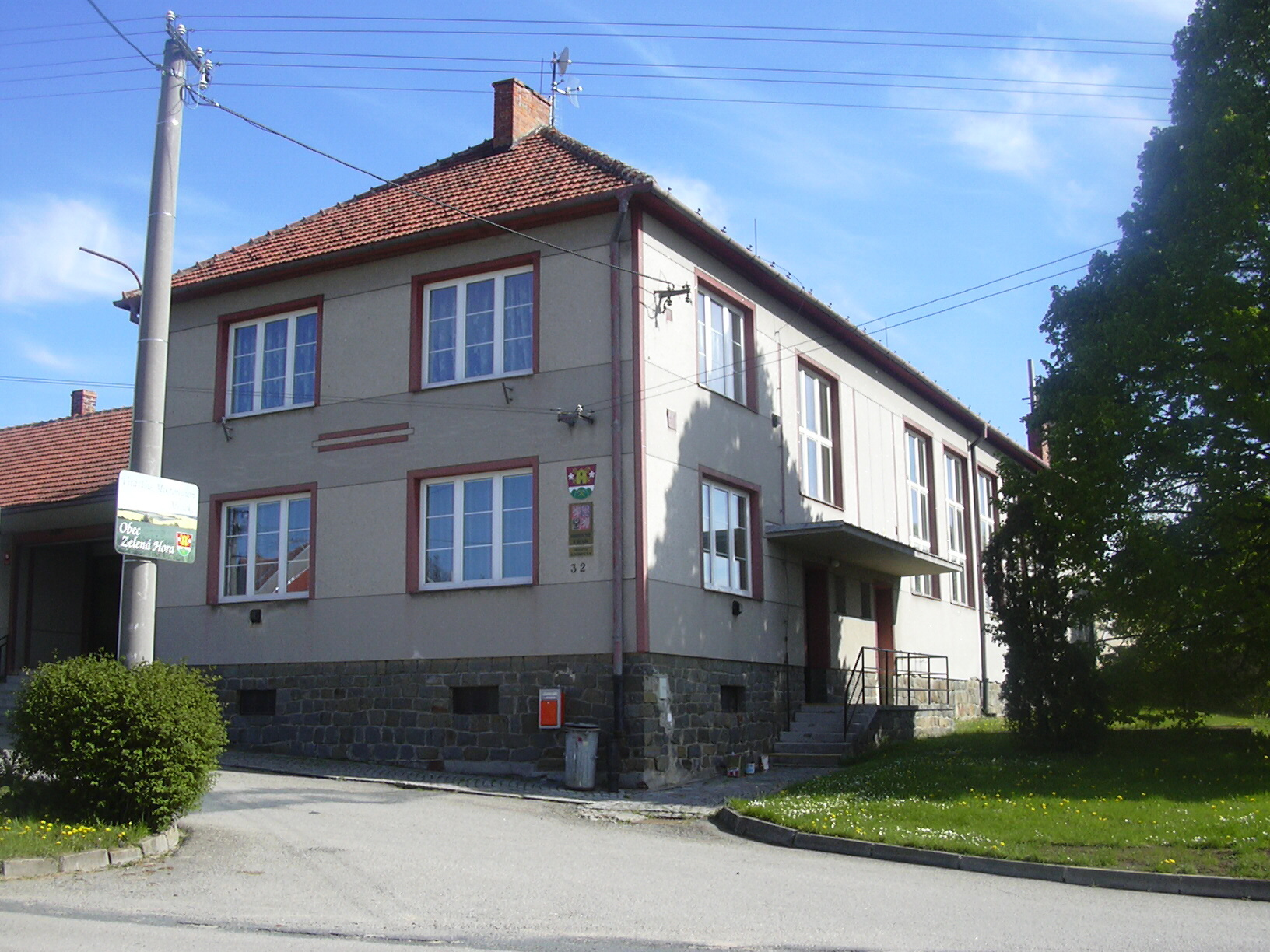
- Municipal office

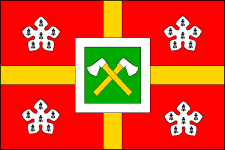
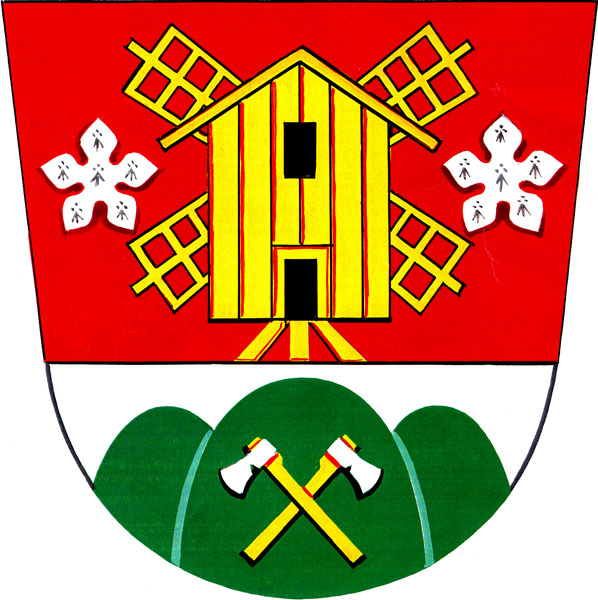
- Flag Coat of arms

- Location in the Czech Republic
- Coordinates: 49°19′44″N 17°0′49″E
- Country: Czech Republic
- Region: South Moravian
- District: Vyškov
- Founded: 1763

Area
  - Total: 2.96 km^{2} (1.14 sq mi)
- Elevation: 368 m (1,207 ft)

Population (2026-01-01)
  - Total: 322
  - Density: 109/km^{2} (282/sq mi)
- Time zone: UTC+1 (CET)
  - Summer (DST): UTC+2 (CEST)
- Postal code: 683 21
- Website: www.zelenahora.eu

Zelená Hora is a municipality and village in Vyškov District in the South Moravian Region of the Czech Republic. It has about 300 inhabitants.

Zelená Hora lies approximately 8 kilometres (5 mi) north of Vyškov, 33 km (21 mi) north-east of Brno, and 206 km (128 mi) south-east of Prague.

== Demographics ==
Historical population
| Year | Pop. | ±% |
|---|---|---|
| 1869 | 322 | — |
| 1880 | 420 | +30.4% |
| 1890 | 443 | +5.5% |
| 1900 | 451 | +1.8% |
| 1910 | 541 | +20.0% |
| 1921 | 526 | −2.8% |
| 1930 | 480 | −8.7% |
| 1950 | 259 | −46.0% |
| 1961 | 300 | +15.8% |
| 1970 | 279 | −7.0% |
| 1980 | 265 | −5.0% |
| 1991 | 231 | −12.8% |
| 2001 | 219 | −5.2% |
| 2011 | 240 | +9.6% |
| 2021 | 297 | +23.8% |
Source: Censuses
