= Klingenthal =

- Town
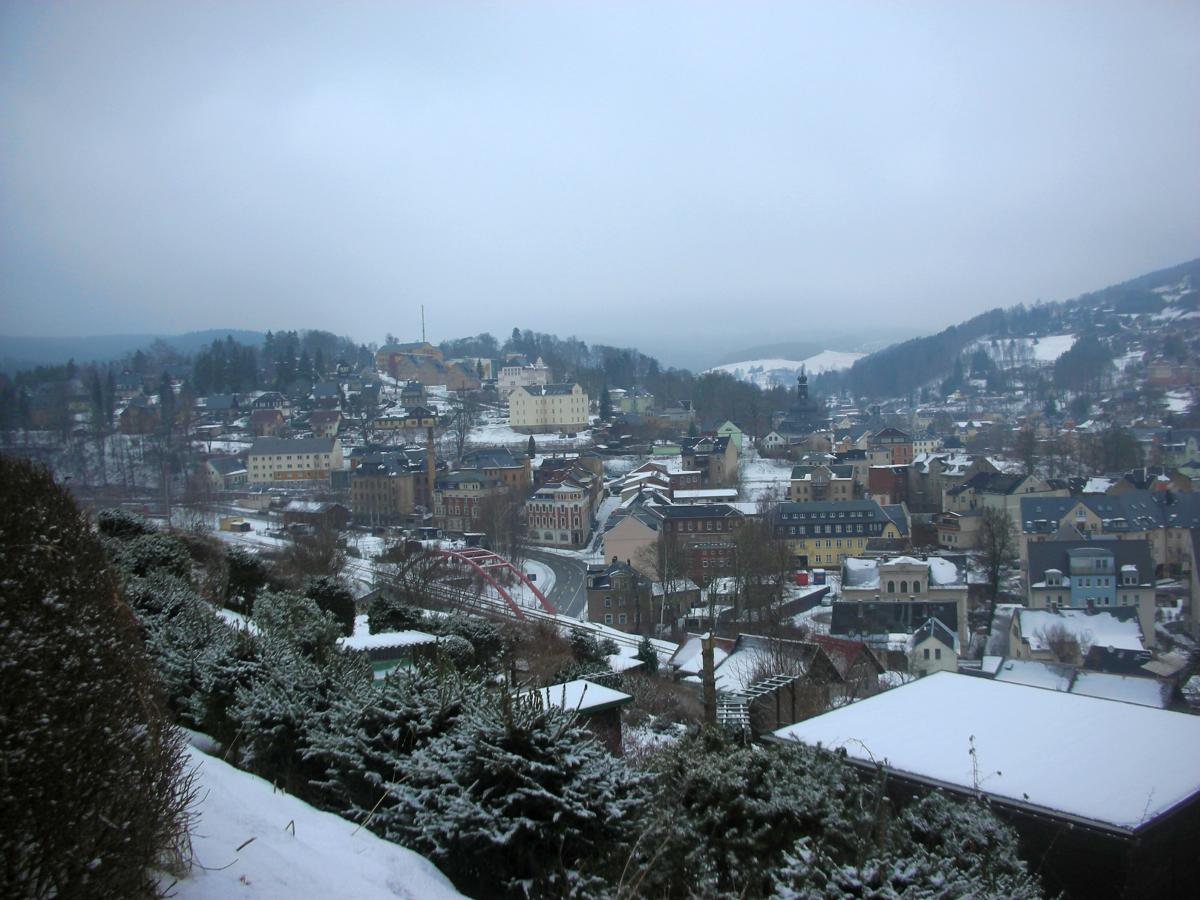
- Central Klingenthal, January 2010

- Flag Coat of arms

- Location of Klingenthal within Vogtlandkreis district
- Interactive map of Klingenthal
- Location within Germany Location within Saxony
- Coordinates: 50°22′1″N 12°28′07″E
- Country: Germany
- State: Saxony
- District: Vogtlandkreis

Government
  - Mayor (2022–29): Judith Sandner (FW)

Area
  - Total: 50.44 km^{2} (19.47 sq mi)
- Elevation: 569 m (1,867 ft)

Population (2025-12-31)
  - Total: 7,211
  - Density: 143.0/km^{2} (370.3/sq mi)
- Time zone: UTC+01:00 (CET)
  - Summer (DST): UTC+02:00 (CEST)
- Postal codes: 08248, 08267 (Zwota)
- Dialling codes: 037467, 037465 (Mühlleithen)
- Vehicle registration: V, AE, OVL, PL, RC
- Website: klingenthal.de

Klingenthal (German pronunciation: [ˈklɪŋənˌtaːl]) is a town in the Vogtland region, in Saxony, south-eastern Germany.

== Geography ==
Klingenthal is situated directly on the border with the Czech Republic opposite the Czech town of Kraslice. Klingenthal is 29 km southeast of Plauen, and 33 km northwest of Karlovy Vary. It is part of the Musikwinkel, a historical center of musical instrument manufacturing.

The Aschberg (lit. 'cinder mountain') towers above the town at 936 m. The extremely elongated town, 10.5 km from end to end, is surrounded by numerous woods of firs. The town is bisected by the Brunndöbra and Svatava rivers. The two rivers unite at the Czech–German border to form the Svatava river, which in turn flows into the Ohře.

== History ==
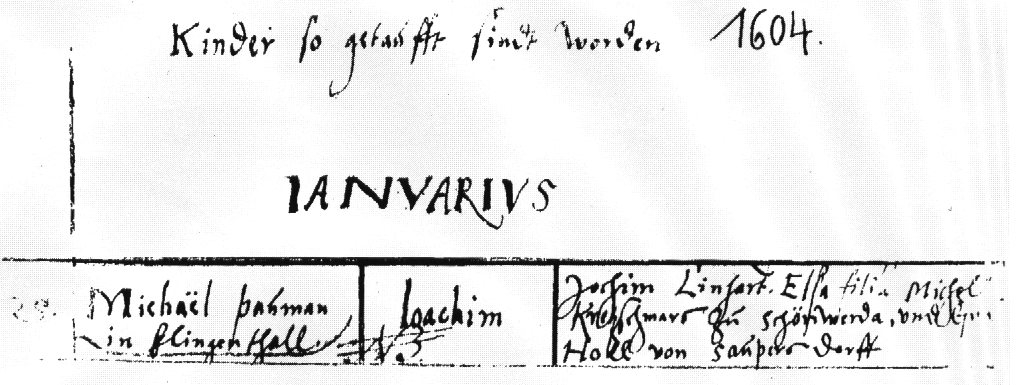
First documented mention in neighboring Schöneck's church register

In 1591, Sebastian Köppel established a hammer mill near the border to Bohemia on the banks of the Zwota in order to capitalize on the rich deposits of iron ore and the region's vast supplies of wood, both for building and charcoal production. On 1 February 1602, there was the first documented mention of the "Höllhammer" (in English approximately: "Hell Hammer" or "Hollow Hammer") in the neighboring town of Schöneck's church register. At that time, blacksmiths, miners and charcoal makers were living there. In 1628, the hammer mill burned down and was only partly rebuilt. In the mid-17th century, Bohemian emigrants fleeing the Counter-Reformation brought the luthier's craft to Klingenthal, which–after the Peace of Westphalia–was a safe haven for Protestants.

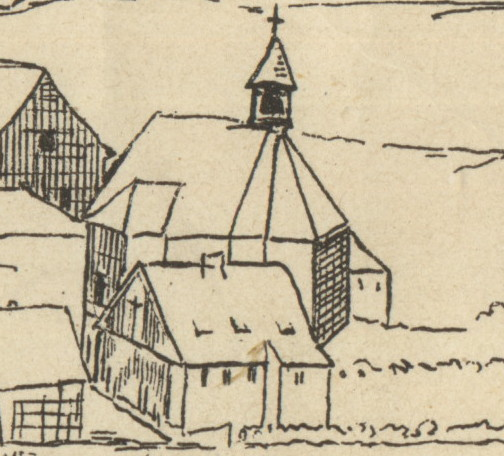
The original wooden Zum Friedefürsten Church of Klingenthal in 1726

In 1716, the foundation of a luthiers' guild was celebrated. Towards the end of the 18th century, bow makers' and string makers' crafts came to Klingenthal, but also the production of wood and brass wind instruments. In 1829, mouth harp production followed and in 1852, accordion production began. In the second half of the 19th century, the production of mouth harps, accordions and other more complex instruments had mostly displaced older branches of musical instrument production.

In 1875, Klingenthal was connected to railway services. On 1 October 1919, Klingenthal received its town charter; on 1 July 1950 Sachsenberg-Georgenthal were incorporated into the town.

On 25 July 1952, parts of the former districts of Auerbach and Oelsnitz were cut off to form the district of Klingenthal. From 1949 to 1990, Klingenthal was home to the Klingenthaler Harmonikawerke, a state-owned company which was the main producer of accordions, harmonicas, and electronic instruments in East Germany.

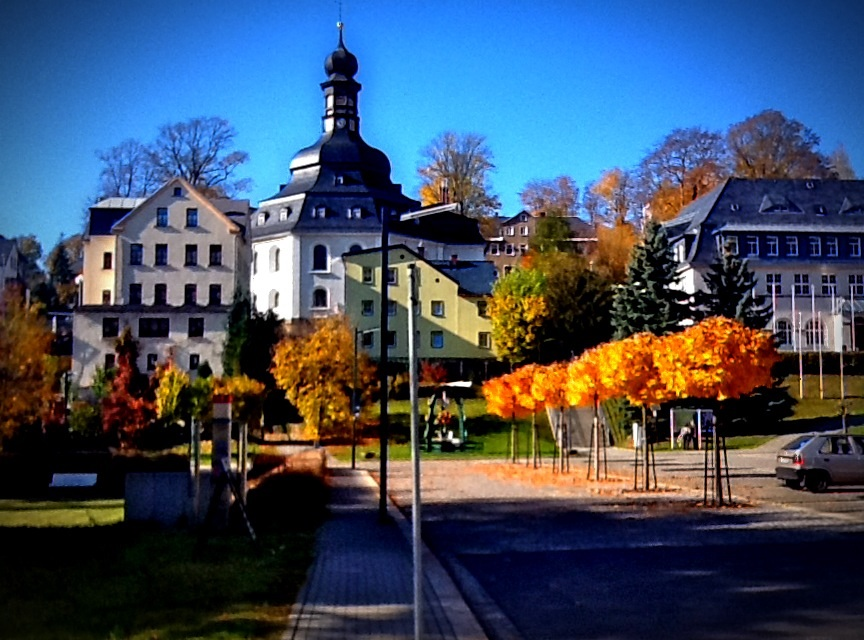
Klingenthal, June 2013

On 1 April 1992, Mühlleithen, a settlement on the north-western crest of the Aschberg, was incorporated. Since 1996, Klingenthal has been part of Vogtlandkreis. In contrast to Klingenthal, Bas-Rhin, the towns name was Klingenthal/Sa. (Sa. standing for Saxony). By decision of the town government, the Sa. appendix was annulled in January 2007. Ever since, the town's name has been Klingenthal.

== Economy ==
While traditionally, the town has been a manufacturing center of musical instruments, it is a ski resort. One of the main branches of Klingenthal's economy is tourism. It is home to the Baroque Zum Friedefürsten round church.

In 2005 the Vogtland Arena was finished and competitions in the Nordic Combined World Cup and Ski Jumping World Cup have been held there. It had been a national center for ski jumping when Klingenthal was part of the German Democratic Republic (East Germany).

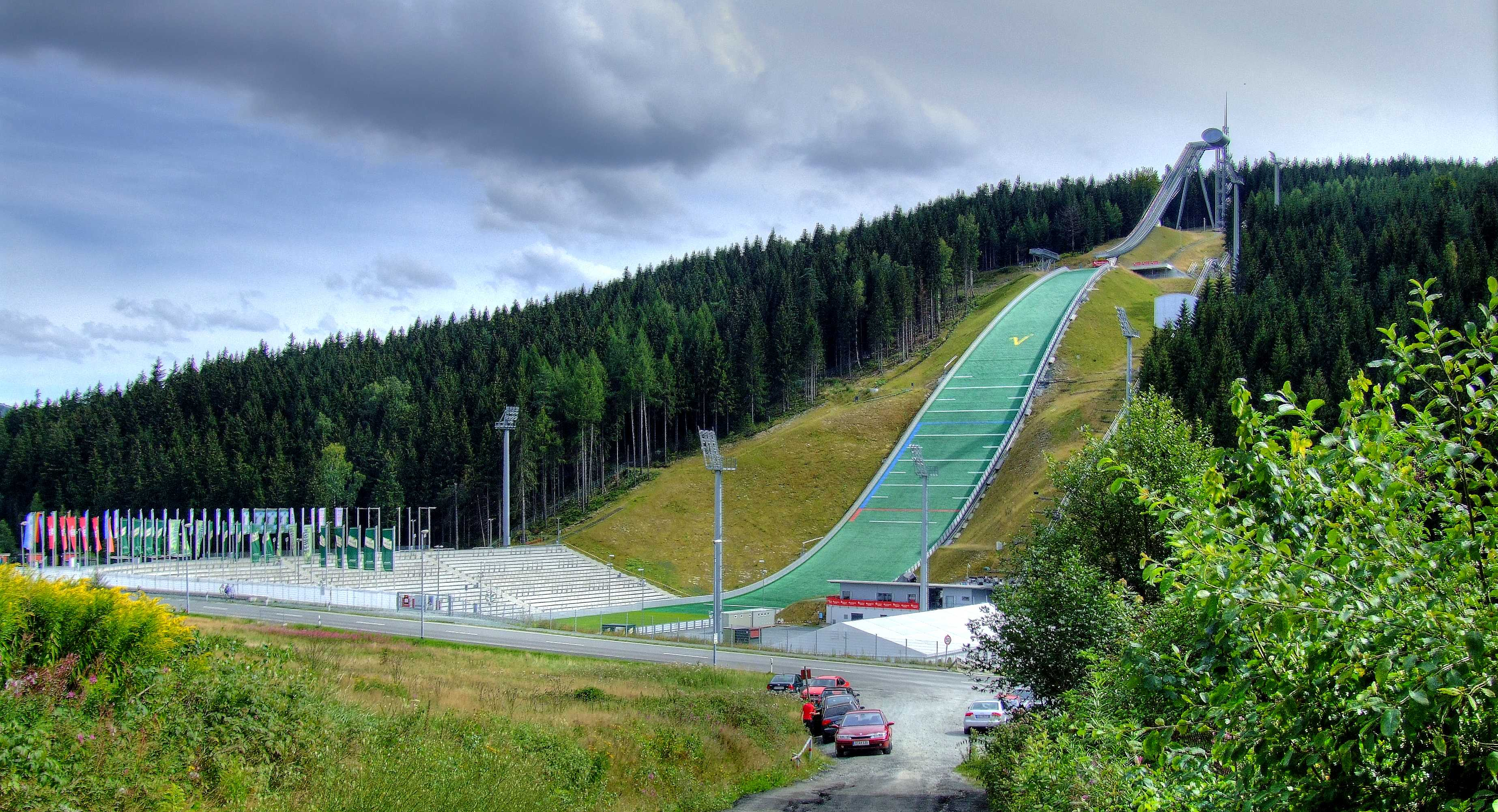
Vogtland Arena on the northern slope of the Schwarzberg mountain, August 2007

== Notable people ==
- Max Hess (1878–1975), musician, (solo-)bugler and Schlaraffian
- Rolf Thomas Lorenz (born 1959), composer
- Karl Möckel (1901–1948), Nazi SS officer at Auschwitz concentration camp executed for war crimes
- Karlheinz Steinmüller, physicist and science fiction author
- Ernst Uebel (1882–1959), composer and musician
