= Svatava (river) =

River in the Czech Republic and Germany

Svatava Zwota
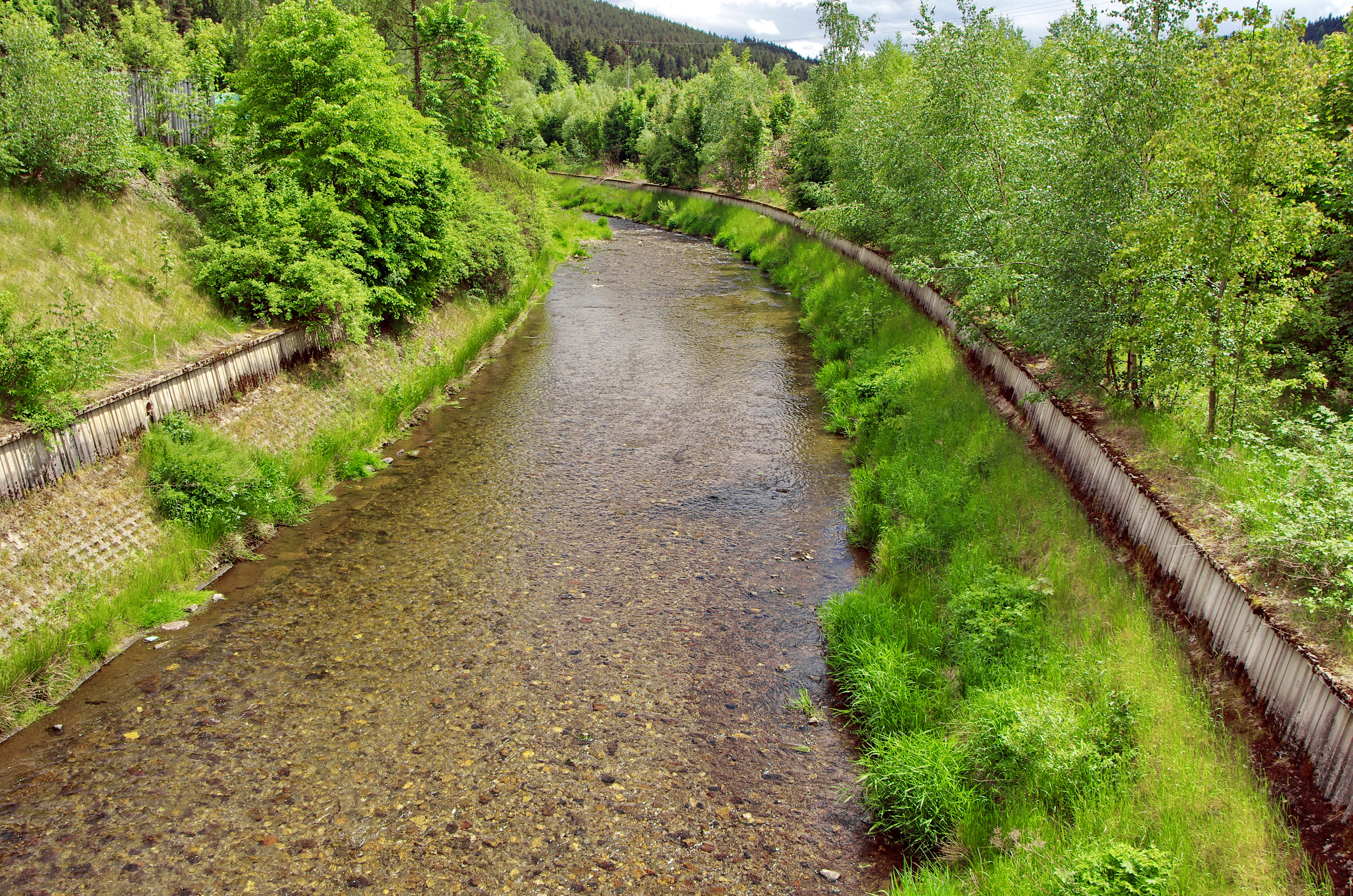
- The Svatava in Kraslice

Location
- Countries: Czech Republic; Germany
- Regions/ States: Karlovy Vary; Saxony

Physical characteristics
- Source
  - location: Schöneck, Ore Mountains
  - coordinates: 50°21′0″N 12°22′9″E
  - elevation: 710 m (2,330 ft)
- Mouth
  - location: Ohře
  - coordinates: 50°10′59″N 12°38′26″E
  - elevation: 388 m (1,273 ft)
- Length: 41.0 km (25.5 mi)
- Basin size: 297.5 km^{2} (114.9 sq mi)
- Discharge
  - average: 4.5 m^{3}/s (160 cu ft/s) near estuary

Basin features
- Progression: Ohře→ Elbe→ North Sea

The Svatava (Czech pronunciation: [ˈsvatava]; German: Zwota) is a river in the Czech Republic and Germany. It flows through Saxony in Germany and through the Karlovy Vary Region. It is a left tributary of the Ohře River. It is 41.0 km (25.5 mi) long.

== Etymology ==
The name is derived from the Czech word svatá, i.e. 'saint'. The name first appeared in Latin texts from 1181 and 1184 as Zuata and Znata, but Znata is considered a typo. The settlements Svatava and Zwota were named after the river.

== Characteristic ==
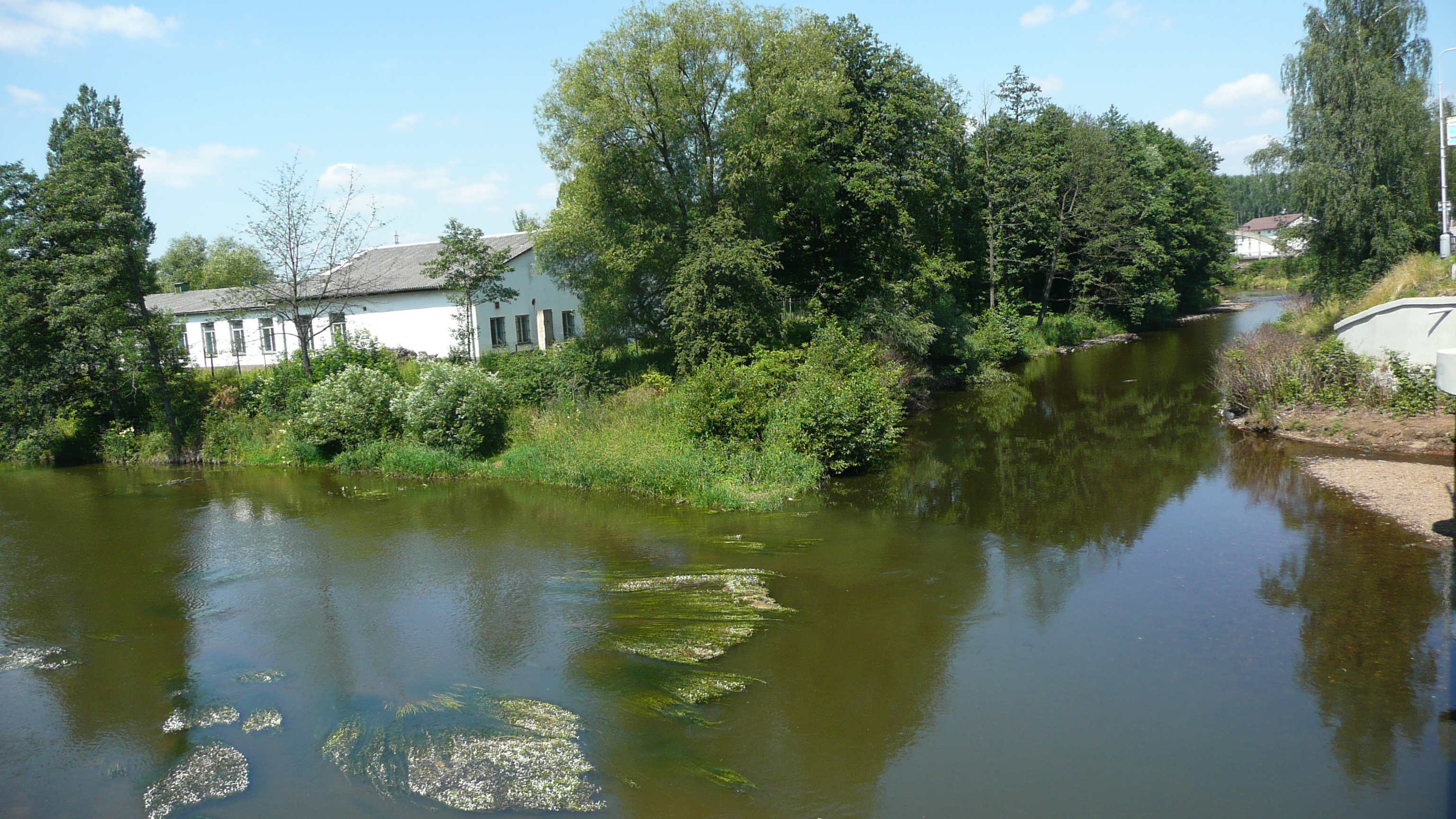
Confluence of the Svatava (right) and Ohře

The Svatava (as Zwota) originates in the territory of Markneukirchen in the Ore Mountains at an elevation of 682 m (2,238 ft); however, the Zwotawasser stream, which originates in the territory of Schöneck at an elevation of 710 m (2,330 ft) is usually referred to as the main source of the river. The Svatava then flows to Sokolov, where it merges with the Ohře River at an elevation of 388 m (1,273 ft). It is 41 km (25 mi) long, of which 28.8 km (17.9 mi) is in the Czech Republic, 1.5 km (0.93 mi) forms the Czech–German border and 10.7 km (6.6 mi) is in Germany. Its drainage basin has an area of 297.5 km^{2} (114.9 sq mi), of which 239.8 km^{2} (92.6 sq mi) is in the Czech Republic.

The longest tributaries of the Svatava are:

Tributary	Length (km)	Side
Rotava	15.6	left
Stříbrný potok	12.3	left
Lomnický potok	9.5	left
Radvanovský potok	7.7	right
Brunndöbra	7.4	left

== Course ==
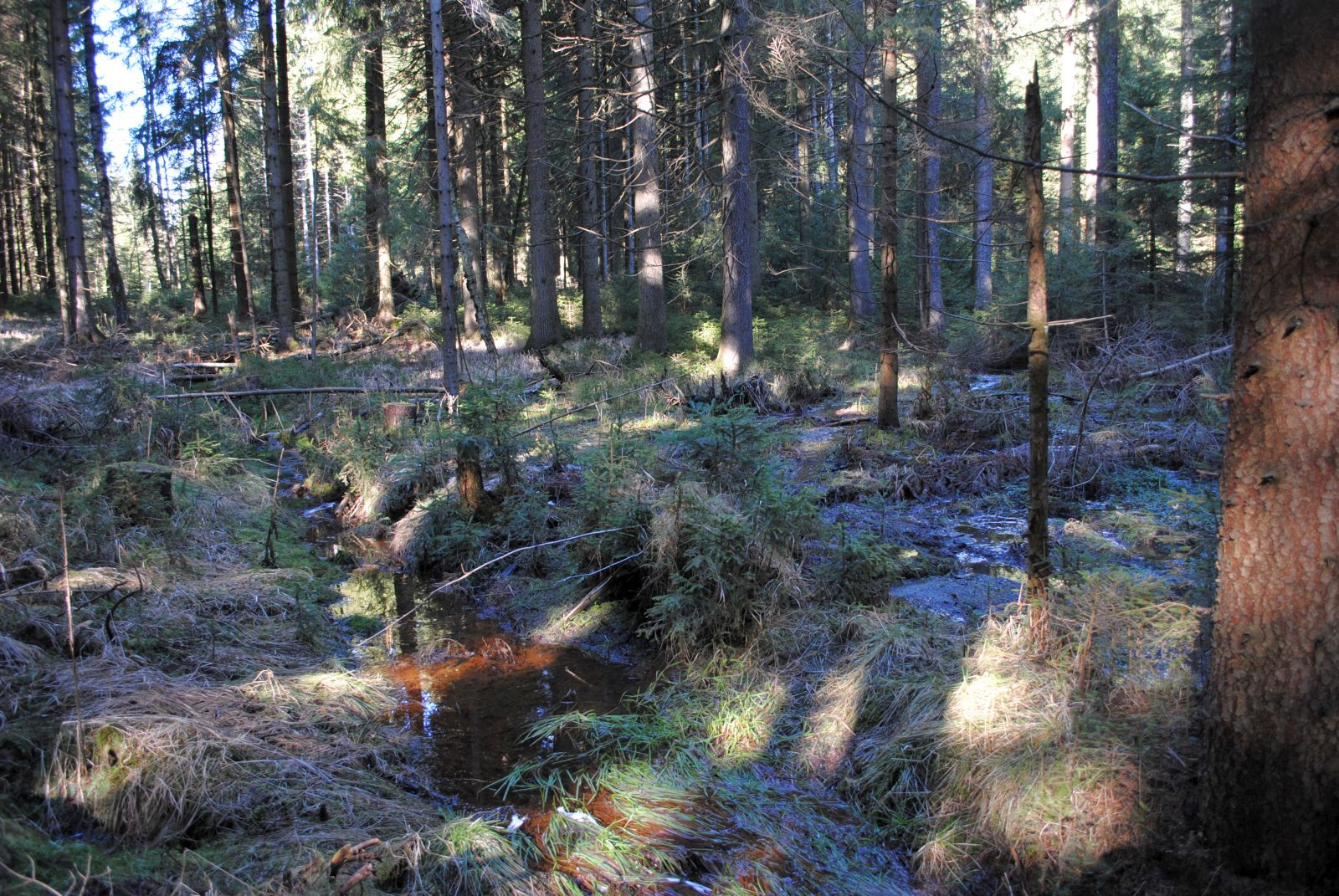
Spring of the Svatava

The river flows through the Ore Mountains, only the last 3.5 km (2.2 mi) of the river are located in the Sokolov Basin. The most notable settlement on the river is the town of Sokolov. The river flows through the municipal territories of Schöneck (as Zwotawasser) and Klingenthal in Germany and then continues in the Czech Republic through Kraslice, Rotava, Oloví, Dolní Nivy, Krajková, Josefov, Svatava and Sokolov.

== Bodies of water ==
There are 196 bodies of water in the basin area, but none of them is notable. The largest of them is the fishpond Přebuz with an area of 2.3 ha (5.7 acres).

== Fauna ==
The occurrence of 20 species of fish and one species of lamprey was proven in the river; 11 species of fish were observed in the upper course and 17 species in the lower course. Of the endangered species, the most significant is the occurrence of the brook lamprey, the common minnow and the European bullhead. On the lower course of the Svatava, ide and burbot also occurred.

== Tourism ==
The Svatava is suitable for river tourism. About 29 km (18 mi) of the river is navigable. Although it is a relatively fast river, it is not too difficult for paddlers.

== See also ==
- List of rivers of the Czech Republic
- List of rivers of Saxony
