= Kraslice =

- Town
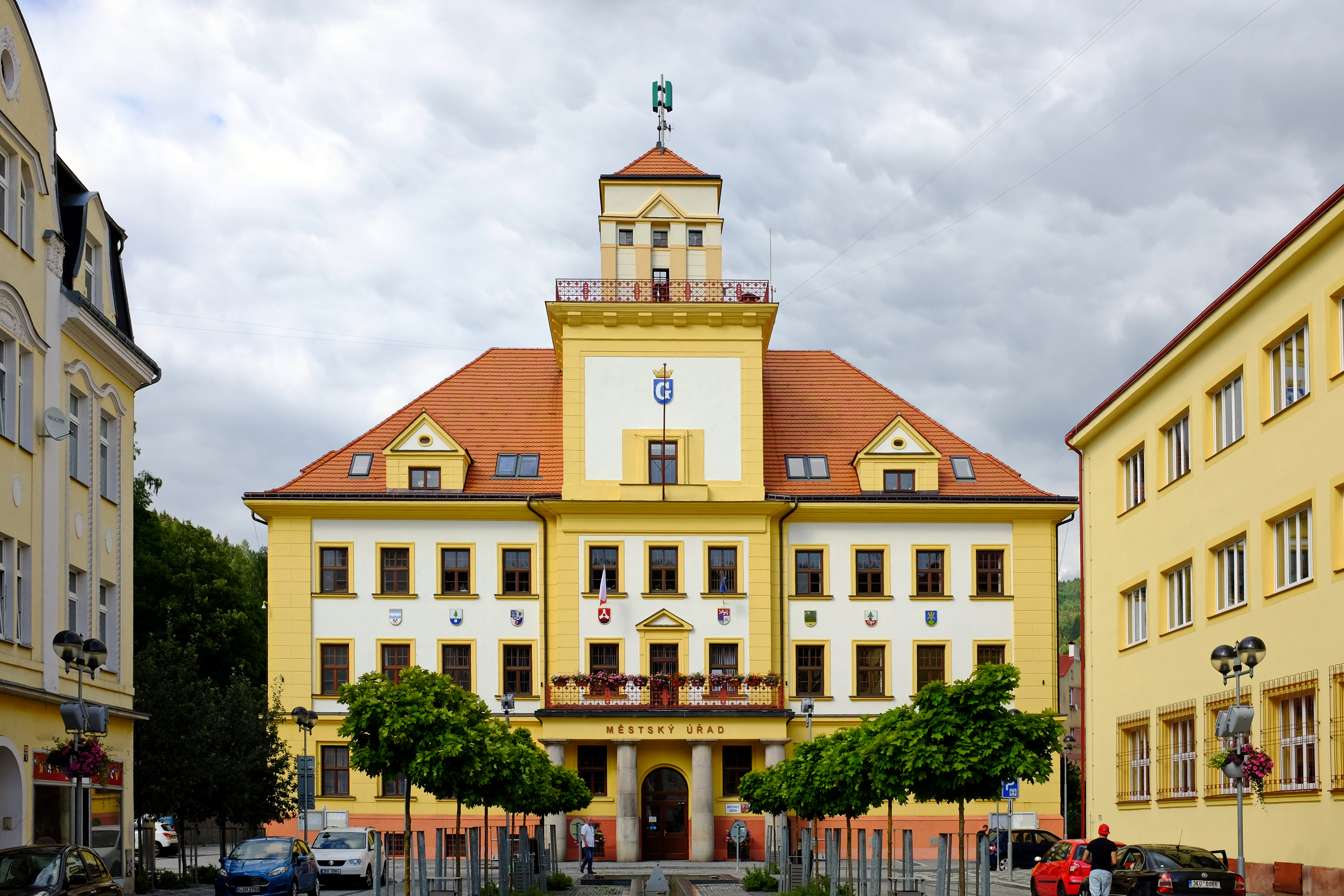
- Town hall

- Flag Coat of arms

- Location in the Czech Republic
- Coordinates: 50°19′45″N 12°30′31″E
- Country: Czech Republic
- Region: Karlovy Vary
- District: Sokolov
- First mentioned: 1272

Government
  - Mayor: Jiřina Junková

Area
  - Total: 81.33 km^{2} (31.40 sq mi)
- Elevation: 514 m (1,686 ft)

Population (2026-01-01)
  - Total: 6,369
  - Density: 78.31/km^{2} (202.8/sq mi)
- Time zone: UTC+1 (CET)
  - Summer (DST): UTC+2 (CEST)
- Postal code: 358 01
- Website: www.kraslice.cz

Kraslice (Czech pronunciation: [ˈkraslɪtsɛ]; German: Graslitz) is a town in Sokolov District in the Karlovy Vary Region of the Czech Republic. It has about 6,400 inhabitants. The town is located on the Svatava River in the Ore Mountains, on the border with Germany. It is known for the manufacture of musical instruments.

Kraslice was founded in the mid-13th century and became a town in 1370. It was a large and important town until World War II. The main landmark of the town is the Church of Corpus Christi.

== Administrative division ==
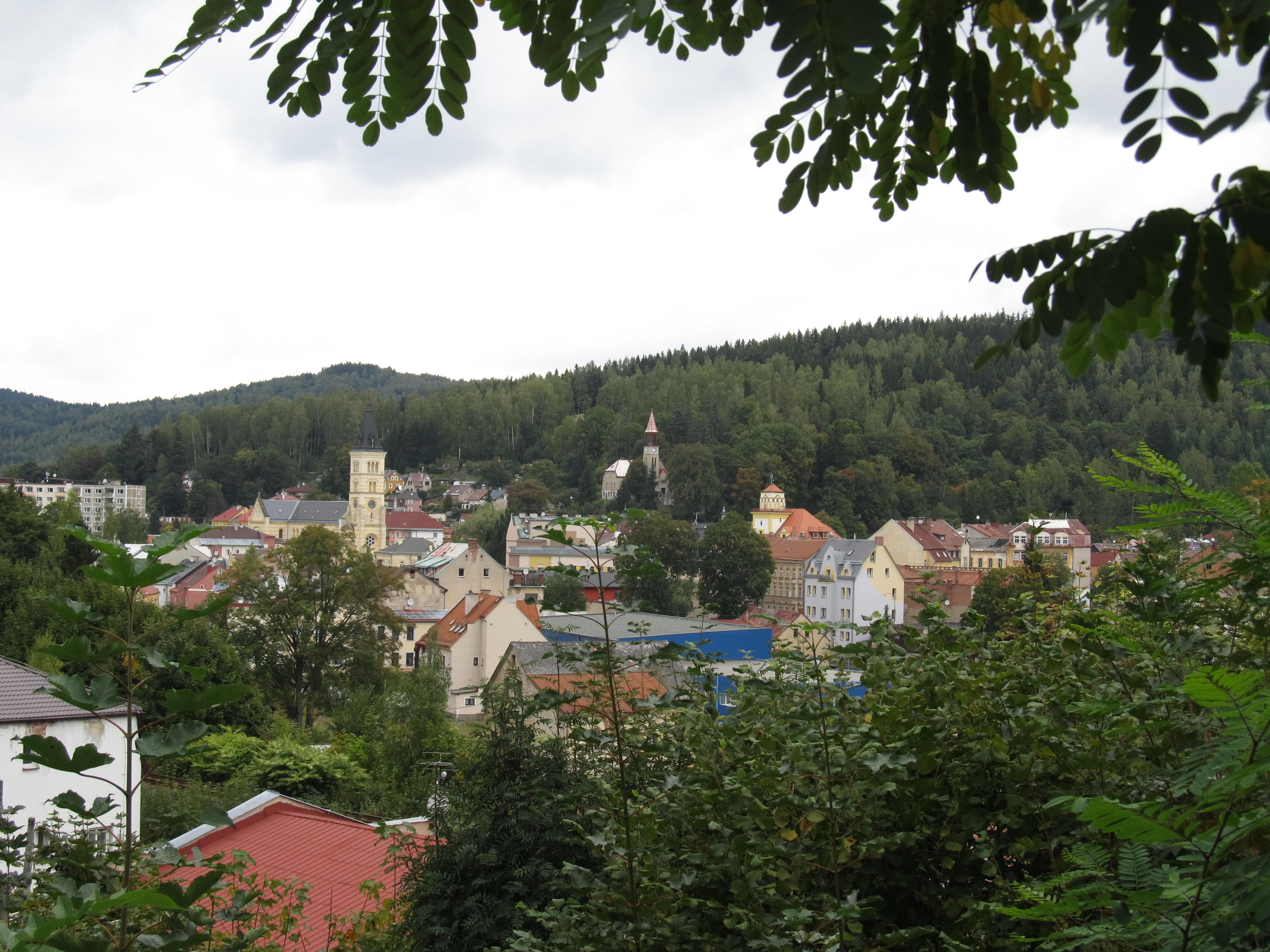
General view of the town

Kraslice consists of 15 municipal parts (in brackets population according to the 2021 census):

- Kraslice (5,834)
- Černá (12)
- Čirá (29)
- Hraničná (0)
- Kámen (7)
- Kostelní (16)
- Krásná (87)
- Liboc (11)
- Mlýnská (18)
- Počátky (15)
- Sklená (20)
- Sněžná (31)
- Tisová (88)
- Valtéřov (3)
- Zelená Hora (135)

== Etymology ==
The roots of the name derive from the medieval German word Graz, meaning 'trimmed conifer twigs'. The name Graslitz was then a diminutive of the word Graz. The Czech name Kraslice is a transcription of the German name and coincidentally it also literally means 'blown easter egg'.

== Geography ==
Kraslice is located about 18 kilometres (11 mi) north of Sokolov and 26 km (16 mi) northwest of Karlovy Vary. It lies on the border with Germany, adjacent to the German town of Klingenthal. It is situated in the western part of the Ore Mountains. The highest point is the mountain Počátecký vrch at 819 m (2,687 ft) above sea level. The built-up area is situated in the valley of the Svatava River and its tributary, the stream Stříbrný potok.

Kraslice lies in an area known for swarm type seismic activity. The last strong earthquake swarm was in 1986.

== History ==
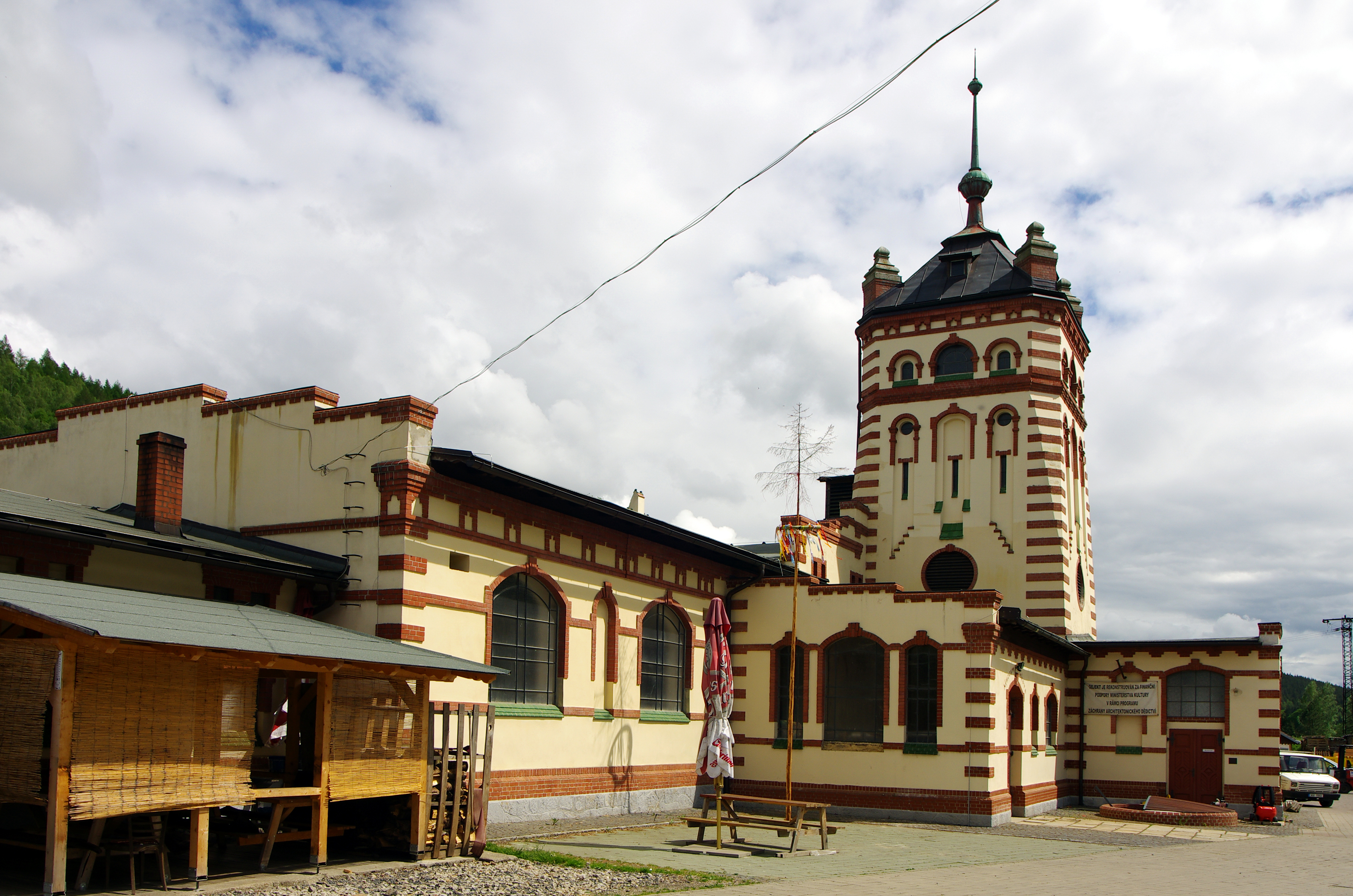
Municipal slaughterhouse

The area was settled by German monks from Waldsassen Abbey in the 12th and 13th centuries. In the mid-13th century, a guard castle was built here and settlements were established around it. The first written mention of Kraslice is from 1272, when King Ottokar II of Bohemia donated it to Jindřich the Elder of Plavno. During the rule of the Lords of Plauen in the 14th century, tin, lead and silver mining has developed in the area, and Kraslice became a prosperous settlement. In 1370, it was promoted by Charles IV to a royal town.

At the beginning of the 15th century, Kraslice became the seat of robber knights, and in 1412 the town was looted by the army, which aimed to rid the region of robbers. The town did not recover until 1527, when it was acquired by Jeroným Schlick and when it became a free mining town. Ore mining in the vicinity of Kraslice has been declining since the 17th century. From 1666 to 1848, the town was owned by the Nostitz family. Mining was replaced by folk crafts, the textile industry, and the manufacture of musical instruments and toys. In 1886, the railway was built.

From 1938 to 1945 it was annexed by Nazi Germany and administered as part of the Reichsgau Sudetenland. In 1944 a women's subcamp of Flossenbürg concentration camp was established here. The German-speaking population was expelled in 1945 and the town was resettled with Czechs.

== Demographics ==
Historical population

Year	Pop.	±%
1869	12,006	—
1880	14,176	+18.1%
1890	17,147	+21.0%
1900	19,264	+12.3%
1910	22,418	+16.4%

Year	Pop.	±%
1921	20,419	−8.9%
1930	22,310	+9.3%
1950	7,383	−66.9%
1961	7,617	+3.2%
1970	7,128	−6.4%

Year	Pop.	±%
1980	7,371	+3.4%
1991	7,604	+3.2%
2001	7,273	−4.4%
2011	6,695	−7.9%
2021	6,306	−5.8%

Source: Censuses

== Economy ==
Kraslice is known for the Amati Kraslice company, a manufacturer of musical instruments. The tradition of this manufacture dates back to 1631.

== Transport ==
Kraslice is located on the railway line Sokolov–Klingenthal. Passenger services are provided by the railway company of GW Train Regio.

== Sights ==
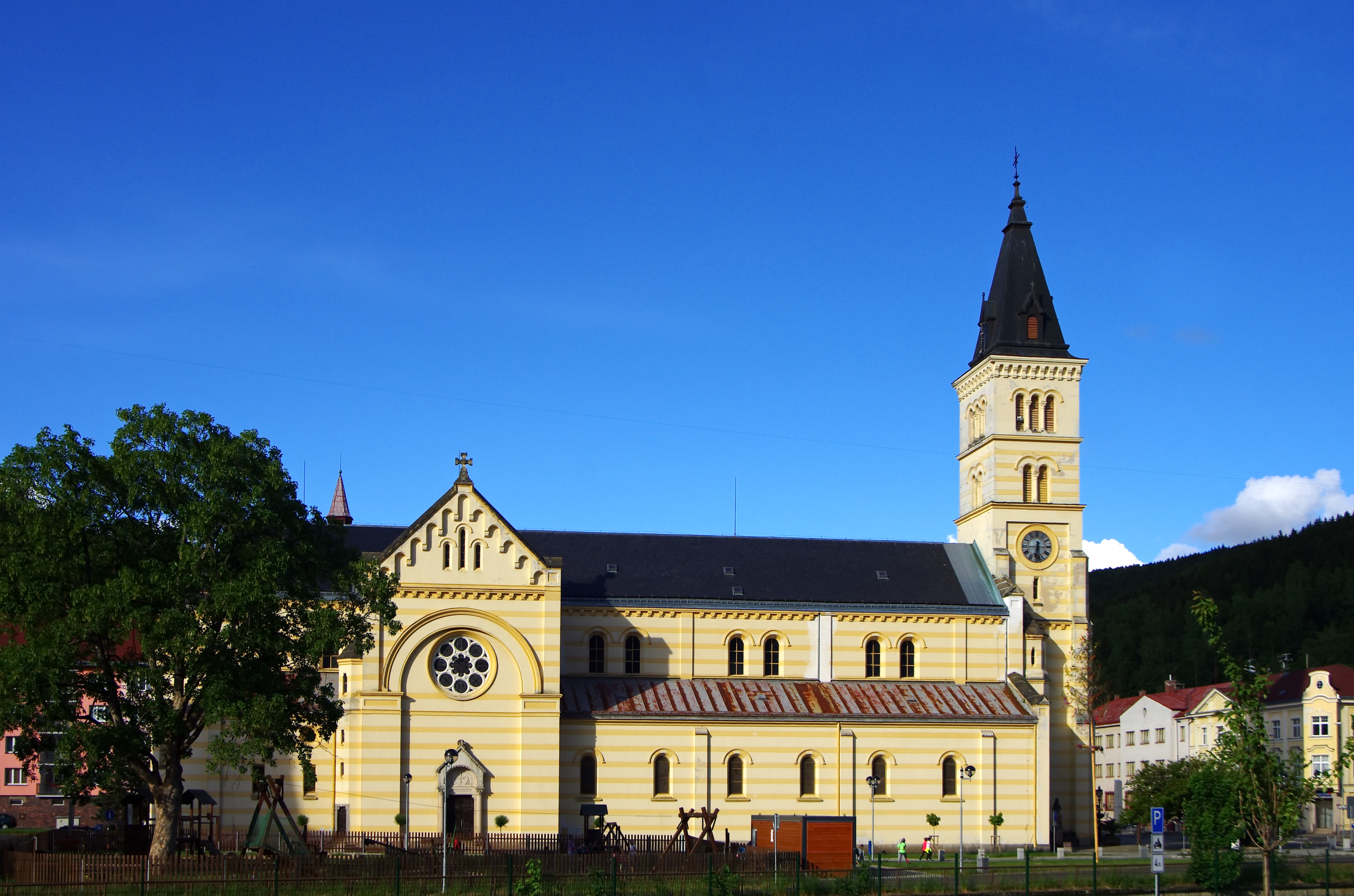
Church of Corpus Christi

The main landmark of the town centre is the Church of Corpus Christi. It was built in the neo-Romanesque style in 1893–1896 and replaced a dilapidated church from 1619. It is a three-aisled basilica with a prominent tower.

Municipal slaughterhouse is a unique complex of Art Nouveau buildings, created in 1904. It is protected as a technical and cultural monument. Today it is privately owned and gradually reconstructed.

== Notable people ==
- Julius Meinl I (1824–1914), Austrian businessman
- Rudolf Dellinger (1857–1910), German Bohemian composer
- Roland Bauer (1928–2017), German politician
- Petr Drozda (born 1952), wrestler and stuntman
- Eliška Staňková (born 1984), discus thrower
- Kateřina Zohnová (born 1984), basketball player
- Michael Krmenčík (born 1993), footballer

== Twin towns – sister cities ==
Kraslice is twinned with:

- Klingenthal, Germany
