= Vysoká Pec =

Vysoká Pec may refer to places in the Czech Republic:

- Vysoká Pec (Chomutov District), a municipality and village in the Ústí nad Labem Region
- Vysoká Pec (Karlovy Vary District), a municipality and village in the Karlovy Vary Region
- Vysoká Pec, a village and part of Bohutín (Příbram District) in the Central Bohemian Region
