= Stanovice =

Stanovice may refer to places in the Czech Republic:

- Stanovice (Karlovy Vary District), a municipality and village in the Karlovy Vary Region
- Stanovice (Trutnov District), a municipality and village in the Hradec Králové Region
- Stanovice, a village and part of Nová Cerekev in the Vysočina Region
