= Tisová =

Tisová may refer to places in the Czech Republic:

- Tisová (Tachov District), a municipality and village in the Plzeň Region
- Tisová (Ústí nad Orlicí District), a municipality and village in the Pardubice Region
- Tisová, a village and part of Bohutín (Příbram District) in the Central Bohemian Region
- Tisová, a village and part of Kraslice in the Karlovy Vary Region
- Tisová, a village and part of Nejdek in the Karlovy Vary Region
- Tisová, a village and part of Otročín in the Karlovy Vary Region
