= Krásné Údolí =

- Town
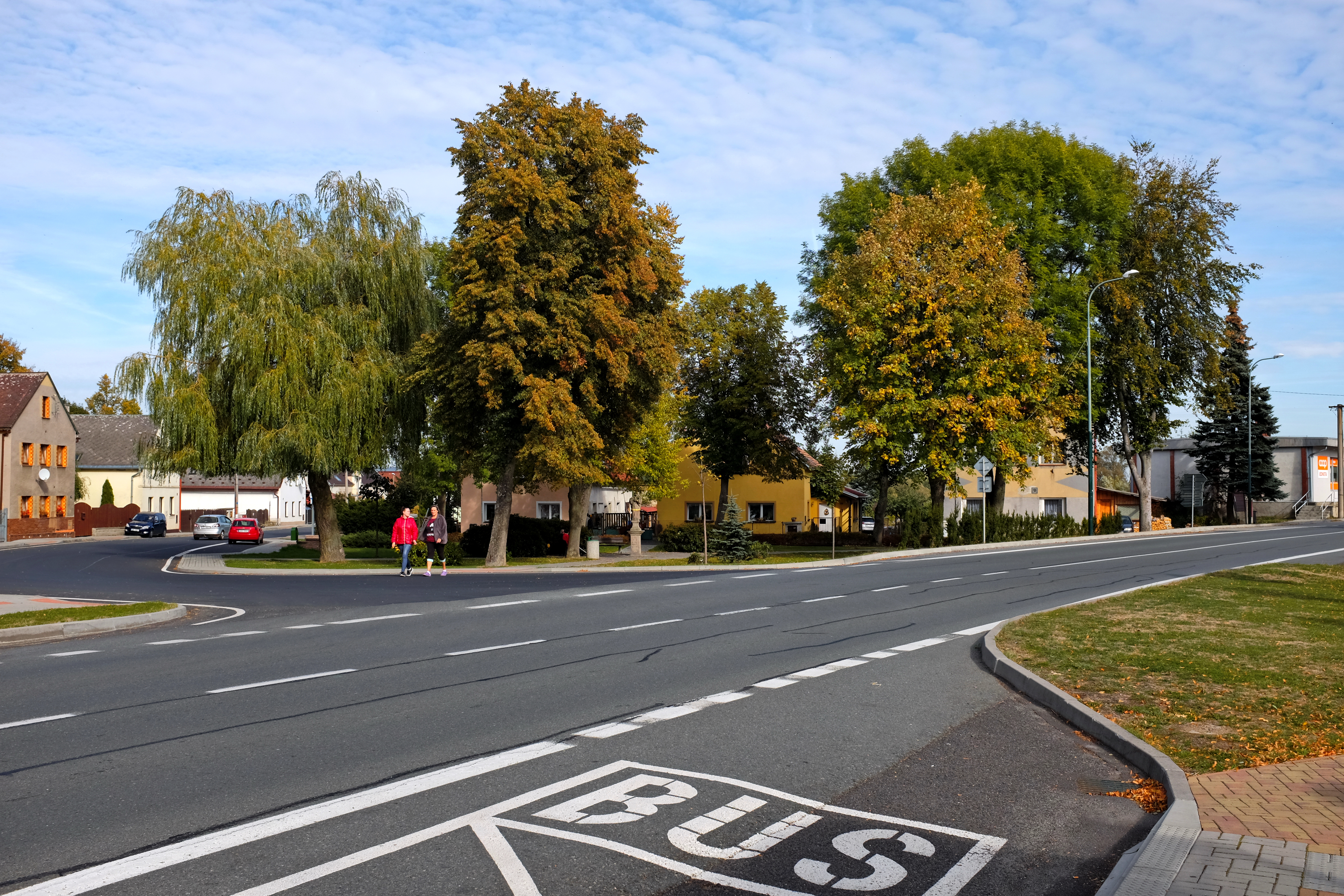
- Town square

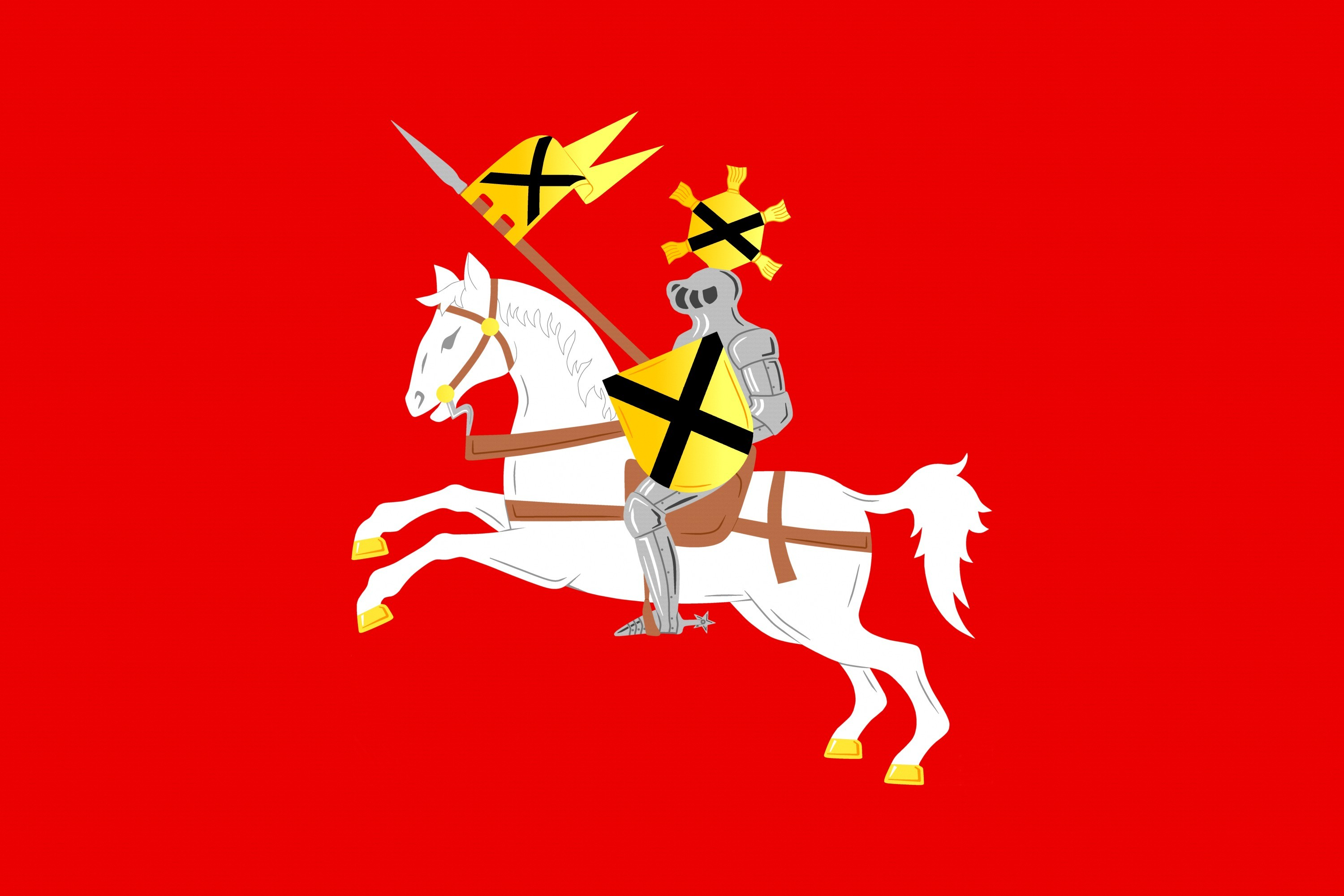
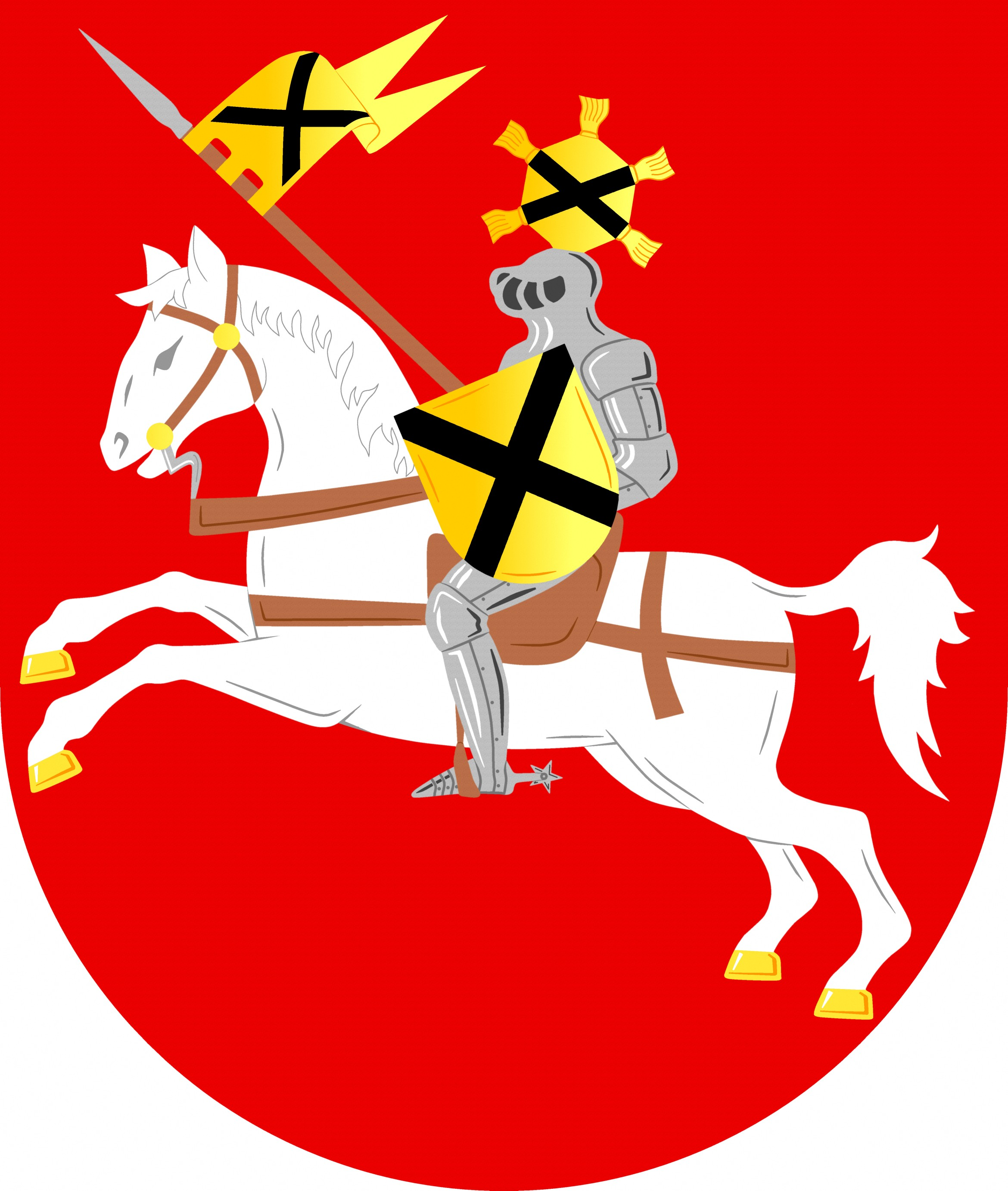
- Flag Coat of arms

- Location in the Czech Republic
- Coordinates: 50°4′21″N 12°55′17″E
- Country: Czech Republic
- Region: Karlovy Vary
- District: Karlovy Vary
- Founded: 1488

Government
  - Mayor: Martin Frank

Area
  - Total: 9.16 km^{2} (3.54 sq mi)
- Elevation: 638 m (2,093 ft)

Population (2026-01-01)
  - Total: 389
  - Density: 42.5/km^{2} (110/sq mi)
- Time zone: UTC+1 (CET)
  - Summer (DST): UTC+2 (CEST)
- Postal code: 364 01
- Website: www.krasneudoli.cz

Krásné Údolí (Czech pronunciation: [ˈkraːsnɛː ˈuːdoliː]; German: Schönthal) is a town in Karlovy Vary District in the Karlovy Vary Region of the Czech Republic. It has about 400 inhabitants.

== Administrative division ==
Krásné Údolí consists of two municipal parts (in brackets population according to the 2021 census):

- Krásné Údolí (324)
- Odolenovice (55)

== Etymology ==
The name literally means 'beautiful valley' in both Czech and German and refers to its location. According to legend, this is how King Vladislaus II described the place when he was there hunting.

== Geography ==
Krásné Údolí is located about 18 kilometres (11 mi) south of Karlovy Vary. The southeastern part of the municipal territory with the town proper lies in the Teplá Highlands. The northwestern part lies in the Slavkov Forest. The highest point is the hill U Odolenovických hranic at 739 m (2,425 ft) above sea level. Most of the municipal territory lies within the Slavkov Forest Protected Landscape Area.

== History ==
Krásné Údolí was founded in 1488 on the site of an abolished village called Schickenplatz. It was founded by Henry III of Plauen on his Toužim estate. Soon Toužim became the economic centre of the estate and the development of Krásné Údolí stopped.

== Demographics ==
Historical population

Year	Pop.	±%
1869	770	—
1880	820	+6.5%
1890	774	−5.6%
1900	760	−1.8%
1910	716	−5.8%

Year	Pop.	±%
1921	653	−8.8%
1930	607	−7.0%
1950	268	−55.8%
1961	306	+14.2%
1970	422	+37.9%

Year	Pop.	±%
1980	532	+26.1%
1991	451	−15.2%
2001	442	−2.0%
2011	434	−1.8%
2021	379	−12.7%

Source: Censuses

== Economy ==
Krásné Údolí is home of the dairy company Hollandia. It was founded 1991. It became one of the largest Czech yoghurt producers.

== Transport ==
The I/20 road (part of the European route E49) from Plzeň to Karlovy Vary runs through Krásné Údolí.

== Sights ==
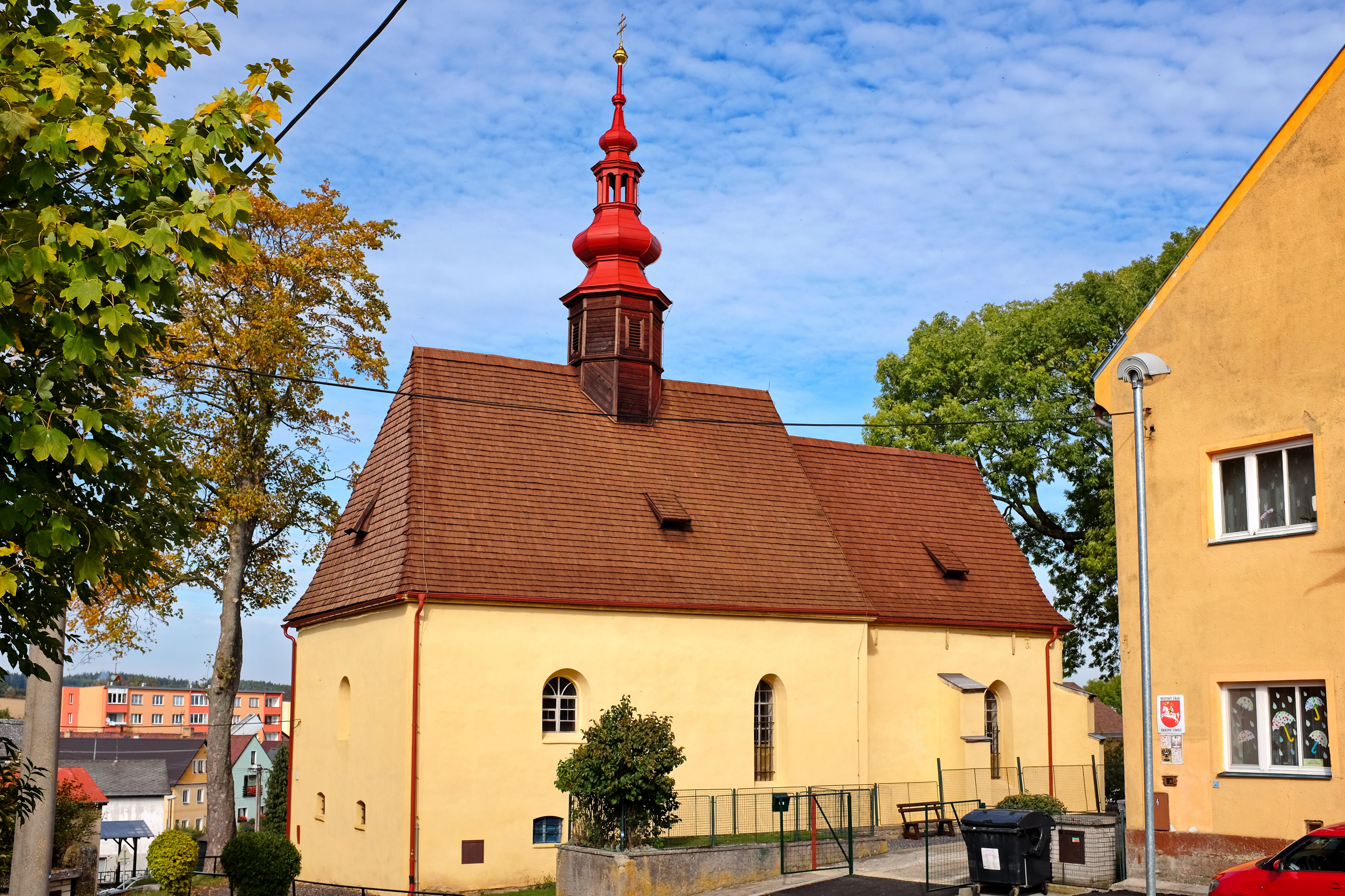
Church of Saint Lawrence

The main landmark of Krásné Údolí is the Church of Saint Lawrence. It was built in the late Gothic style probably in the second half of the 15th century. Its current appearance is the result of a Baroque reconstruction.
