= Čichalov =

- Municipality
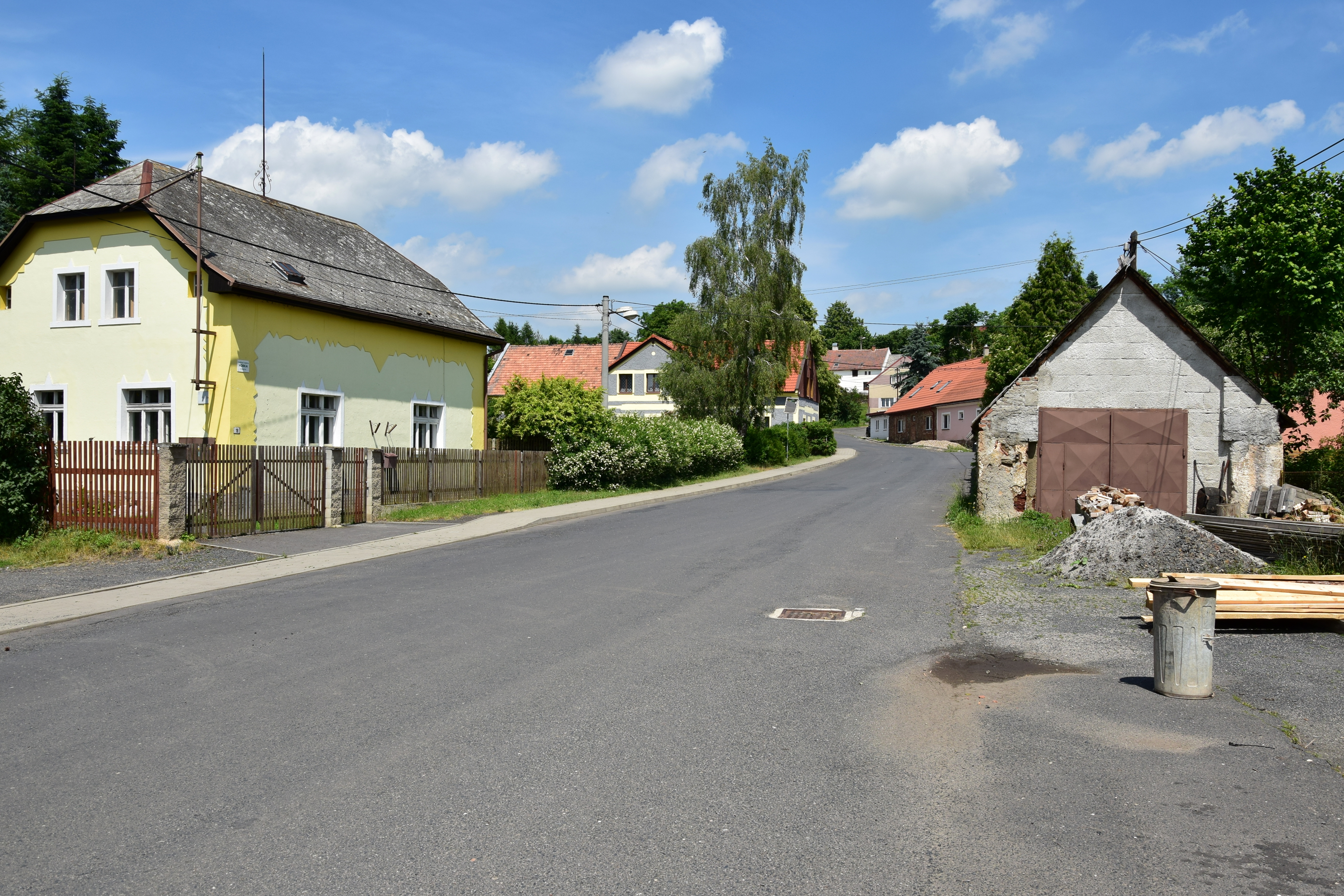
- Centre of Čichalov

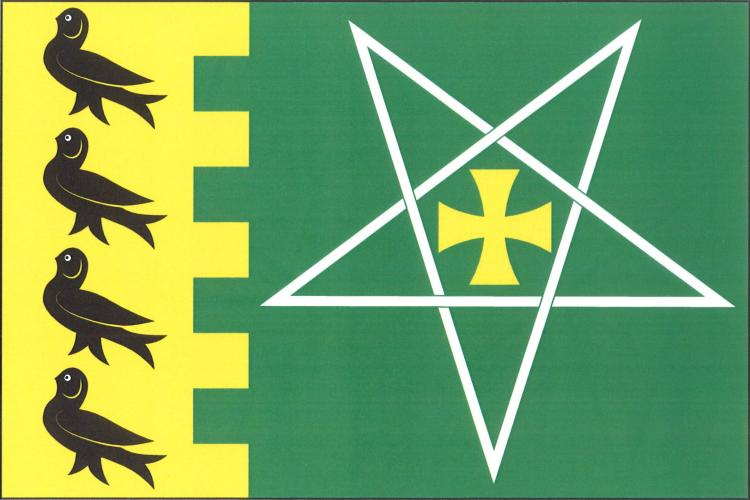
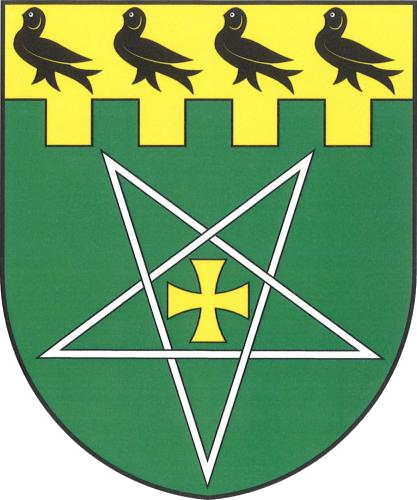
- Flag Coat of arms

- Location in the Czech Republic
- Coordinates: 50°7′28″N 13°10′16″E
- Country: Czech Republic
- Region: Karlovy Vary
- District: Karlovy Vary
- First mentioned: 1386

Area
  - Total: 12.83 km^{2} (4.95 sq mi)
- Elevation: 595 m (1,952 ft)

Population (2026-01-01)
  - Total: 158
  - Density: 12.3/km^{2} (31.9/sq mi)
- Time zone: UTC+1 (CET)
  - Summer (DST): UTC+2 (CEST)
- Postal codes: 364 52, 364 53
- Website: www.cichalov.cz

Čichalov (German: Sichlau) is a municipality and village in Karlovy Vary District in the Karlovy Vary Region of the Czech Republic. It has about 200 inhabitants.

== Administrative division ==
Čichalov consists of four municipal parts (in brackets population according to the 2021 census):

- Čichalov (110)
- Kovářov (7)
- Mokrá (39)
- Štoutov (8)

== Demographics ==
Historical population
Year	Pop.	±%
1869	580	—
1880	596	+2.8%
1890	582	−2.3%
1900	562	−3.4%
1910	541	−3.7%
1921	494	−8.7%
1930	499	+1.0%
1950	292	−41.5%
1961	238	−18.5%
1970	305	+28.2%
1980	224	−26.6%
1991	175	−21.9%
2001	163	−6.9%
2011	151	−7.4%
2021	164	+8.6%
Source: Censuses
