= Pšov =

- Municipality
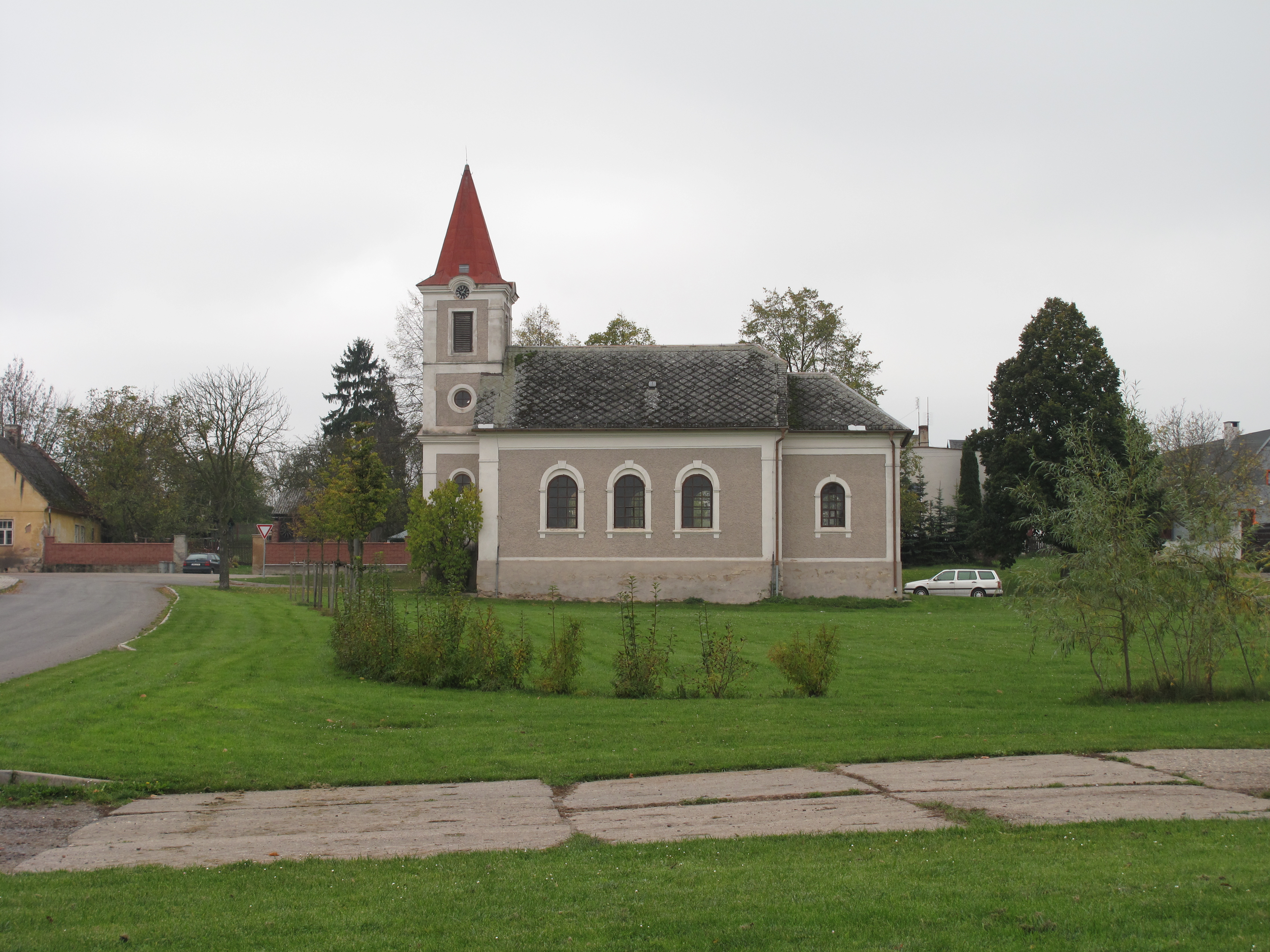
- Chapel of the Sacred Heart

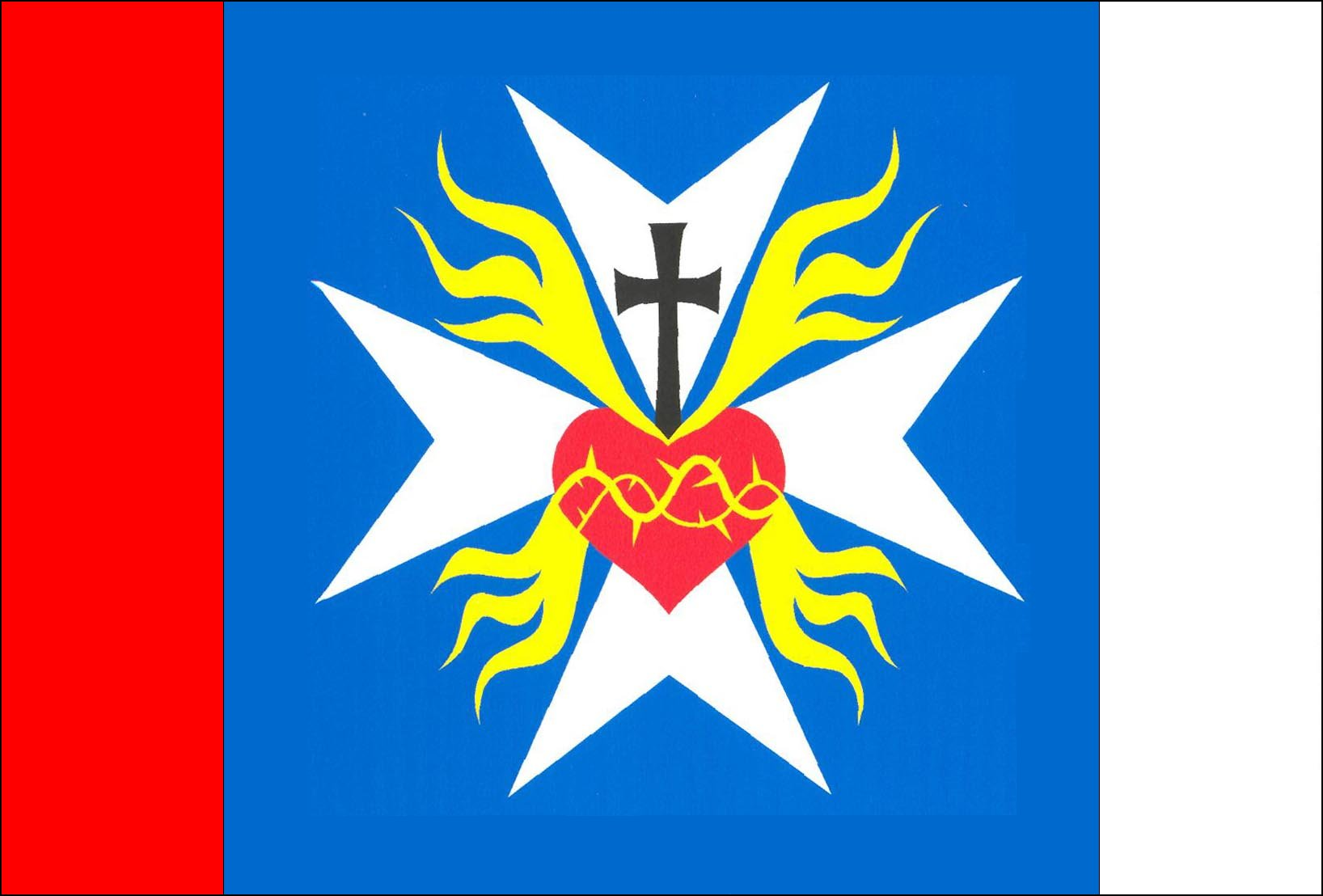
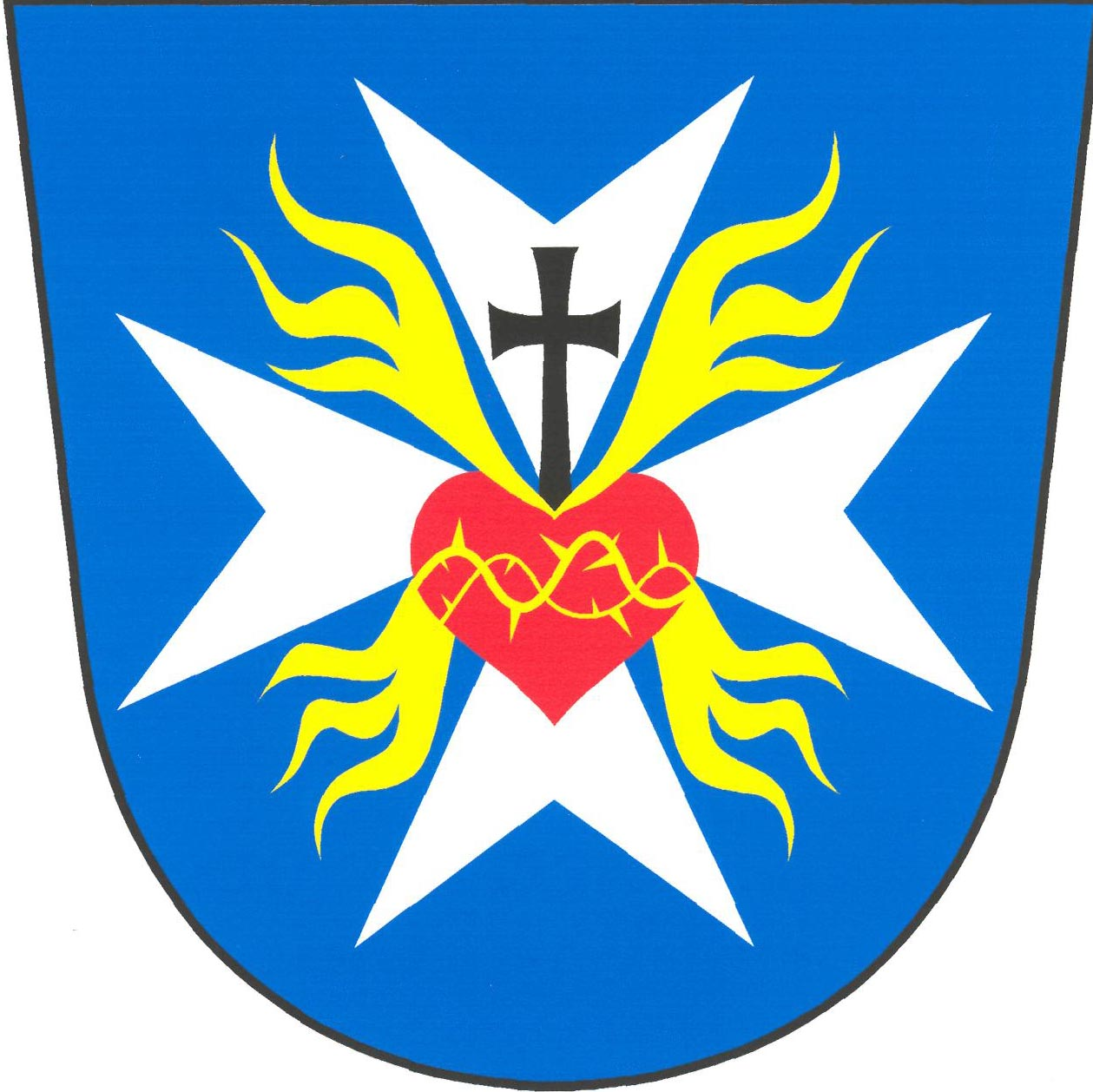
- Flag Coat of arms

- Location in the Czech Republic
- Coordinates: 50°3′6″N 13°10′15″E
- Country: Czech Republic
- Region: Karlovy Vary
- District: Karlovy Vary
- First mentioned: 1513

Area
  - Total: 48.70 km^{2} (18.80 sq mi)
- Elevation: 526 m (1,726 ft)

Population (2026-01-01)
  - Total: 595
  - Density: 12.2/km^{2} (31.6/sq mi)
- Time zone: UTC+1 (CET)
  - Summer (DST): UTC+2 (CEST)
- Postal code: 364 52
- Website: www.psov.cz

Pšov (German: Schaub) is a municipality and village in Karlovy Vary District in the Karlovy Vary Region of the Czech Republic. It has about 600 inhabitants.

== Administrative division ==
Pšov consists of eight municipal parts (in brackets population according to the 2021 census):

- Pšov (122)
- Borek (23)
- Chlum (43)
- Kobylé (32)
- Kolešov (2)
- Močidlec (74)
- Novosedly (225)
- Semtěš (27)

== Demographics ==
Historical population
Year	Pop.	±%
1869	1,903	—
1880	2,000	+5.1%
1890	1,874	−6.3%
1900	1,758	−6.2%
1910	1,853	+5.4%
1921	1,894	+2.2%
1930	1,866	−1.5%
1950	864	−53.7%
1961	889	+2.9%
1970	857	−3.6%
1980	746	−13.0%
1991	629	−15.7%
2001	608	−3.3%
2011	578	−4.9%
2021	548	−5.2%
Source: Censuses

== Sights ==
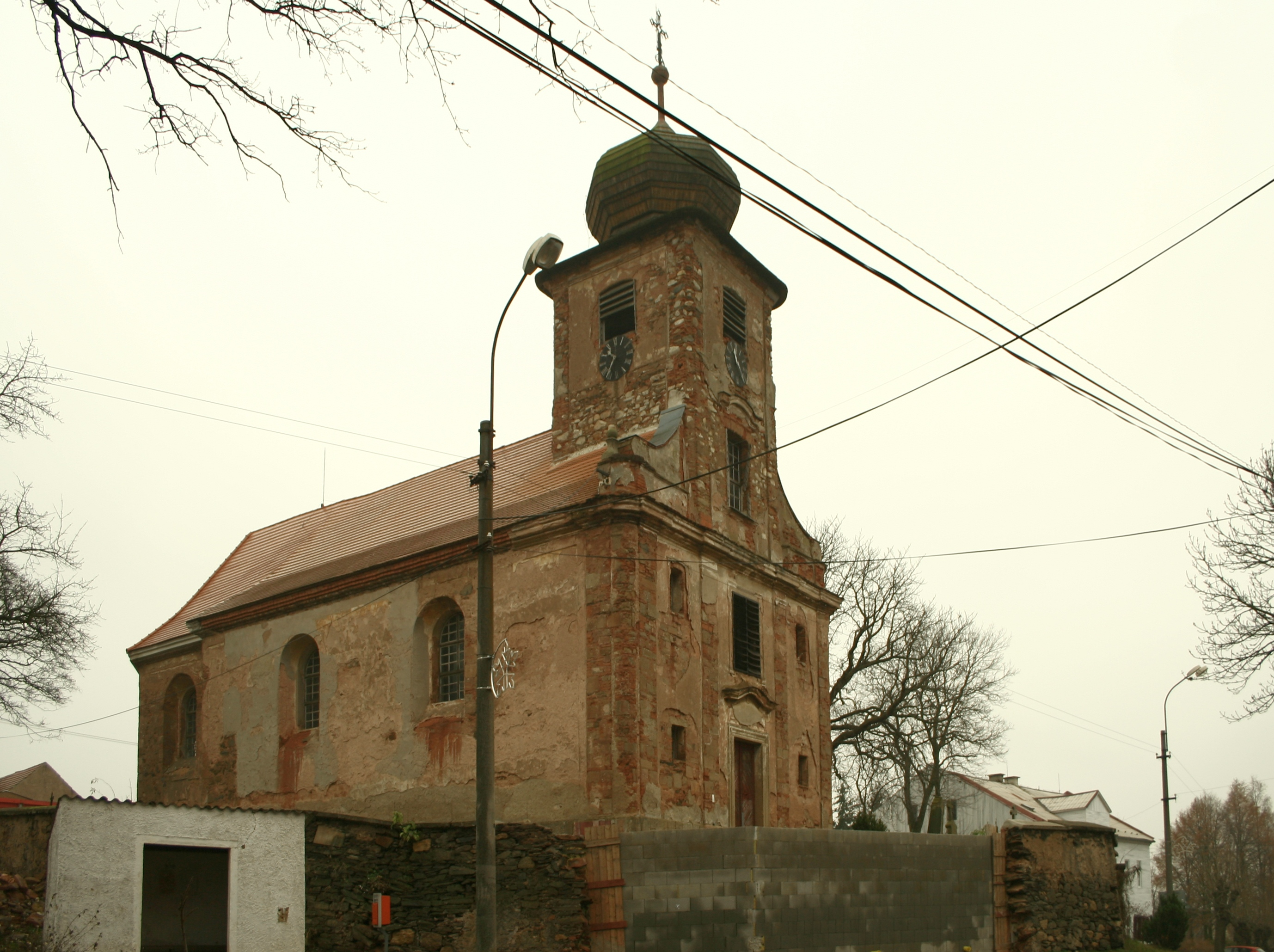
Church of Saint James the Great

The most important historical monuments in the municipality are the three churches. The Church of Saint Giles in Chlum was originally a Gothic building from the first half of the 14th century. In 1758, it was rebuilt in the Baroque style and the tower was added.

The Church of Saint James the Great is located in Močidlec. It was built in the late Baroque style in 1782, on the site of an older church.

The Church of the Assumption of the Virgin Mary is located in Kobylé. It was built in the early Gothic style in the second half of the 13th century and rebuilt in the Empire style in 1873.

The main landmark of the village of Pšov is the Chapel of the Sacred Heart. It dates from 1914.
