= Stráž nad Ohří =

- Municipality
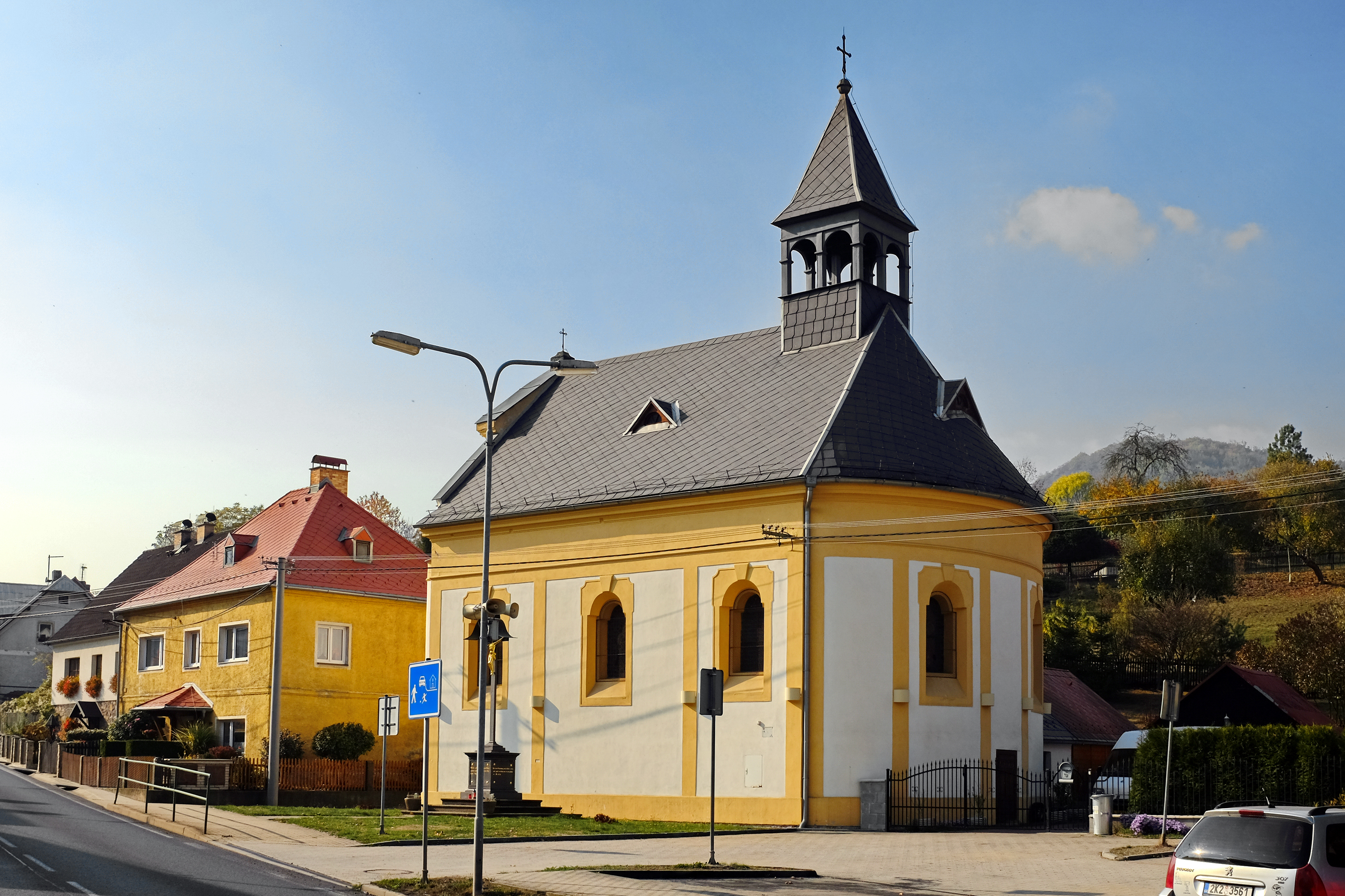
- Church of Saint Michael

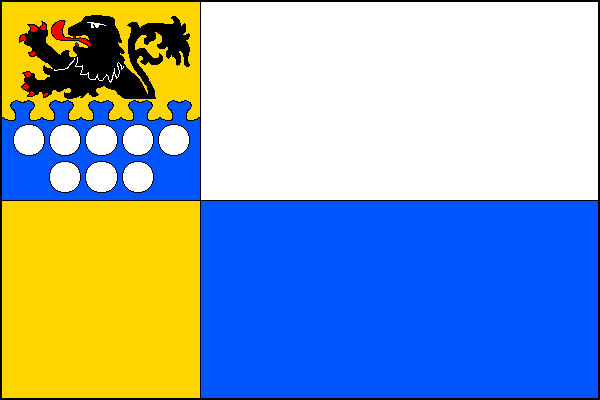
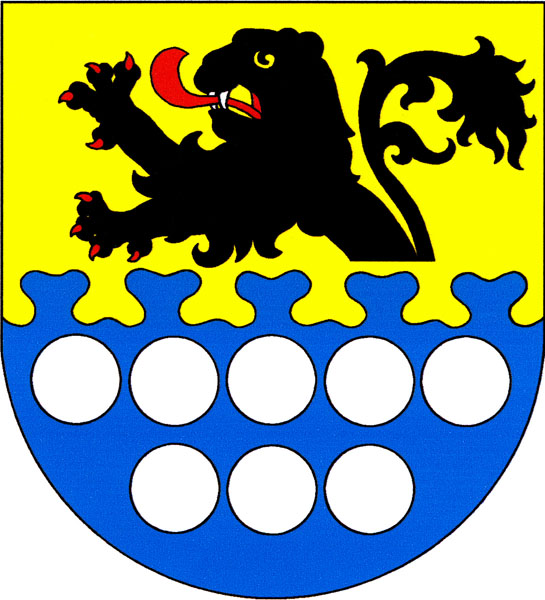
- Flag Coat of arms

- Location in the Czech Republic
- Coordinates: 50°20′14″N 13°3′4″E
- Country: Czech Republic
- Region: Karlovy Vary
- District: Karlovy Vary
- First mentioned: 1086

Area
  - Total: 29.24 km^{2} (11.29 sq mi)
- Elevation: 328 m (1,076 ft)

Population (2026-01-01)
  - Total: 565
  - Density: 19.3/km^{2} (50.0/sq mi)
- Time zone: UTC+1 (CET)
  - Summer (DST): UTC+2 (CEST)
- Postal codes: 363 01, 431 51
- Website: www.straznadohri.cz

Stráž nad Ohří (German: Warta) is a municipality and village in Karlovy Vary District in the Karlovy Vary Region of the Czech Republic. It has about 600 inhabitants.

== Administrative division ==
Stráž nad Ohří consists of nine municipal parts (in brackets population according to the 2021 census):

- Stráž nad Ohří (362)
- Boč (58)
- Kamenec (15)
- Korunní (39)
- Malý Hrzín (5)
- Osvinov (35)
- Peklo (3)
- Smilov (22)
- Srní (14)

== Etymology ==
The name Stráž means 'guard' in Czech. This name was often given to places that were used for guarding and from which it was possible to see well into the distance, or to places along rivers that served to keep watch so that no one passed without paying the toll. The suffix nad Ohří means 'upon the Ohře'.

== Demographics ==
Historical population
Year	Pop.	±%
1869	1,957	—
1880	1,926	−1.6%
1890	2,008	+4.3%
1900	2,098	+4.5%
1910	2,317	+10.4%
1921	2,194	−5.3%
1930	2,299	+4.8%
1950	1,038	−54.8%
1961	1,087	+4.7%
1970	860	−20.9%
1980	740	−14.0%
1991	589	−20.4%
2001	624	+5.9%
2011	589	−5.6%
2021	553	−6.1%
Source: Censuses
