= Útvina =

- Municipality
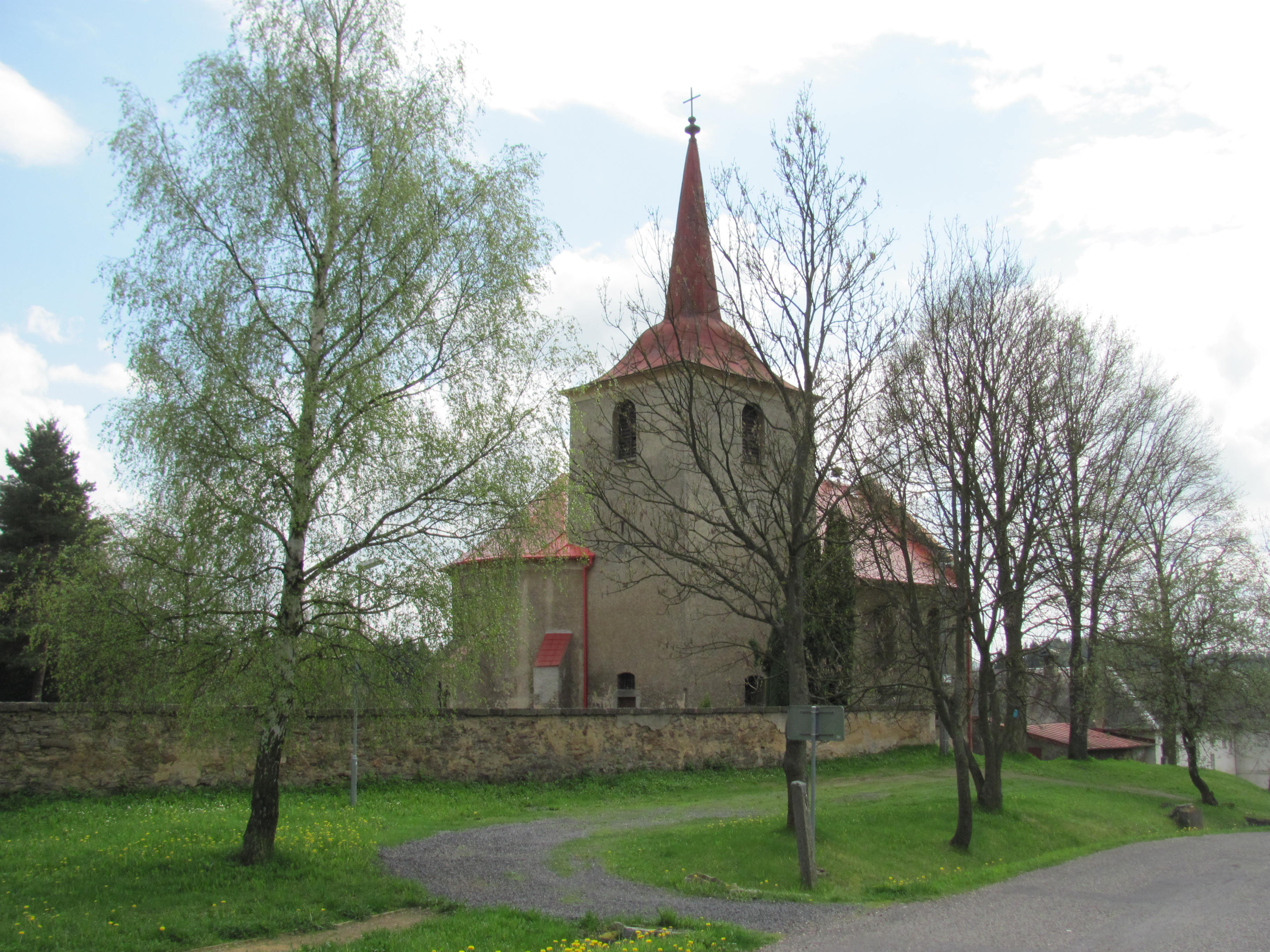
- Church of Saint Vitus

- Flag Coat of arms

- Location in the Czech Republic
- Coordinates: 50°4′15″N 12°57′17″E
- Country: Czech Republic
- Region: Karlovy Vary
- District: Karlovy Vary
- First mentioned: 1214

Area
  - Total: 37.83 km^{2} (14.61 sq mi)
- Elevation: 595 m (1,952 ft)

Population (2026-01-01)
  - Total: 590
  - Density: 16/km^{2} (40/sq mi)
- Time zone: UTC+1 (CET)
  - Summer (DST): UTC+2 (CEST)
- Postal code: 364 01
- Website: www.utvina.cz

Útvina (German: Uitwa, Uittwa) is a municipality and village in Karlovy Vary District in the Karlovy Vary Region of the Czech Republic. It has about 600 inhabitants.

== Administrative division ==
Útvina consists of six municipal parts (in brackets population according to the 2021 census):

- Útvina (432)
- Český Chloumek (11)
- Chylice (46)
- Přílezy (68)
- Sedlo (43)
- Svinov (7)

== Demographics ==
Historical population
Year	Pop.	±%
1869	1,954	—
1880	2,011	+2.9%
1890	1,929	−4.1%
1900	1,835	−4.9%
1910	1,856	+1.1%
1921	1,864	+0.4%
1930	1,820	−2.4%
1950	830	−54.4%
1961	633	−23.7%
1970	582	−8.1%
1980	536	−7.9%
1991	476	−11.2%
2001	547	+14.9%
2011	594	+8.6%
2021	607	+2.2%
Source: Censuses

== Transport ==
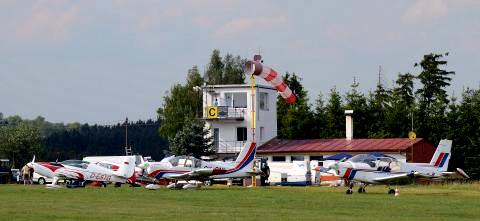
Aeroklub Toužim Airport

The highest airport in the Czech Republic is located in the municipal territory. It is a small airport for sport flying.
