= Štědrá =

- Municipality
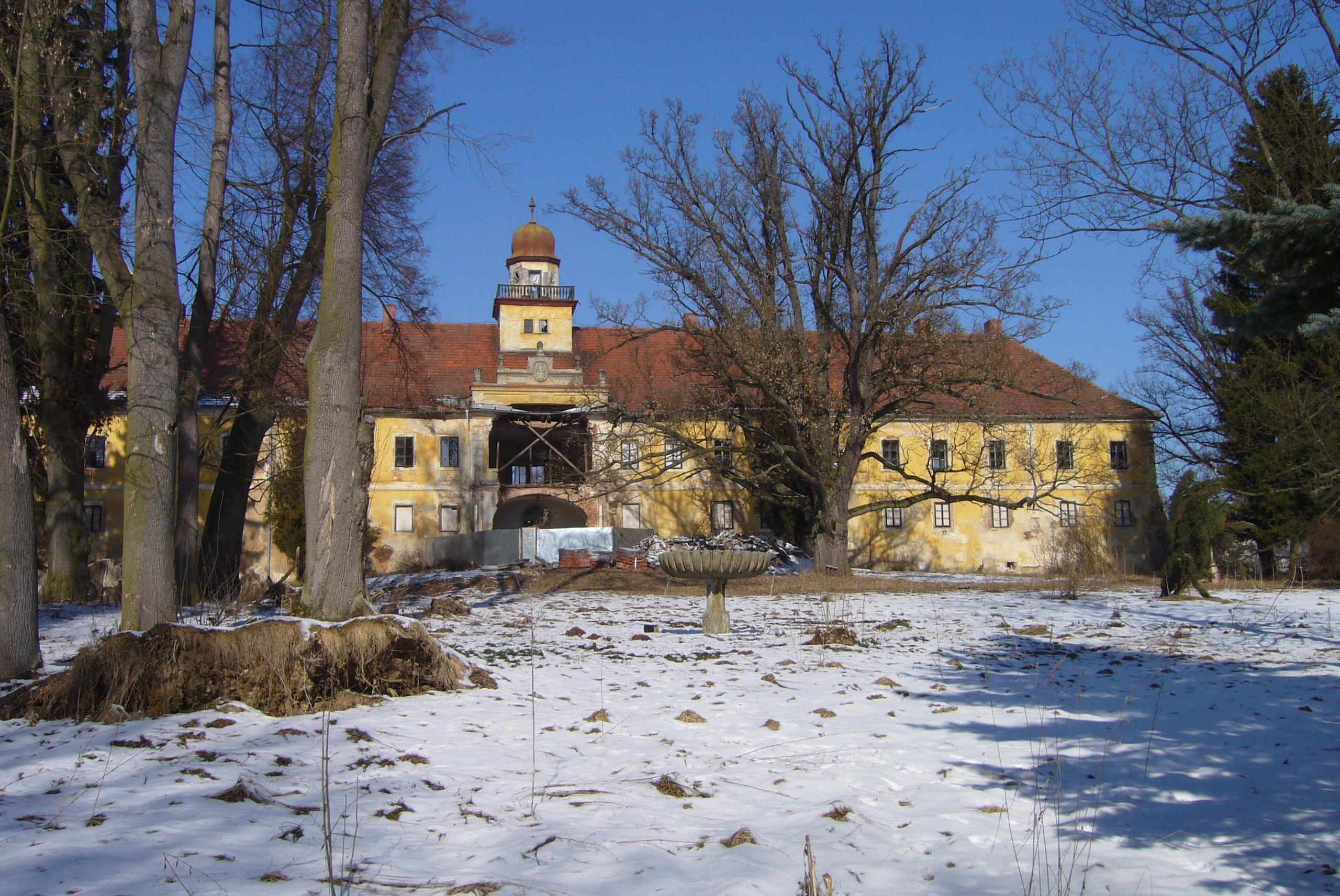
- Štědrá Castle

- Flag Coat of arms

- Location in the Czech Republic
- Coordinates: 50°3′30″N 13°6′51″E
- Country: Czech Republic
- Region: Karlovy Vary
- District: Karlovy Vary
- First mentioned: 1239

Area
  - Total: 36.56 km^{2} (14.12 sq mi)
- Elevation: 583 m (1,913 ft)

Population (2026-01-01)
  - Total: 543
  - Density: 14.9/km^{2} (38.5/sq mi)
- Time zone: UTC+1 (CET)
  - Summer (DST): UTC+2 (CEST)
- Postal code: 364 52
- Website: www.stedra.cz

Štědrá (German: Stiedra) is a municipality and village in Karlovy Vary District in the Karlovy Vary Region of the Czech Republic. It has about 500 inhabitants.

== Administrative division ==
Štědrá consists of eight municipal parts (in brackets population according to the 2021 census):

- Štědrá (234)
- Brložec (41)
- Domašín (9)
- Lažany (79)
- Mostec (4)
- Prohoř (43)
- Přestání (8)
- Zbraslav (70)

== Demographics ==
Historical population
Year	Pop.	±%
1869	1,725	—
1880	1,630	−5.5%
1890	1,666	+2.2%
1900	1,648	−1.1%
1910	1,658	+0.6%
1921	1,713	+3.3%
1930	1,675	−2.2%
1950	887	−47.0%
1961	875	−1.4%
1970	769	−12.1%
1980	675	−12.2%
1991	604	−10.5%
2001	571	−5.5%
2011	514	−10.0%
2021	488	−5.1%
Source: Censuses
