= Karlovy Vary District =

District in Karlovy Vary Region, Czech Republic

Karlovy Vary District Okres Karlovy Vary
- District
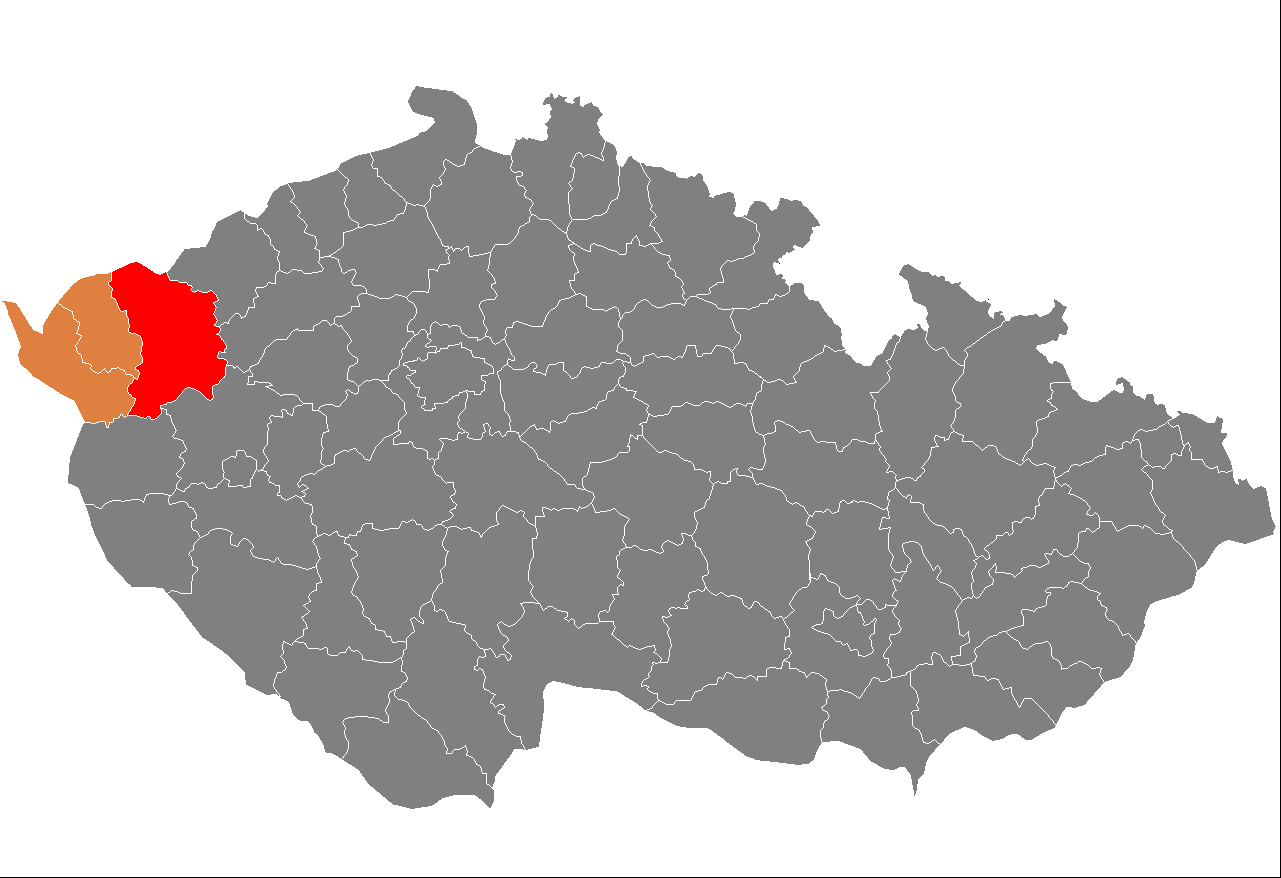
- Location in the Karlovy Vary Region within the Czech Republic
- Coordinates: 50°14′N 12°59′E
- Country: Czech Republic
- Region: Karlovy Vary
- Capital: Karlovy Vary

Area
  - Total: 1,510.73 km^{2} (583.30 sq mi)

Population (2026)
  - Total: 114,178
  - Density: 75.5780/km^{2} (195.746/sq mi)
- Time zone: UTC+1 (CET)
  - Summer (DST): UTC+2 (CEST)
- Municipalities: 55
- * Cities and towns: 15
- * Market towns: 0

Karlovy Vary District (Czech: okres Karlovy Vary) is a district in the Karlovy Vary Region of the Czech Republic. Its capital is the city of Karlovy Vary.

== Administrative division ==
Karlovy Vary District is divided into two administrative districts of municipalities with extended competence: Karlovy Vary and Ostrov.

=== List of municipalities ===
Towns are marked in bold:

Abertamy - Andělská Hora - Bečov nad Teplou - Bochov - Boží Dar - Božičany - Bražec - Březová - Černava - Chodov - Chyše - Čichalov - Dalovice - Děpoltovice - Doupovské Hradiště – Hájek - Horní Blatná - Hory - Hroznětín - Jáchymov - Jenišov - Karlovy Vary - Kolová - Krásné Údolí - Krásný Les - Kyselka - Merklín - Mírová - Nejdek - Nová Role - Nové Hamry - Ostrov - Otovice - Otročín - Pernink - Pila - Potůčky - Pšov - Sadov - Šemnice - Smolné Pece - Stanovice - Štědrá - Stráž nad Ohří - Stružná - Teplá - Teplička - Toužim - Útvina - Valeč - Velichov - Verušičky - Vojkovice - Vrbice - Vysoká Pec - Žlutice

Part of the district area belongs to Hradiště Military Training Area.

== Geography ==
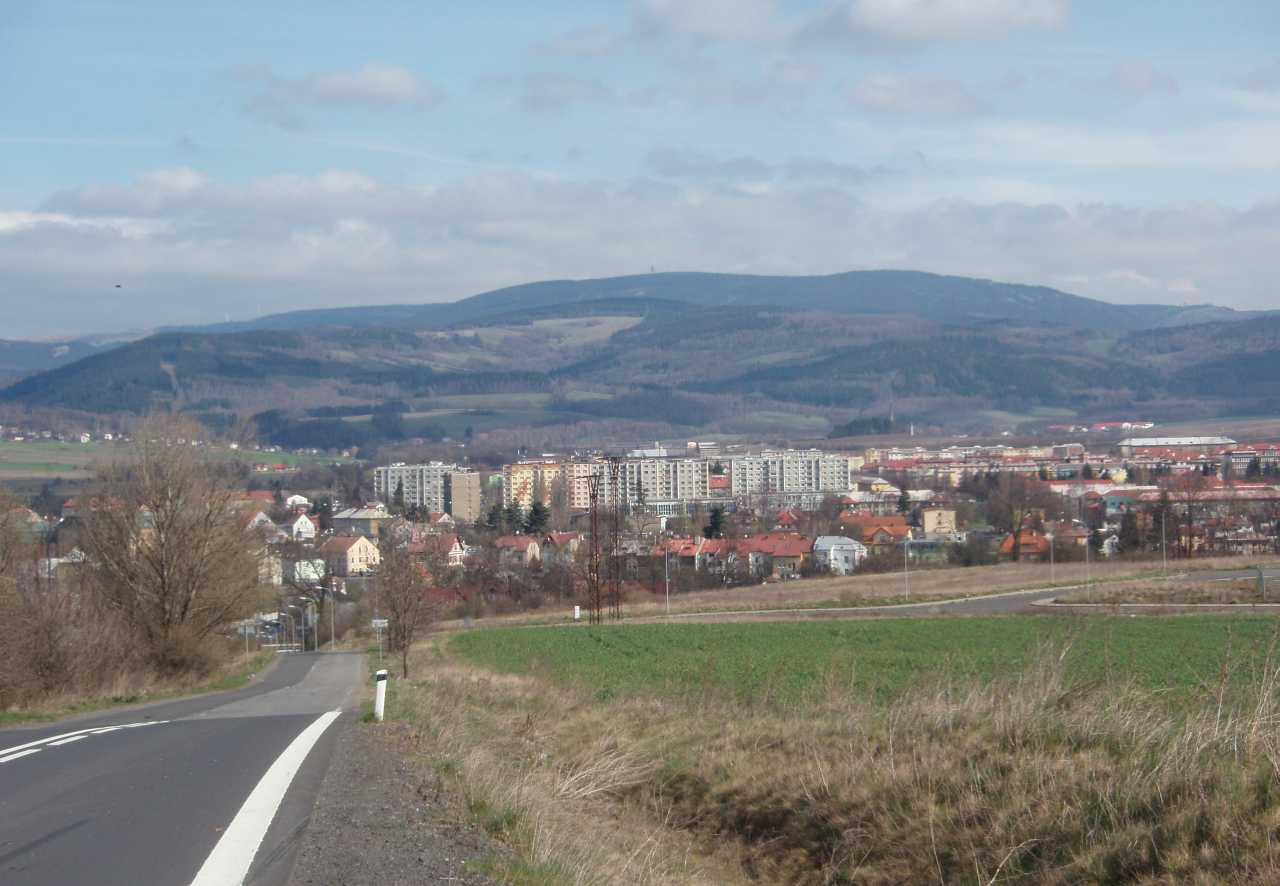
Ostrov with the Klínovec mountain in the background

Karlovy Vary District borders Germany in the north. The character of the terrain is very diverse, the landscape alternates between mountainous, hilly and slightly undulating. The territory extends into six geomorphological mesoregions: Ore Mountains (north), Doupov Mountains (east), Sokolov Basin (west), Slavkov Forest (west), Teplá Highlands (south) and Rakovník Uplands (small part in the southeast). The highest point of the district and the entire Karlovy Vary Region is the Klínovec mountain in Jáchymov with an elevation of 1,244 metres (4,081 ft). The lowest point is the river bed of the Ohře in Stráž nad Ohří at 305 m (1,001 ft).

From the total district area of 1,510.7 km^{2} (583.3 sq mi), agricultural land occupies 534.5 km^{2} (206.4 sq mi), forests occupy 651.3 km^{2} (251.5 sq mi), and water area occupies 26.5 km^{2} (10.2 sq mi). Forests cover 43.1% of the district's area.

The most important river is the Ohře, which flows across the territory from west to northeast. Its longest tributaries within the district are the rivers Teplá and Rolava. The southern part of the district is drained by the Střela. The district is also crossed by the Schwarzwasser (here called Černá) in the north. There are no significant bodies of water. The largest body of water is the Žlutice Reservoir.

There is one protected landscape area, located in the west of the district: Slavkovský les.

== Demographics ==
Historical population

Year	Pop.	±%
1869	121,518	—
1880	135,860	+11.8%
1890	144,443	+6.3%
1900	165,241	+14.4%
1910	181,759	+10.0%

Year	Pop.	±%
1921	173,848	−4.4%
1930	192,522	+10.7%
1950	102,310	−46.9%
1961	119,926	+17.2%
1970	122,305	+2.0%

Year	Pop.	±%
1980	126,086	+3.1%
1991	119,506	−5.2%
2001	118,869	−0.5%
2011	115,415	−2.9%
2021	108,705	−5.8%

Source: Censuses

=== Most populous municipalities ===
Name	Population	Area (km^{2})
Karlovy Vary	48,788	59
Ostrov	15,615	50
Nejdek	7,647	52
Nová Role	4,298	14
Toužim	3,458	99
Jáchymov	2,248	51
Hroznětín	2,179	24
Žlutice	2,153	53
Dalovice	1,992	6
Bochov	1,876	96

== Economy ==
The largest employers with headquarters in Karlovy Vary District and at least 500 employees are:

Economic entity	Location	Number of employees	Main activity
Regional Hospital Karlovy Vary	Karlovy Vary	2,000–2,499	Health care
Regional Police Directorate of the Karlovy Vary Region	Karlovy Vary	1,000–1,499	Public order and safety activities
Witte Nejdek	Nejdek	1,000–1,499	Manufacture of locks and hinges
Léčebné lázně Jáchymov	Jáchymov	500–999	Health care
Mattoni 1873	Karlovy Vary	500–999	Manufacture of beverages
Vodárny a kanalizace Karlovy Vary	Karlovy Vary	500–999	Water collection, treatment and supply
Witte Access Technology	Ostrov	500–999	Manufacture of door handles

== Transport ==
The I/6 road, which is the unfinished section of the D6 motorway from Prague to Karlovy Vary and Cheb (part of the European route E48), passes through the district. The I/20 road (part of the European route E49) leads from Karlovy Vary to Plzeň.

Karlovy Vary Airport is located in the district. It is one of the six public international airports in the country.

== Sights ==
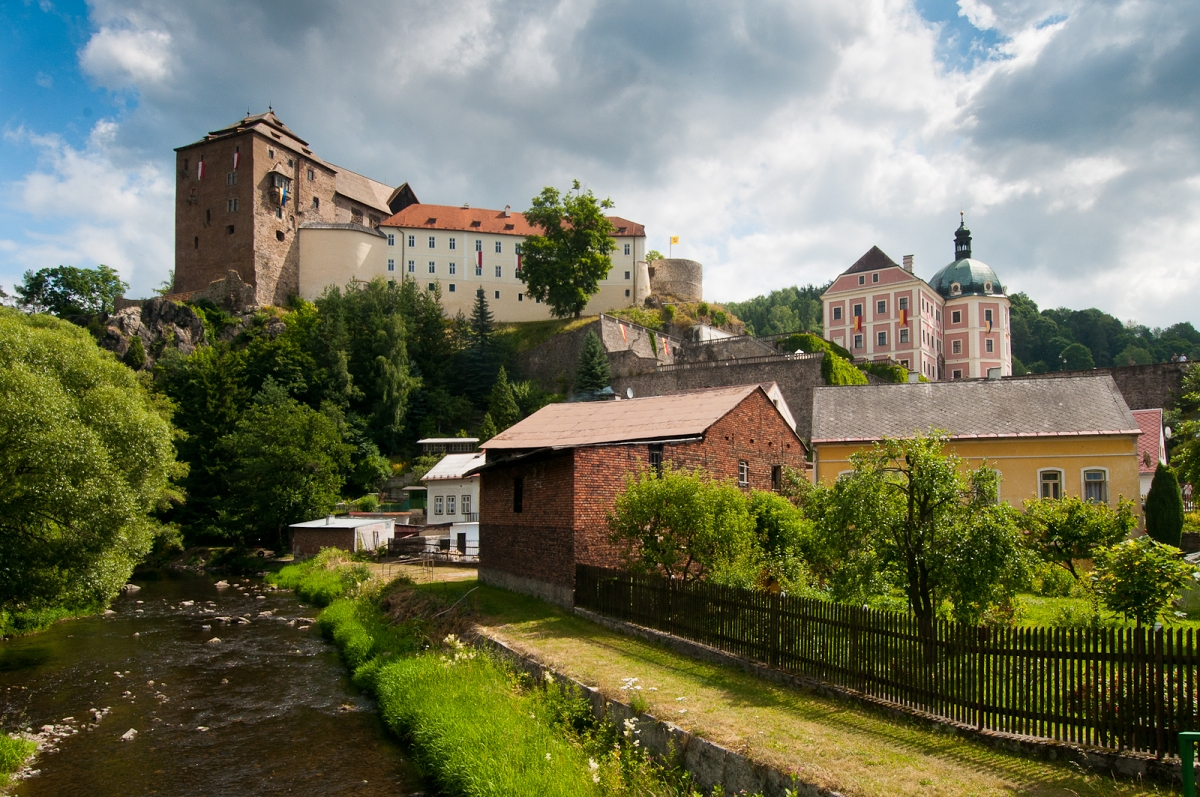
Bečov nad Teplou Castle

The Red Tower of Death in Ostrov, the mining cultural landscape Jáchymov and the mining cultural landscape Abertamy – Boží Dar – Horní Blatná were designated UNESCO World Heritage Sites in 2019 as parts of the transnational Ore Mountain Mining Region.

The historic city centre of Karlovy Vary with the spa cultural landscape was designated a UNESCO World Heritage Site in 2021 as part of the transnational Great Spa Towns of Europe because of its springs and architectural testimony to the popularity of spa towns in Europe during the 18th through 20th centuries.

The most important monuments in the district, protected as national cultural monuments, are:

- Bečov nad Teplou Castle
- Reliquary of St. Maurus
- Red Tower of Death in Ostrov
- Císařské lázně spa building in Karlovy Vary
- Church of Saint Mary Magdalene in Karlovy Vary
- Mint in Jáchymov
- Mauritius Mine in Abertamy
- Blatenský water ditch

The best-preserved settlements and landscapes, protected as monument reservations and monument zones, are:

- Karlovy Vary (monument reservation)
- Archaeological site in Karlovy Vary-Tašovice (monument reservation)
- Bečov nad Teplou
- Horní Blatná
- Jáchymov
- Ostrov
- Toužim
- Valeč
- Žlutice
- Kojšovice
- Kosmová
- Abertamy – Boží Dar – Horní Blatná – Mining Landscape
- Jáchymov Mining Landscape
- Bečovsko landscape
- Valečsko landscape

The most visited tourist destinations are the Motýlí dům tropical garden in Karlovy Vary, Bečov nad Teplou castle and chateau, Klínovec observation tower, Becherovka visitor's centre in Karlovy Vary, and botanical garden in Bečov nad Teplou.
