= Chodov (Karlovy Vary District) =

- Municipality
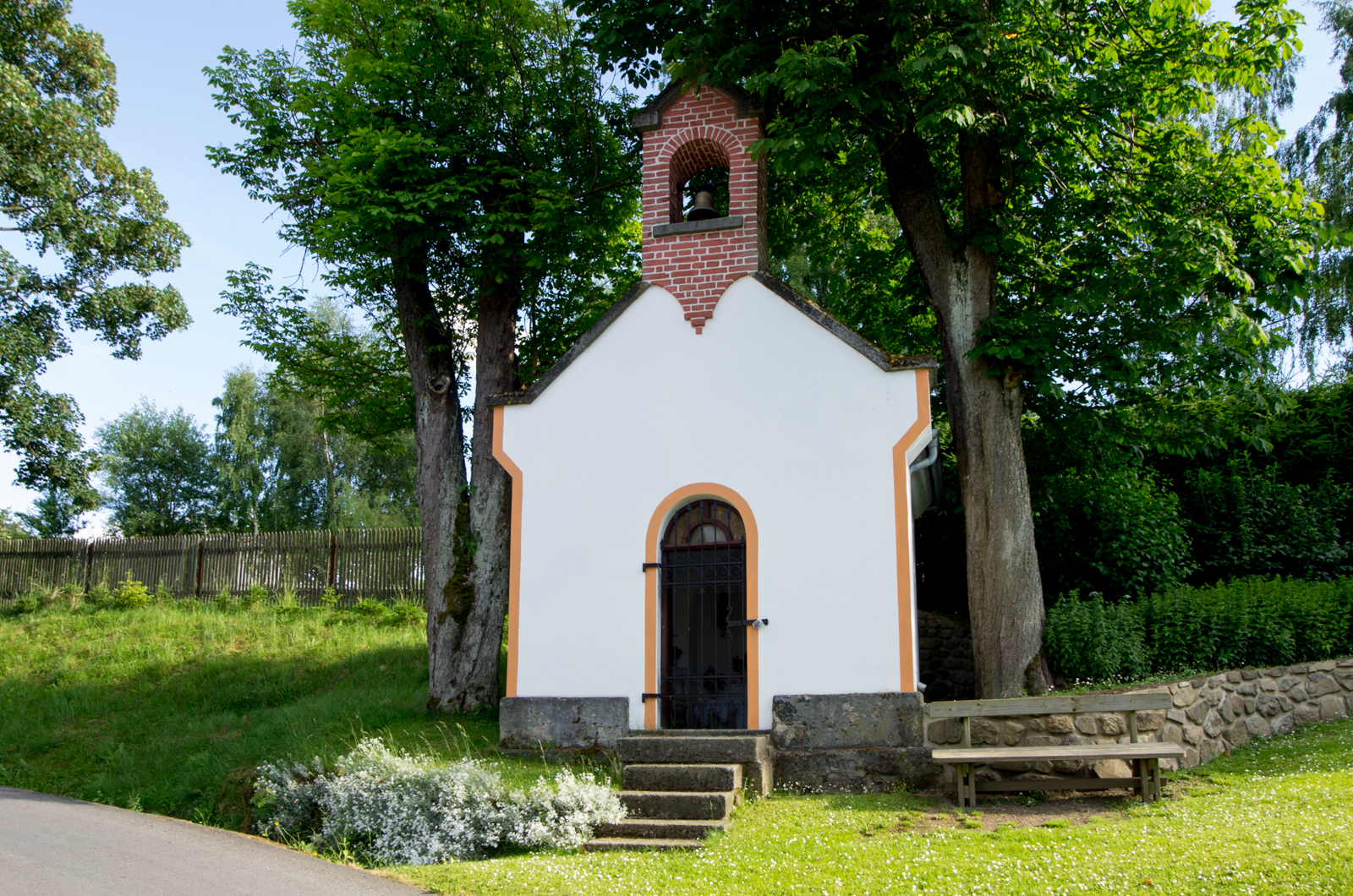
- Chapel of Saint Anne

- Location in the Czech Republic
- Coordinates: 50°4′7″N 12°51′47″E
- Country: Czech Republic
- Region: Karlovy Vary
- District: Karlovy Vary
- First mentioned: 1785

Area
  - Total: 8.16 km^{2} (3.15 sq mi)
- Elevation: 707 m (2,320 ft)

Population (2026-01-01)
  - Total: 129
  - Density: 15.8/km^{2} (40.9/sq mi)
- Time zone: UTC+1 (CET)
  - Summer (DST): UTC+2 (CEST)
- Postal code: 364 64
- Website: www.obec-chodov.cz

Chodov (German: Gängerhof) is a municipality and village in Karlovy Vary District in the Karlovy Vary Region of the Czech Republic. It has about 100 inhabitants.

== Demographics ==
Historical population
Year	Pop.	±%
1869	682	—
1880	664	−2.6%
1890	675	+1.7%
1900	630	−6.7%
1910	582	−7.6%
1921	527	−9.5%
1930	547	+3.8%
1950	191	−65.1%
1961	280	+46.6%
1970	186	−33.6%
1980	124	−33.3%
1991	113	−8.9%
2001	109	−3.5%
2011	105	−3.7%
2021	104	−1.0%
Source: Censuses
