= Merklín (Karlovy Vary District) =

- Municipality
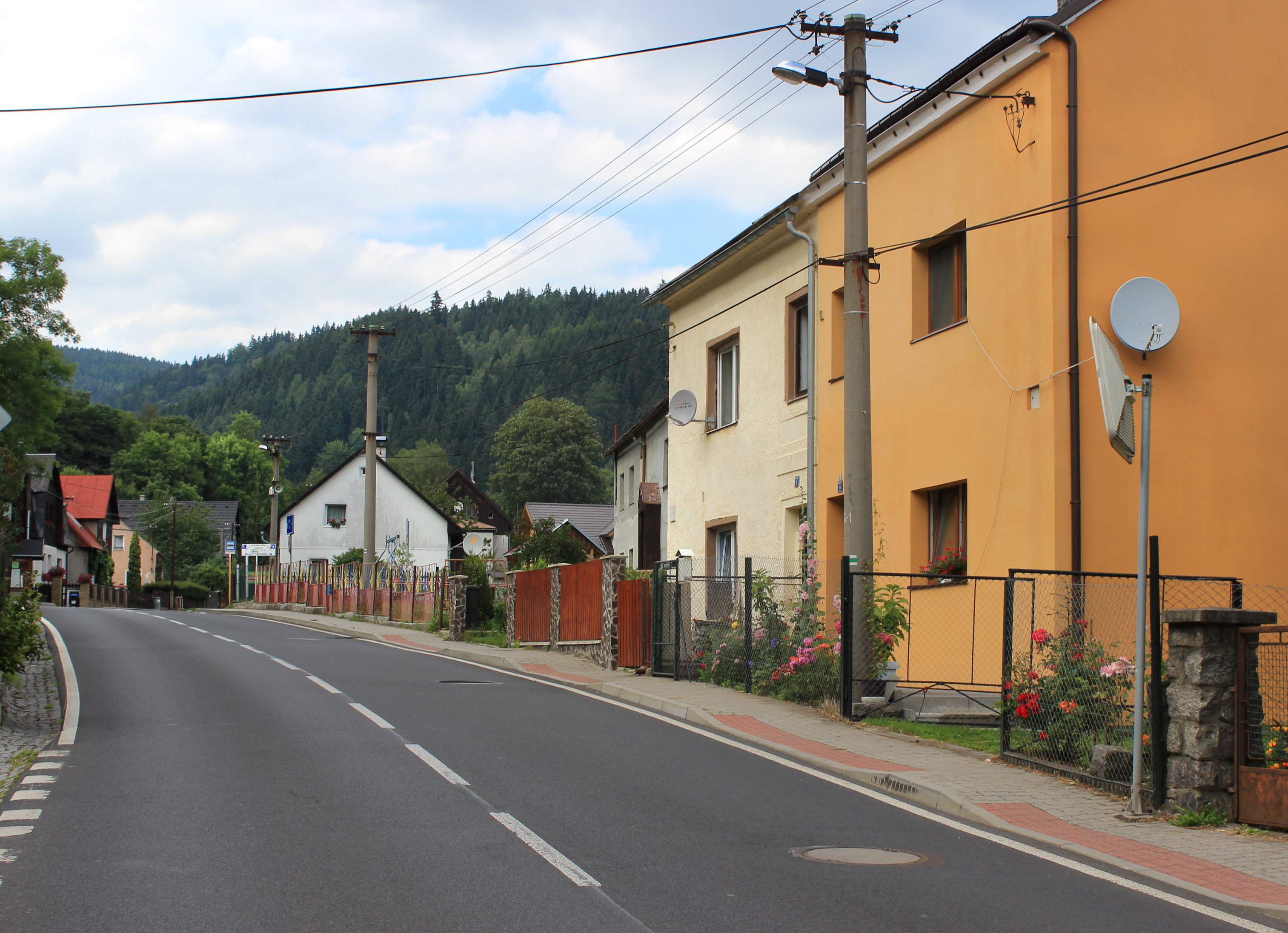
- Main street

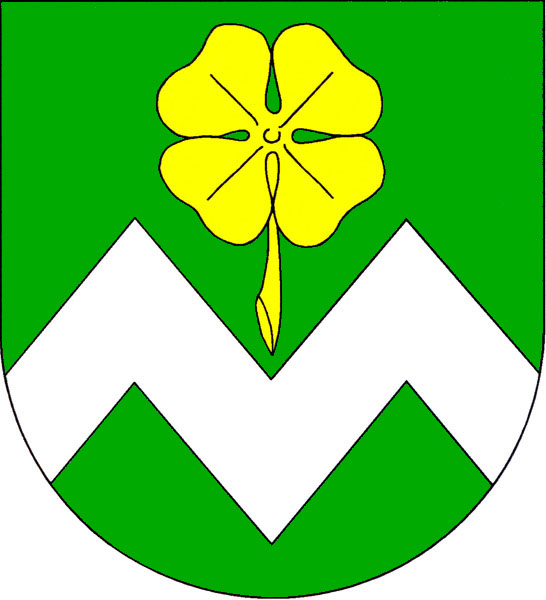
- Flag Coat of arms

- Location in the Czech Republic
- Coordinates: 50°19′41″N 12°51′49″E
- Country: Czech Republic
- Region: Karlovy Vary
- District: Karlovy Vary
- First mentioned: 1273

Area
  - Total: 23.41 km^{2} (9.04 sq mi)
- Elevation: 513 m (1,683 ft)

Population (2026-01-01)
  - Total: 888
  - Density: 37.9/km^{2} (98.2/sq mi)
- Time zone: UTC+1 (CET)
  - Summer (DST): UTC+2 (CEST)
- Postal codes: 362 34, 363 01
- Website: www.obecmerklin.cz

Merklín (German: Merkelsgrün) is a municipality and village in Karlovy Vary District in the Karlovy Vary Region of the Czech Republic. It has about 900 inhabitants.

== Administrative division ==
Merklín consists of four municipal parts (in brackets population according to the 2021 census):

- Merklín (746)
- Lípa (34)
- Oldřiš (36)
- Pstruží (74)

== Demographics ==
Historical population
Year	Pop.	±%
1869	766	—
1880	867	+13.2%
1890	1,060	+22.3%
1900	1,293	+22.0%
1910	1,585	+22.6%
1921	1,379	−13.0%
1930	1,506	+9.2%
1950	949	−37.0%
1961	869	−8.4%
1970	698	−19.7%
1980	913	+30.8%
1991	889	−2.6%
2001	1,102	+24.0%
2011	1,061	−3.7%
2021	890	−16.1%
Source: Censuses
