= Hájek (Karlovy Vary District) =

- Municipality
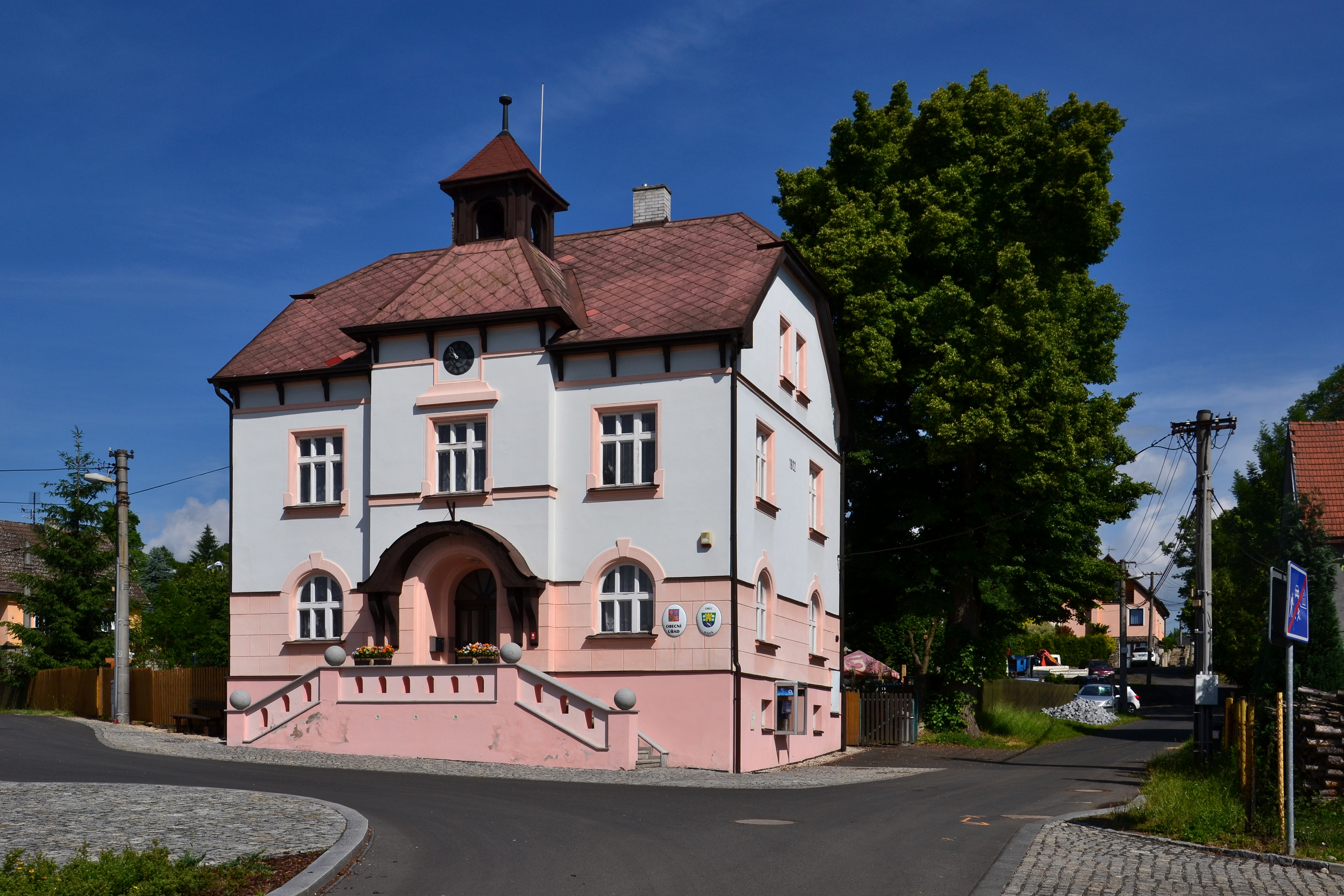
- Municipal office

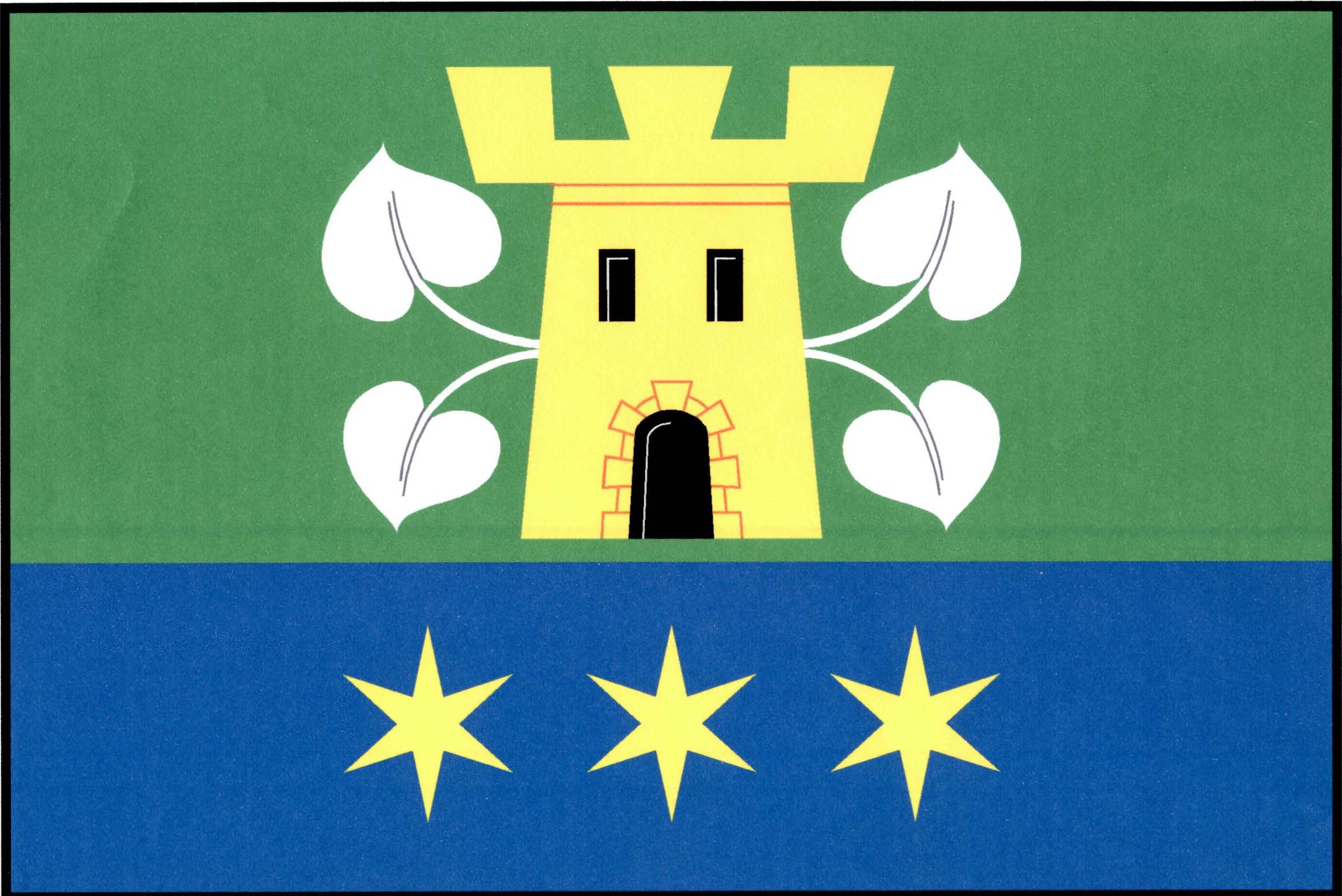
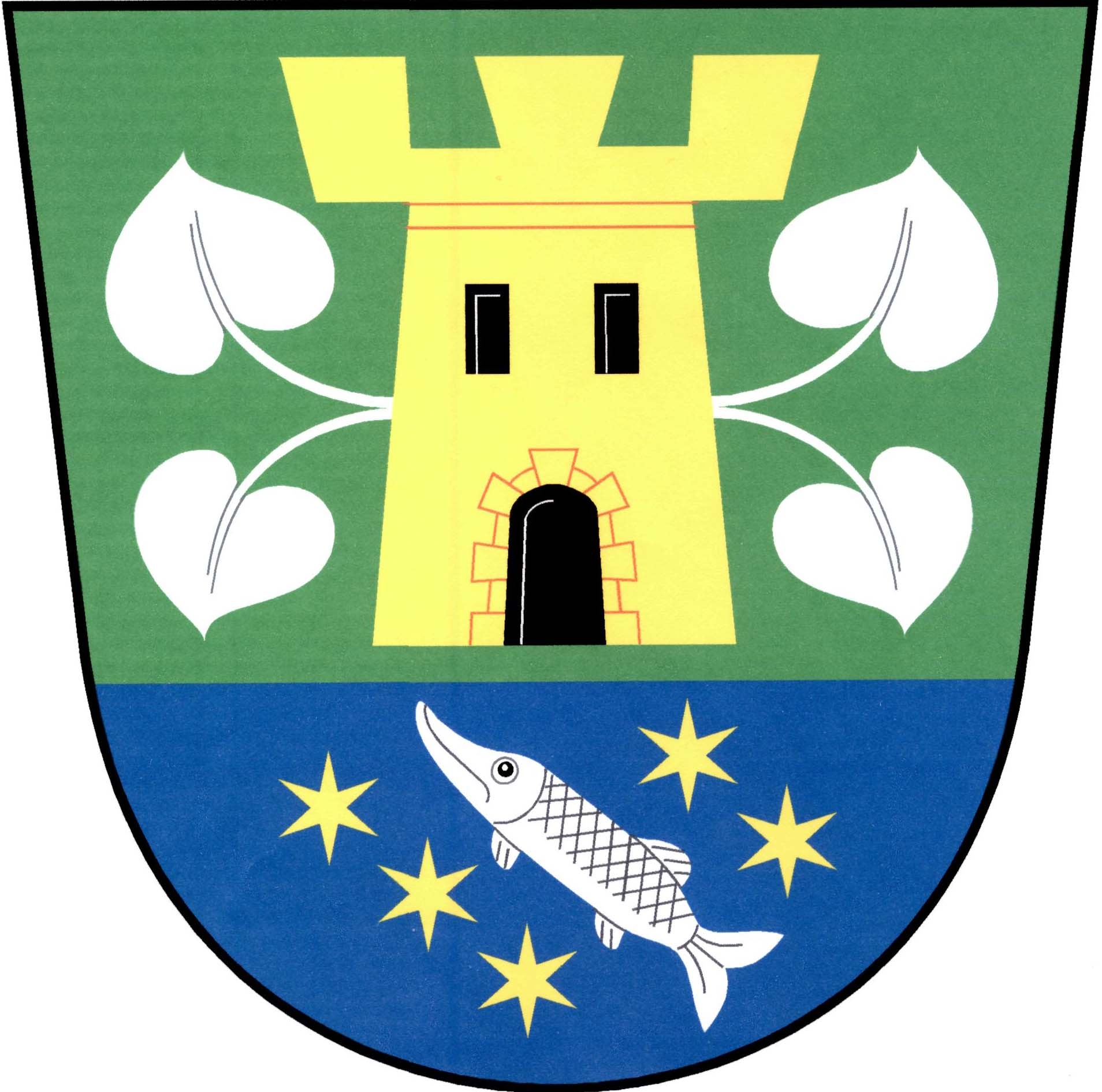
- Flag Coat of arms

- Location in the Czech Republic
- Coordinates: 50°17′0″N 12°55′11″E
- Country: Czech Republic
- Region: Karlovy Vary
- District: Karlovy Vary
- First mentioned: 1409

Area
  - Total: 8.75 km^{2} (3.38 sq mi)
- Elevation: 473 m (1,552 ft)

Population (2026-01-01)
  - Total: 643
  - Density: 73.5/km^{2} (190/sq mi)
- Time zone: UTC+1 (CET)
  - Summer (DST): UTC+2 (CEST)
- Postal code: 363 01
- Website: www.obechajek.cz

Hájek (German: Grasengrün) is a municipality and village in Karlovy Vary District in the Karlovy Vary Region of the Czech Republic. It has about 600 inhabitants.

== Administrative division ==
Hájek consists of two municipal parts (in brackets population according to the 2021 census):

- Hájek (572)
- Nová Víska (79)

== Demographics ==
Historical population
Year	Pop.	±%
1869	430	—
1880	514	+19.5%
1890	556	+8.2%
1900	663	+19.2%
1910	749	+13.0%
1921	652	−13.0%
1930	740	+13.5%
1950	452	−38.9%
1961	471	+4.2%
1970	389	−17.4%
1980	334	−14.1%
1991	348	+4.2%
2001	392	+12.6%
2011	490	+25.0%
2021	651	+32.9%
Source: Censuses
