= Černava =

- Municipality
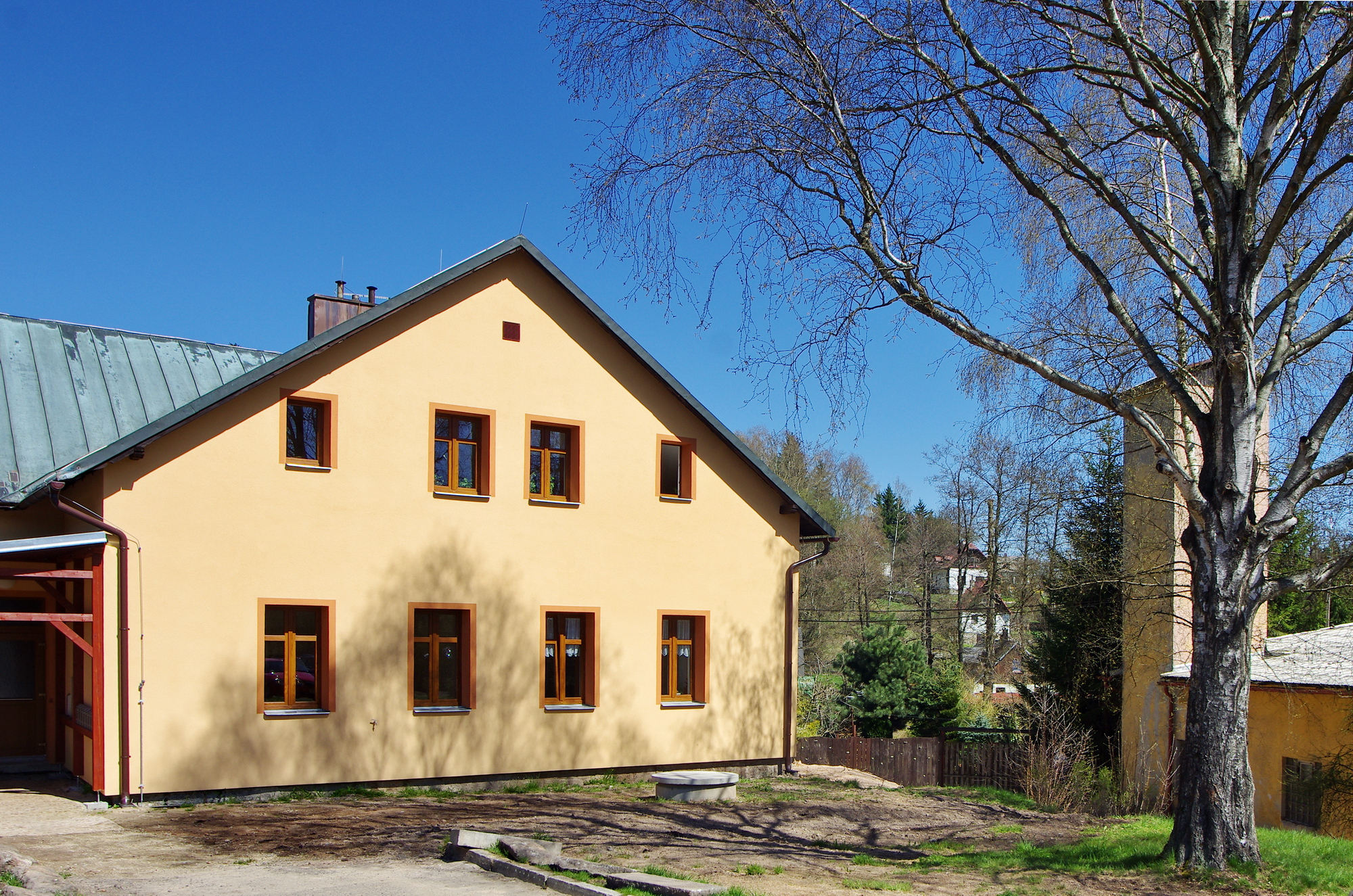
- Southern part of Černava

- Flag Coat of arms

- Location in the Czech Republic
- Coordinates: 50°17′29″N 12°42′40″E
- Country: Czech Republic
- Region: Karlovy Vary
- District: Karlovy Vary
- First mentioned: 1489

Area
  - Total: 7.07 km^{2} (2.73 sq mi)
- Elevation: 619 m (2,031 ft)

Population (2026-01-01)
  - Total: 308
  - Density: 43.6/km^{2} (113/sq mi)
- Time zone: UTC+1 (CET)
  - Summer (DST): UTC+2 (CEST)
- Postal code: 362 23
- Website: www.oucernava.cz

Černava (German: Schwarzenbach) is a municipality and village in Karlovy Vary District in the Karlovy Vary Region of the Czech Republic. It has about 300 inhabitants.

== Administrative division ==
Černava consists of two municipal parts (in brackets population according to the 2021 census):

- Černava (112)
- Rájec (185)

== Demographics ==
Historical population
Year	Pop.	±%
1869	1,011	—
1880	1,097	+8.5%
1890	1,138	+3.7%
1900	1,162	+2.1%
1910	1,239	+6.6%
1921	1,179	−4.8%
1930	1,330	+12.8%
1950	318	−76.1%
1961	333	+4.7%
1970	251	−24.6%
1980	214	−14.7%
1991	182	−15.0%
2001	223	+22.5%
2011	290	+30.0%
2021	297	+2.4%
Source: Censuses
