= Vrbice (Karlovy Vary District) =

- Municipality
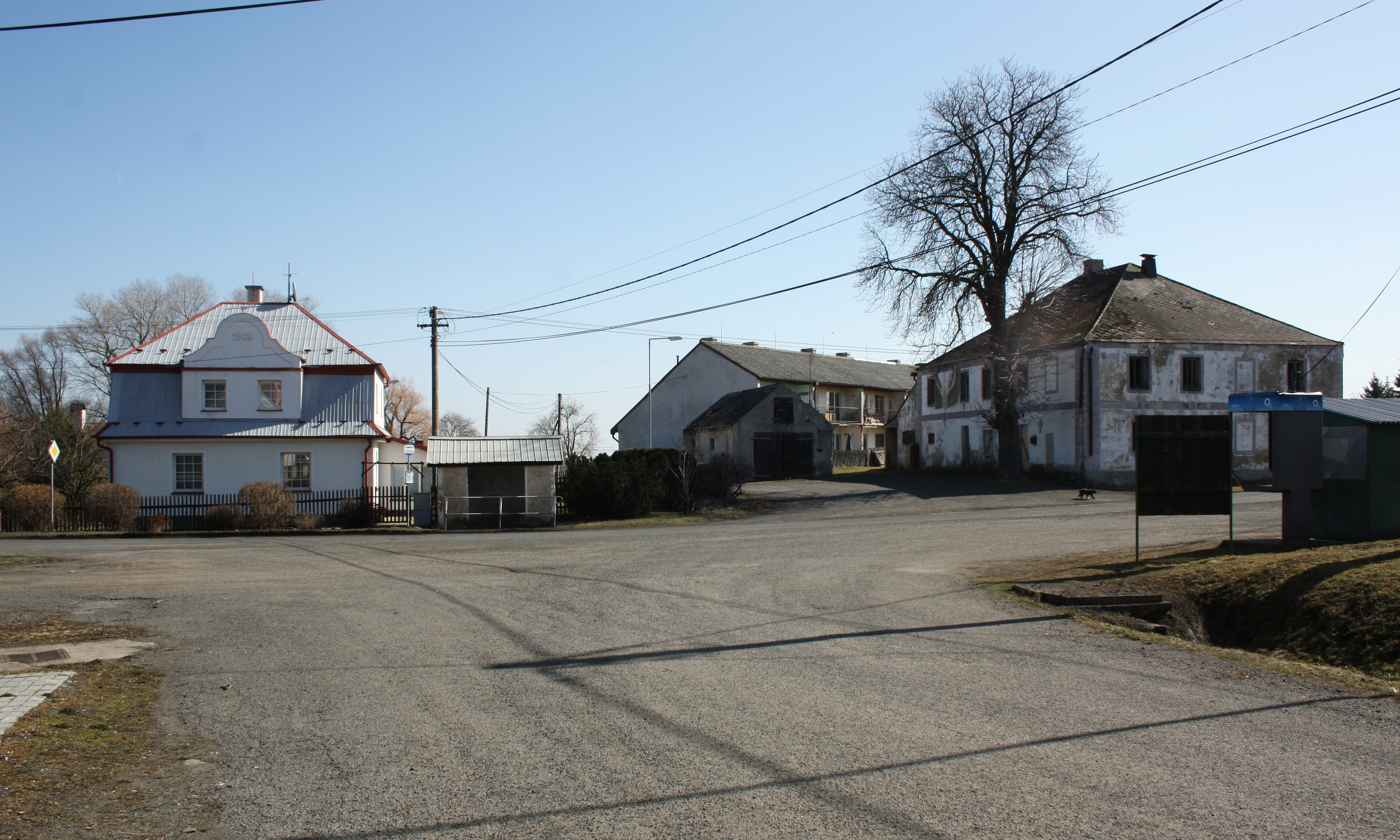
- Centre of Vrbice

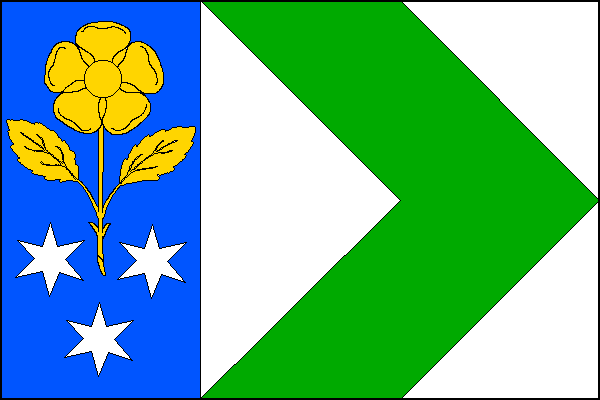
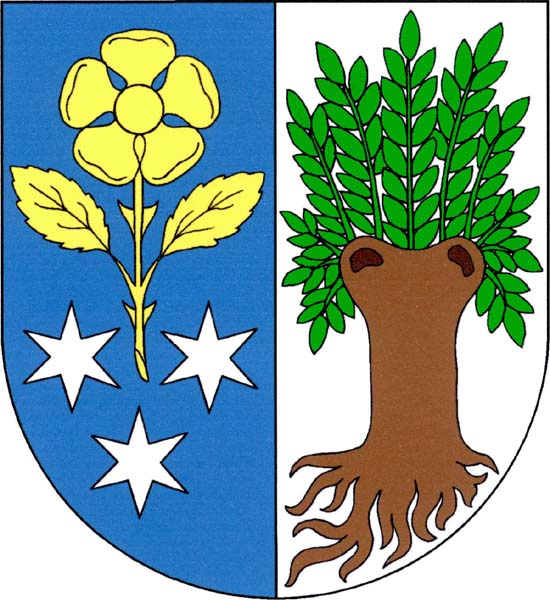
- Flag Coat of arms

- Location in the Czech Republic
- Coordinates: 50°8′59″N 13°14′2″E
- Country: Czech Republic
- Region: Karlovy Vary
- District: Karlovy Vary
- First mentioned: 1384

Area
  - Total: 7.66 km^{2} (2.96 sq mi)
- Elevation: 563 m (1,847 ft)

Population (2026-01-01)
  - Total: 202
  - Density: 26.4/km^{2} (68.3/sq mi)
- Time zone: UTC+1 (CET)
  - Summer (DST): UTC+2 (CEST)
- Postal code: 364 53
- Website: www.obec-vrbice.cz

Vrbice (German: Großfürwitz) is a municipality and village in Karlovy Vary District in the Karlovy Vary Region of the Czech Republic. It has about 200 inhabitants.

== Administrative division ==
Vrbice consists of three municipal parts (in brackets population according to the 2021 census):

- Vrbice (130)
- Bošov (40)
- Skřipová (9)

== Demographics ==
Historical population
Year	Pop.	±%
1869	455	—
1880	551	+21.1%
1890	580	+5.3%
1900	505	−12.9%
1910	473	−6.3%
1921	480	+1.5%
1930	507	+5.6%
1950	198	−60.9%
1961	160	−19.2%
1970	241	+50.6%
1980	210	−12.9%
1991	191	−9.0%
2001	170	−11.0%
2011	172	+1.2%
2021	179	+4.1%
Source: Censuses
