= Vojkovice (Karlovy Vary District) =

- Municipality
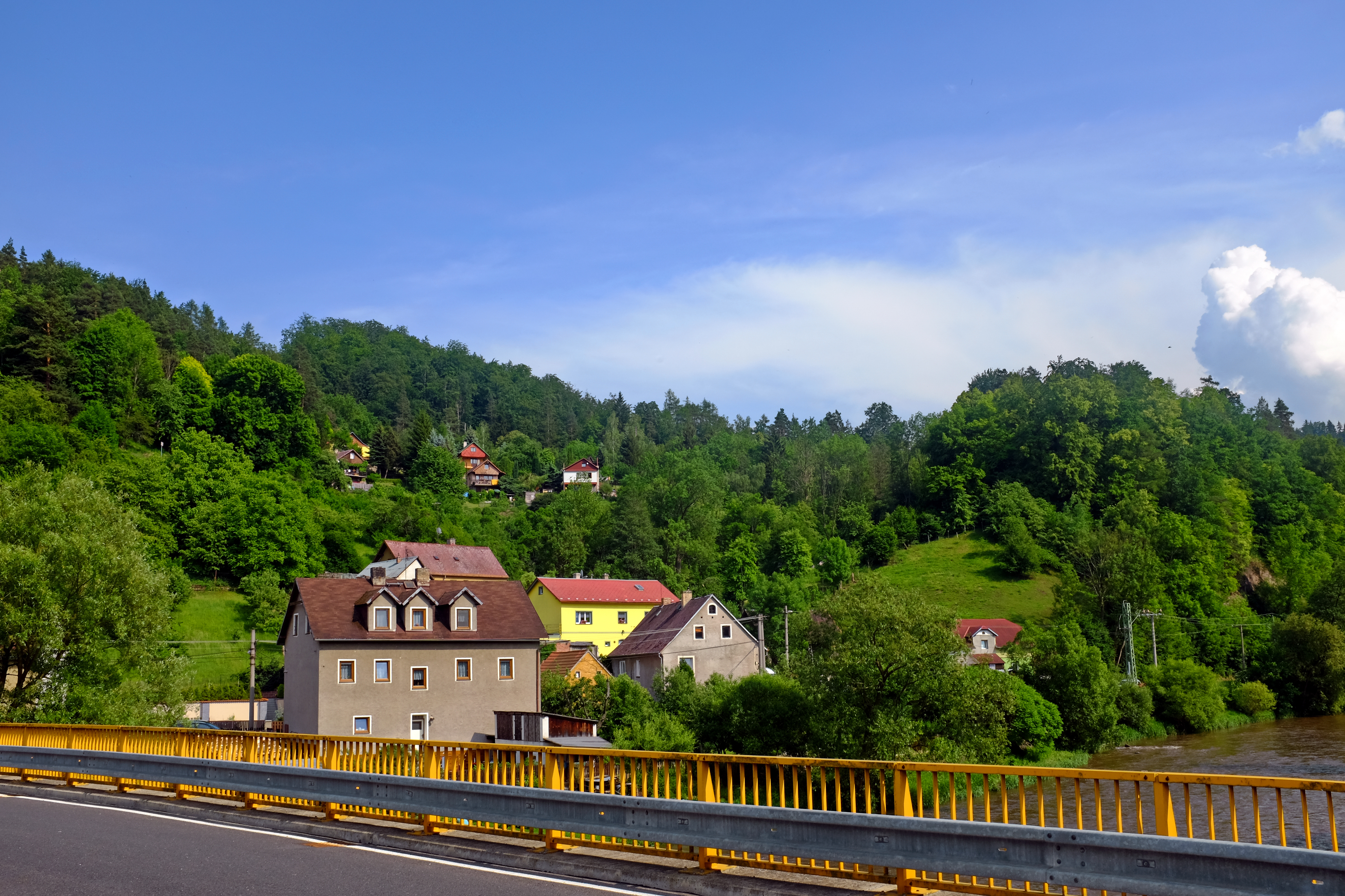
- View of Vojkovice

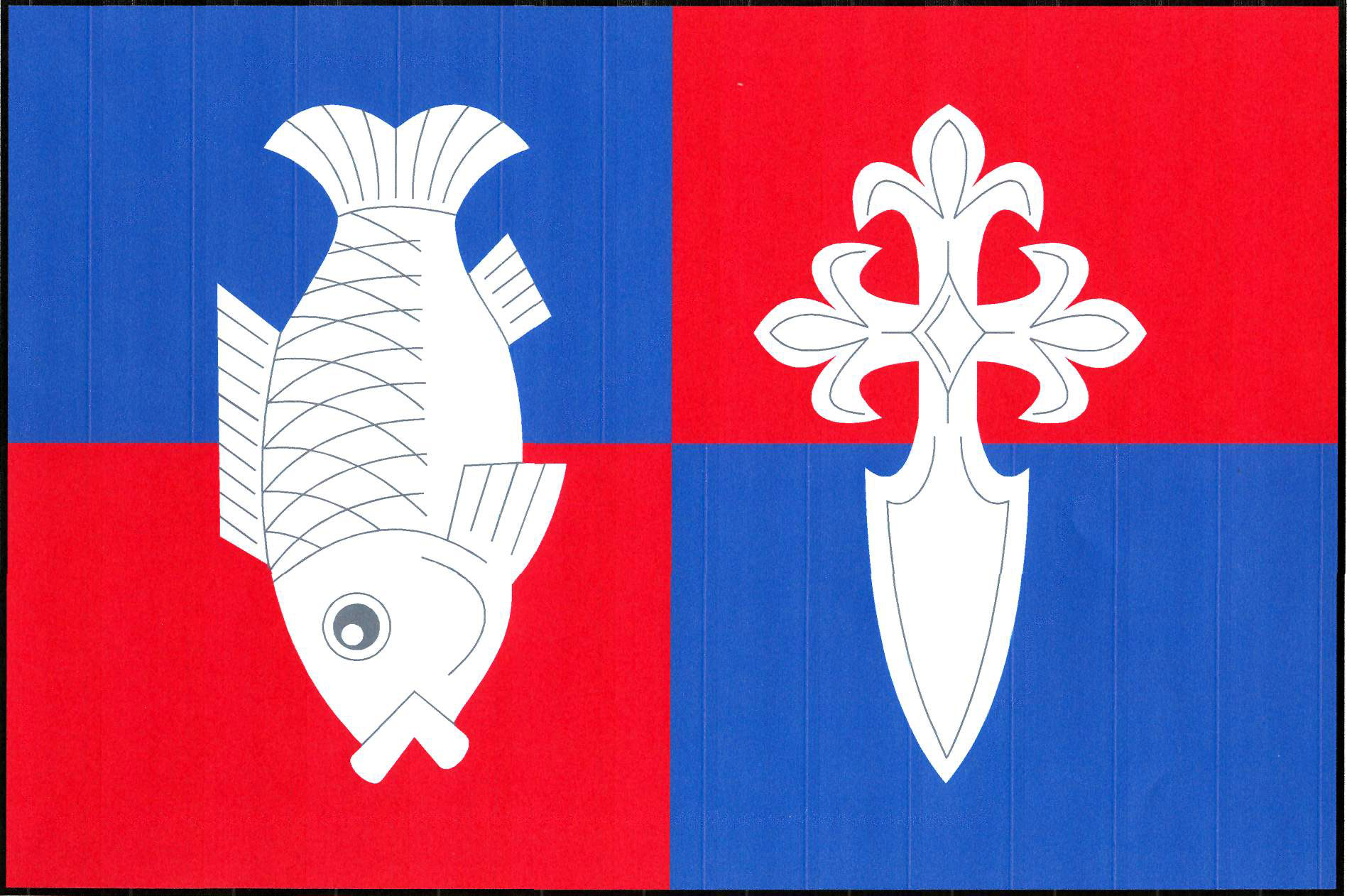
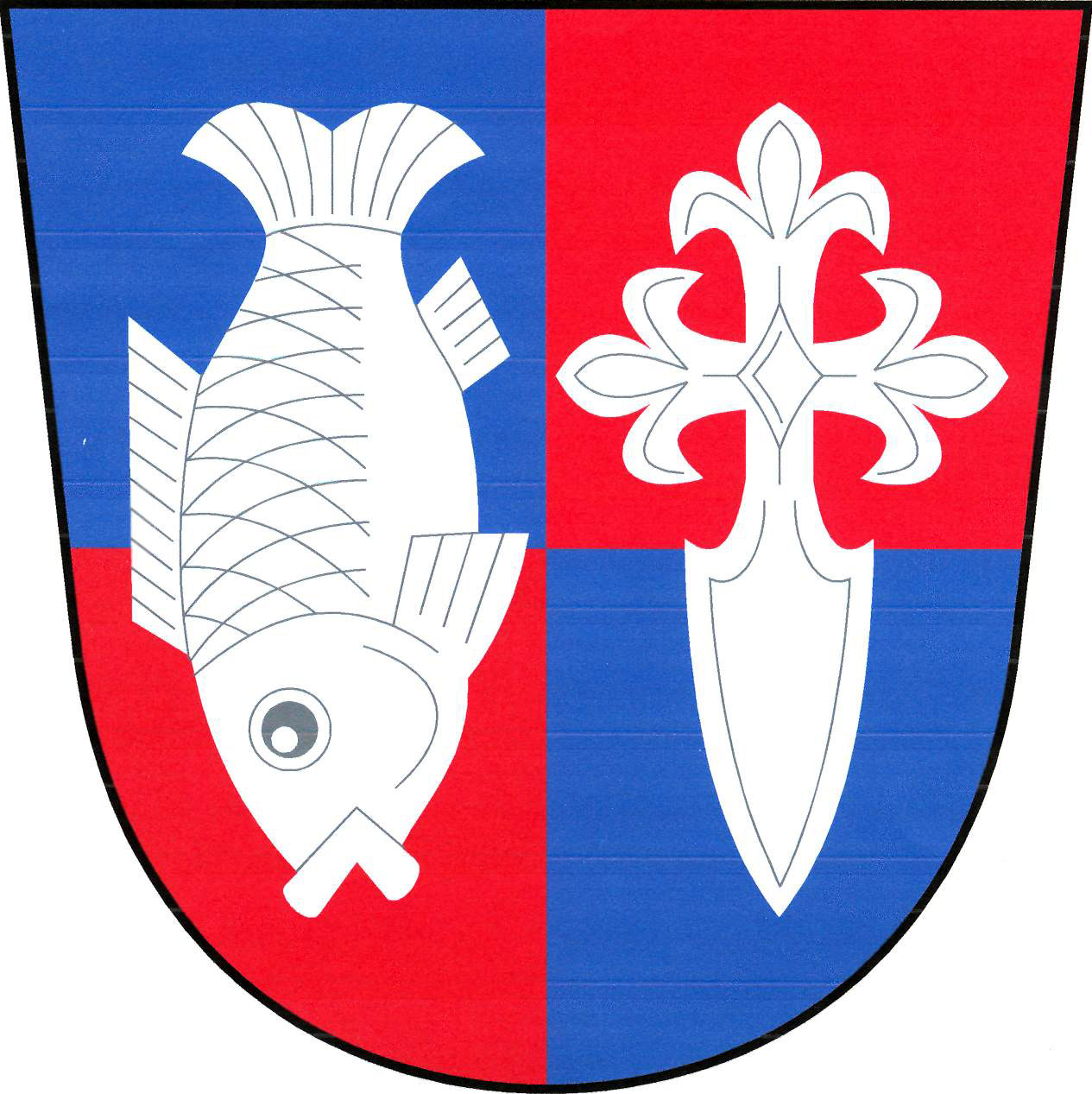
- Flag Coat of arms

- Location in the Czech Republic
- Coordinates: 50°18′12″N 13°0′59″E
- Country: Czech Republic
- Region: Karlovy Vary
- District: Karlovy Vary
- First mentioned: 1088

Area
  - Total: 7.03 km^{2} (2.71 sq mi)
- Elevation: 336 m (1,102 ft)

Population (2026-01-01)
  - Total: 640
  - Density: 91/km^{2} (240/sq mi)
- Time zone: UTC+1 (CET)
  - Summer (DST): UTC+2 (CEST)
- Postal codes: 362 73, 363 01
- Website: www.vojkovice-nad-ohri.cz

Vojkovice (German: Wickwitz) is a municipality and village in Karlovy Vary District in the Karlovy Vary Region of the Czech Republic. It has about 600 inhabitants.

== Administrative division ==
Vojkovice consists of two municipal parts (in brackets population according to the 2021 census):

- Vojkovice (362)
- Jakubov (220)

== Etymology ==
The name Vojkovice is derived from the personal name Vojek, meaning "the village of Vojek's people".

== History ==
The first written mention of Vojkovice is from 1088, when the village was called Vikvice. Jakubov was first mentioned in 1144, when both villages became property of the newly established monastery in Doksany.

== Demographics ==
Historical population
Year	Pop.	±%
1869	775	—
1880	819	+5.7%
1890	927	+13.2%
1900	1,290	+39.2%
1910	1,355	+5.0%
1921	1,361	+0.4%
1930	1,524	+12.0%
1950	1,013	−33.5%
1961	901	−11.1%
1970	861	−4.4%
1980	730	−15.2%
1991	538	−26.3%
2001	567	+5.4%
2011	626	+10.4%
2021	582	−7.0%
Source: Censuses
