= Doupovské Hradiště =

- Municipality
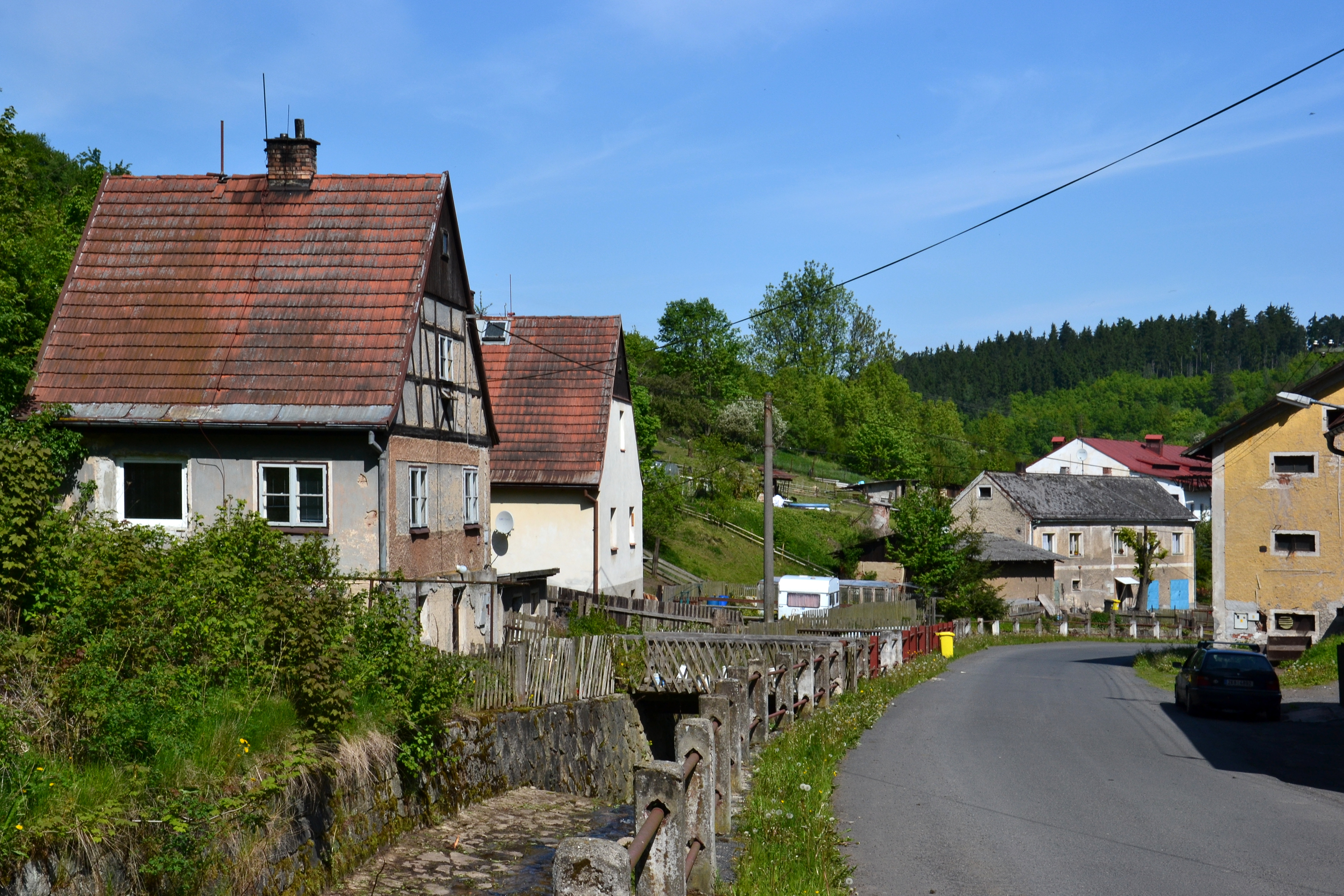
- Lučiny, a part of Doupovské Hradiště

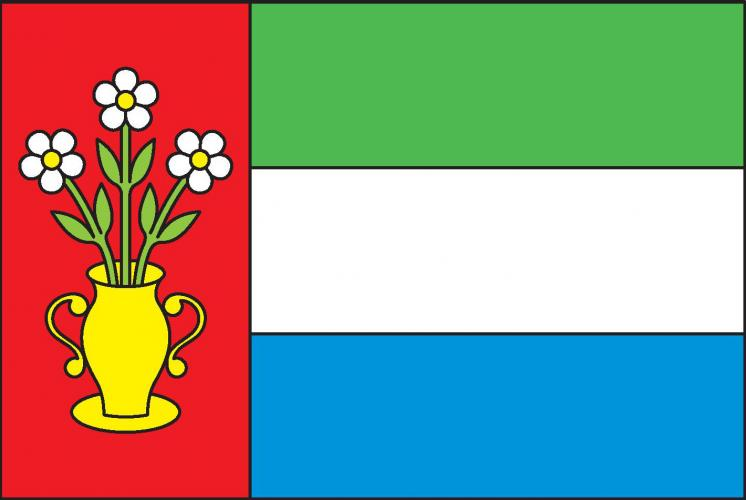
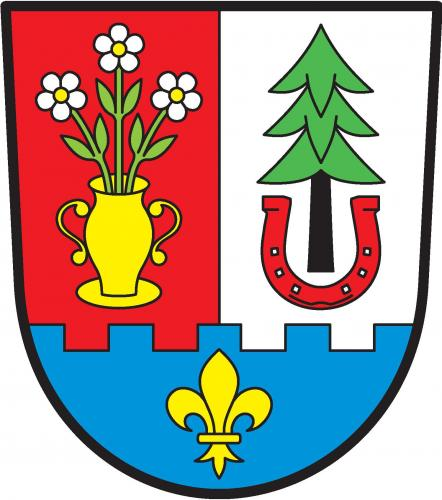
- Flag Coat of arms

- Location in the Czech Republic
- Coordinates: 50°13′53″N 13°0′49″E
- Country: Czech Republic
- Region: Karlovy Vary
- District: Karlovy Vary
- Established: 2016

Area
  - Total: 20.90 km^{2} (8.07 sq mi)
- Elevation: 485 m (1,591 ft)

Population (2026-01-01)
  - Total: 172
  - Density: 8.23/km^{2} (21.3/sq mi)
- Time zone: UTC+1 (CET)
  - Summer (DST): UTC+2 (CEST)
- Postal codes: 362 72, 364 71
- Website: www.doupovskehradiste.cz

Doupovské Hradiště is a municipality in Karlovy Vary District in the Karlovy Vary Region of the Czech Republic. It has about 200 inhabitants.

== Administrative division ==
Doupovské Hradiště consists of four municipal parts (in brackets population according to the 2021 census):

- Činov (0)
- Dolní Lomnice (60)
- Lučiny (67)
- Svatobor (20)

== History ==
The municipality was created on 1 January 2016 by diminishing of Military Area Hradiště.

== Demographics ==
Historical population
Year	Pop.	±%
1869	1,636	—
1880	1,854	+13.3%
1890	1,919	+3.5%
1900	2,105	+9.7%
1910	2,217	+5.3%
1921	1,922	−13.3%
1930	1,905	−0.9%
1950	374	−80.4%
1961	0	−100.0%
1970	0	0.00%
1980	0	0.00%
1991	0	0.00%
2001	168	—
2011	157	−6.5%
2021	147	−6.4%
Source: Censuses
