= Otročín =

- Municipality
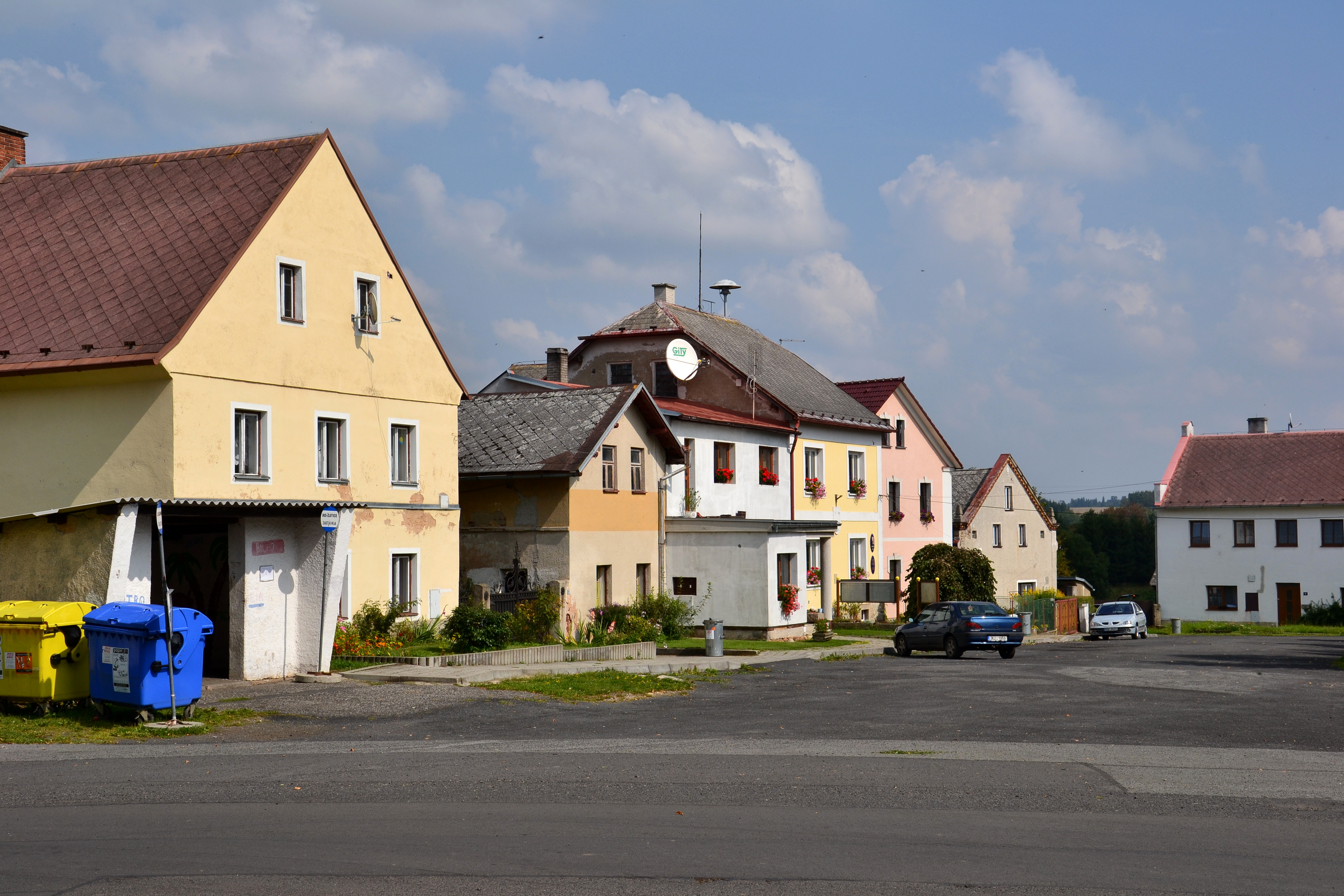
- Centre of Otročín

- Flag Coat of arms

- Location in the Czech Republic
- Coordinates: 50°1′57″N 12°53′33″E
- Country: Czech Republic
- Region: Karlovy Vary
- District: Karlovy Vary
- First mentioned: 1233

Area
  - Total: 35.80 km^{2} (13.82 sq mi)
- Elevation: 632 m (2,073 ft)

Population (2026-01-01)
  - Total: 438
  - Density: 12.2/km^{2} (31.7/sq mi)
- Time zone: UTC+1 (CET)
  - Summer (DST): UTC+2 (CEST)
- Postal code: 364 01
- Website: www.otrocin.eu

Otročín (German: Landek) is a municipality and village in Karlovy Vary District in the Karlovy Vary Region of the Czech Republic. It has about 400 inhabitants.

== Administrative division ==
Otročín consists of five municipal parts (in brackets population according to the 2021 census):

- Otročín (215)
- Brť (80)
- Měchov (45)
- Poseč (30)
- Tisová (20)

== Demographics ==
Historical population
Year	Pop.	±%
1869	2,025	—
1880	2,075	+2.5%
1890	2,147	+3.5%
1900	2,205	+2.7%
1910	2,119	−3.9%
1921	2,017	−4.8%
1930	1,970	−2.3%
1950	880	−55.3%
1961	770	−12.5%
1970	665	−13.6%
1980	590	−11.3%
1991	567	−3.9%
2001	538	−5.1%
2011	474	−11.9%
2021	390	−17.7%
Source: Censuses
