= Vysoká Pec (Karlovy Vary District) =

- Municipality
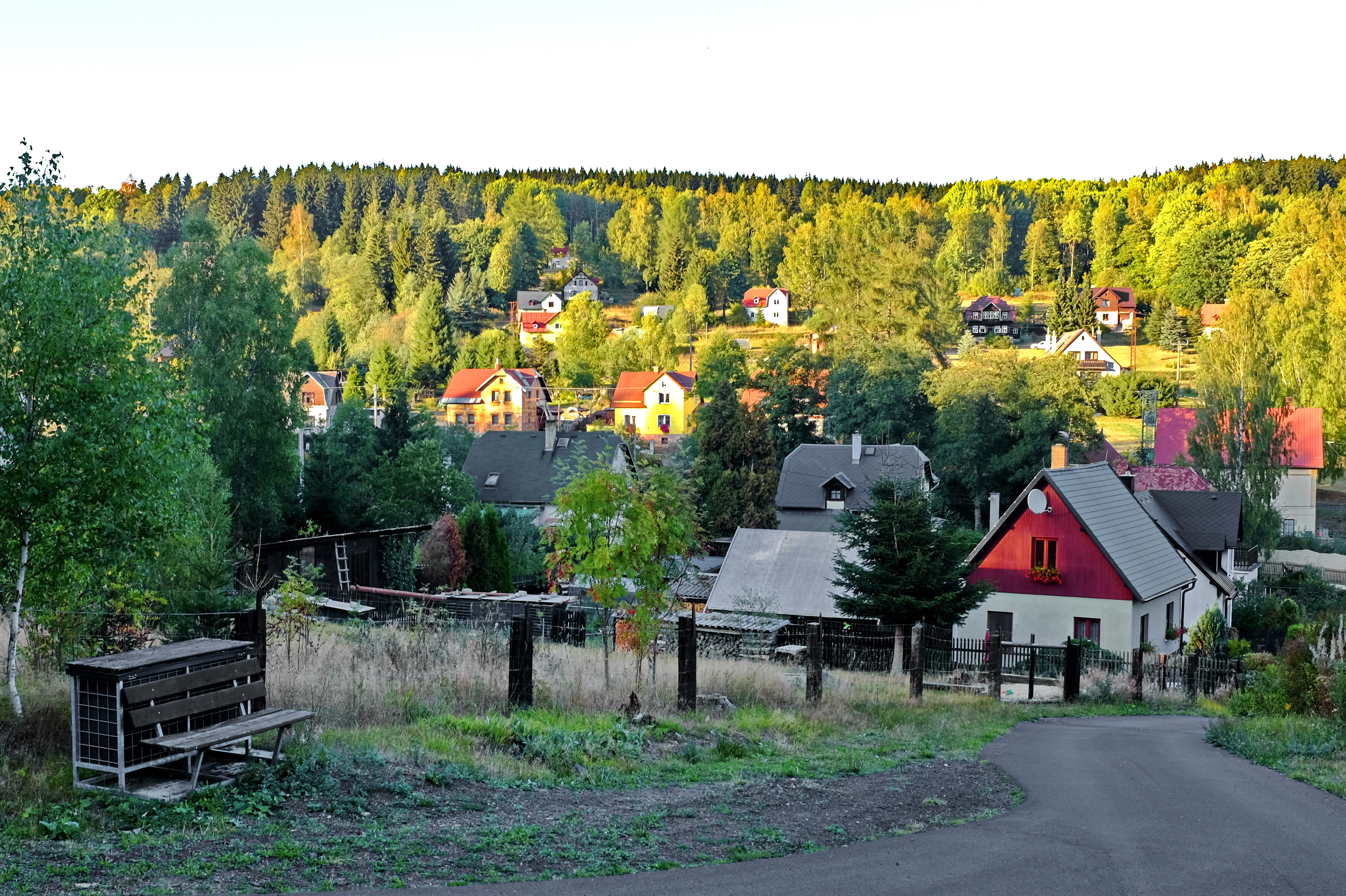
- General view

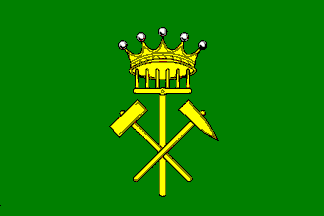
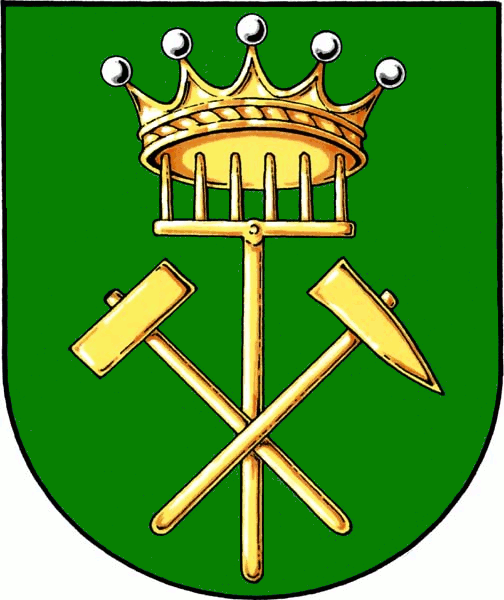
- Flag Coat of arms

- Location in the Czech Republic
- Coordinates: 50°20′48″N 12°41′57″E
- Country: Czech Republic
- Region: Karlovy Vary
- District: Karlovy Vary
- First mentioned: 1590

Area
  - Total: 13.36 km^{2} (5.16 sq mi)
- Elevation: 744 m (2,441 ft)

Population (2026-01-01)
  - Total: 340
  - Density: 25/km^{2} (66/sq mi)
- Time zone: UTC+1 (CET)
  - Summer (DST): UTC+2 (CEST)
- Postal code: 362 21
- Website: www.vysokapec.eu

Vysoká Pec is a municipality and village in Karlovy Vary District in the Karlovy Vary Region of the Czech Republic. It has about 300 inhabitants.

== Administrative division ==
Vysoká Pec consists of two municipal parts (in brackets population according to the 2021 census):

- Vysoká Pec (126)
- Rudné (221)

== Demographics ==
Historical population
Year	Pop.	±%
1869	2,309	—
1880	2,285	−1.0%
1890	2,265	−0.9%
1900	2,252	−0.6%
1910	2,344	+4.1%
1921	2,137	−8.8%
1930	2,186	+2.3%
1950	343	−84.3%
1961	339	−1.2%
1970	307	−9.4%
1980	258	−16.0%
1991	227	−12.0%
2001	258	+13.7%
2011	329	+27.5%
2021	347	+5.5%
Source: Censuses
