= Stanovice (Karlovy Vary District) =

- Municipality
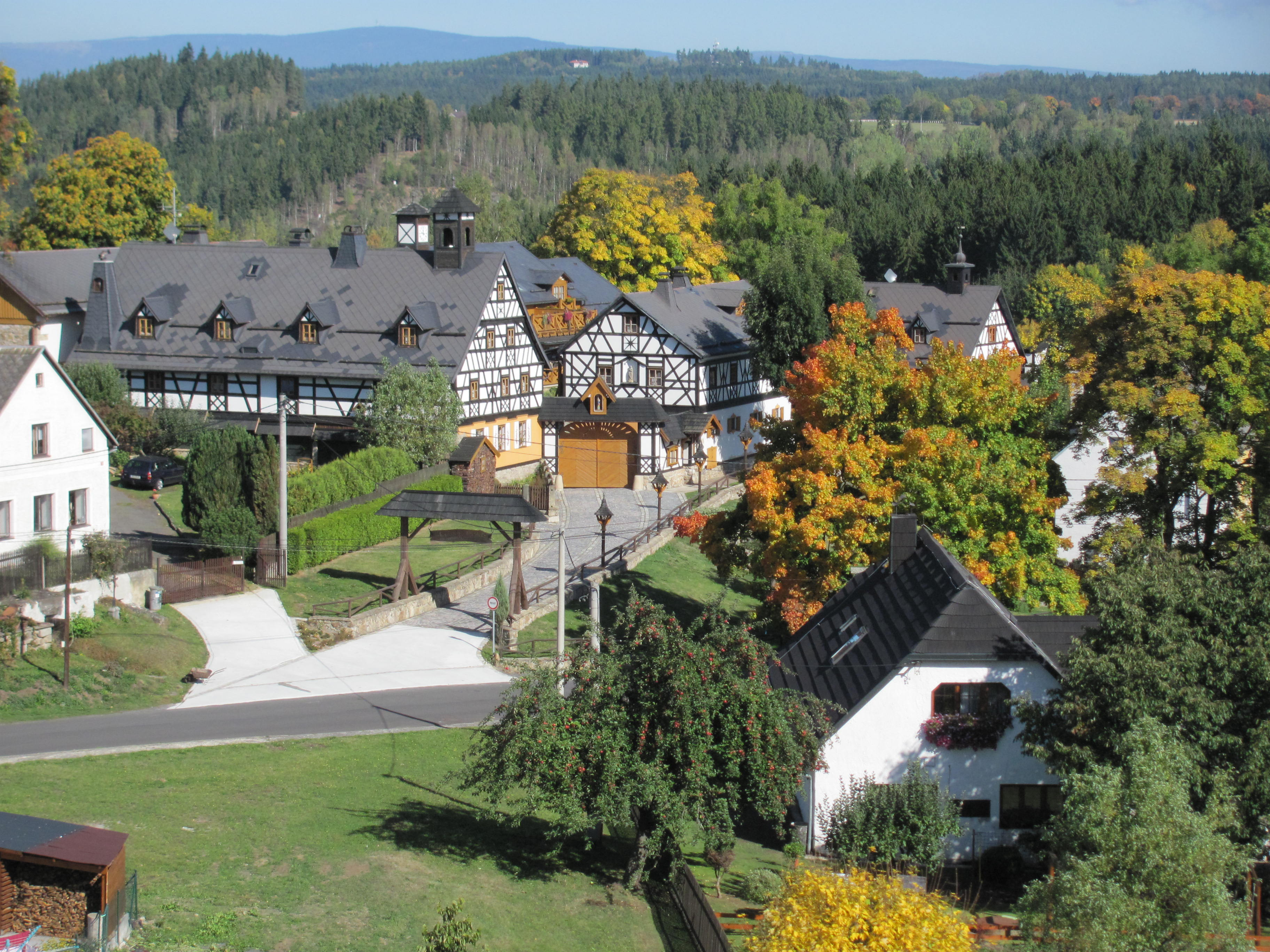
- Timber-framed farm estate

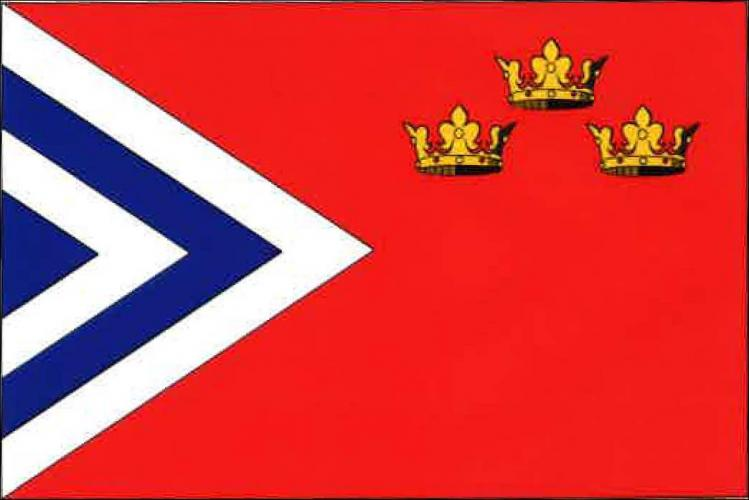
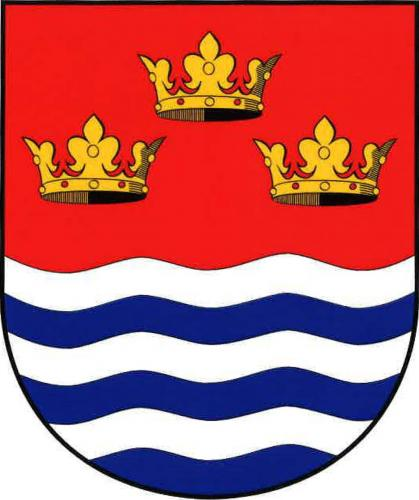
- Flag Coat of arms

- Location in the Czech Republic
- Coordinates: 50°9′55″N 12°52′26″E
- Country: Czech Republic
- Region: Karlovy Vary
- District: Karlovy Vary
- First mentioned: 1358

Area
  - Total: 31.61 km^{2} (12.20 sq mi)
- Elevation: 558 m (1,831 ft)

Population (2026-01-01)
  - Total: 652
  - Density: 20.6/km^{2} (53.4/sq mi)
- Time zone: UTC+1 (CET)
  - Summer (DST): UTC+2 (CEST)
- Postal code: 360 01
- Website: www.obecstanovice.cz

Stanovice (German: Donawitz) is a municipality and village in Karlovy Vary District in the Karlovy Vary Region of the Czech Republic. It has about 700 inhabitants.

== Administrative division ==
Stanovice consists of four municipal parts (in brackets population according to the 2021 census):

- Stanovice (306)
- Dražov (122)
- Hlinky (108)
- Nové Stanovice (35)

== Demographics ==
Historical population
Year	Pop.	±%
1869	2,603	—
1880	2,733	+5.0%
1890	2,682	−1.9%
1900	2,745	+2.3%
1910	2,581	−6.0%
1921	2,358	−8.6%
1930	2,368	+0.4%
1950	698	−70.5%
1961	670	−4.0%
1970	616	−8.1%
1980	543	−11.9%
1991	457	−15.8%
2001	489	+7.0%
2011	564	+15.3%
2021	571	+1.2%
Source: Censuses
