= Veronika Psotková =

Czech sculptor

acad. sculptor Veronika Psotková
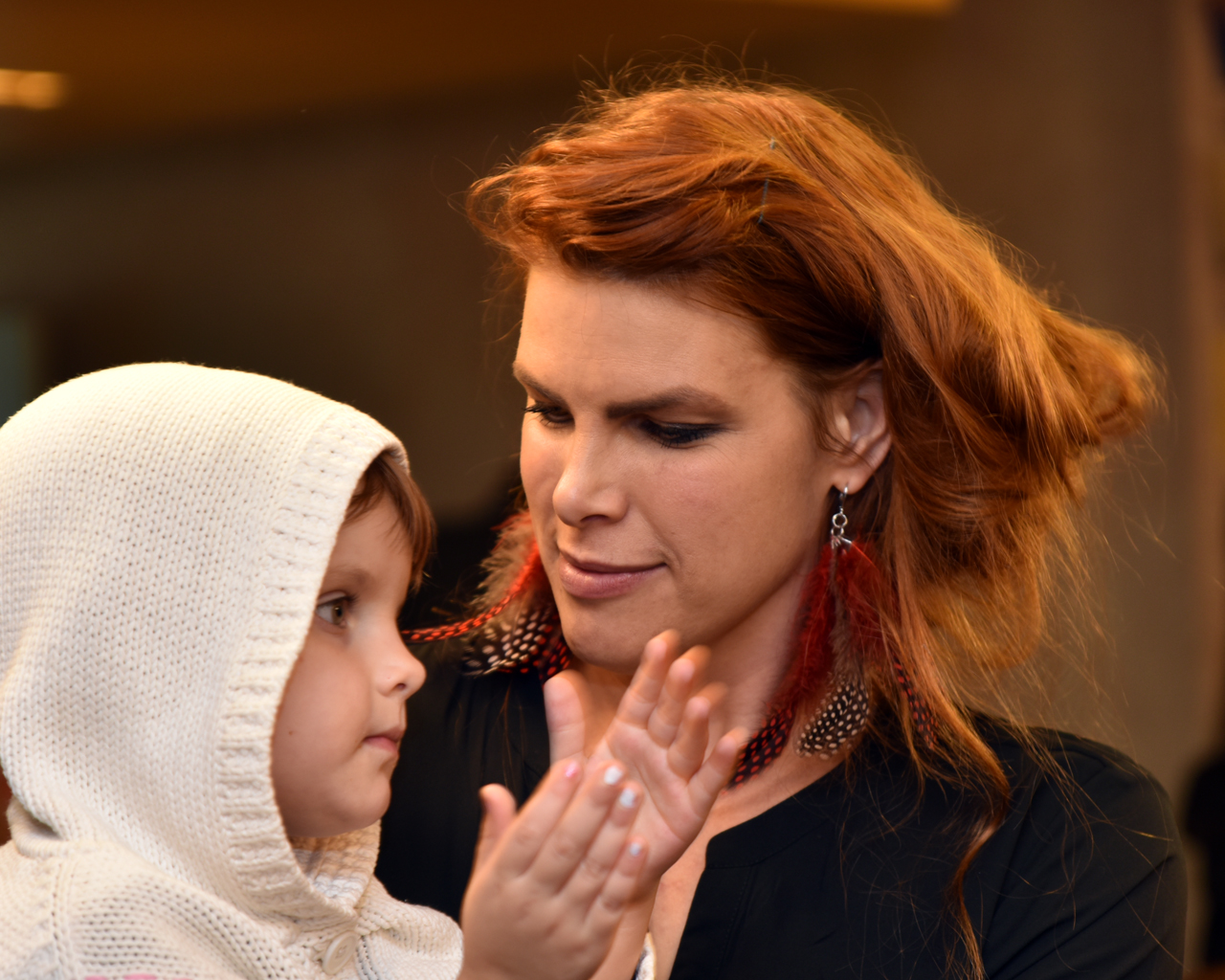
- Psotková in 2019
- Born: 17 October 1981 (age 44); Opava, Czechoslovakia
- Education: Palacký University Olomouc, Brno University of Technology
- Known for: sculptor
- Awards: Publikumspreis Nordart 2021; BIG SEE Architecture Award 2024
- Website: veronikapsotkova.net

Veronika Kudláčková Psotková (born 17 October 1981) is Czech sculptor and creator of monumental spatial installations.

== Life ==
Veronika Psotková was born on 17 October 1981 in Opava. She graduated from Mendel High School in Opava in 2001 and attended a public art school. From 2001 to 2006, she studied art teaching and mathematics for secondary education at the Faculty of Education, Palacký University Olomouc. During her final year, she also studied sculpture at Faculty of Fine Arts, Brno University of Technology in the sculpture studio of Michal Gabriel. While still a student, she held her first solo exhibition in 2006 and also participated in group exhibitions. Her 2009 thesis project, Grandfather's Garden — a series of 28 figures, won the Dean's Award and was exhibited at the DOX Gallery in Prague.

She has been actively practicing sports since her youth, focusing on swimming and playing basketball, volleyball, and beach volleyball, and this experience has also influenced the themes of her sculptures. Since completing her college studies, she has been a free-lance sculptor.

In 2021, the renovation of St. Joseph's Chapel in Slavětín, designed by the Tsunami architectural studio and featuring an altar designed by Psotková, received an honorable mention in the “2021 Building of the Year in the Hradec Králové Region” competition. In 2024, her design for the Slavětín church won the category for public, cultural, and infrastructure buildings and received the BIG SEE Architecture Award in Slovenia. In 2021, she also received the Public Choice Award at the Nord Art International exhibition in Büdelsdorf (Schleswig-Holstein). In 2025 she prepared multifigured composition for the Church of Santa Maria della Visitazione in Venice.

Since 2010, she has lived with her husband and two daughters in Obora near Louny, where she has a studio.

=== Awards ===
- 2009 Dean's Award for Thesis, Faculty of Architecture and Design, Brno University of Technology
- 2021 Building of the Year 2021, Hradec Králové Region, “Honorable Mention”
- 2021 Publikumspreis 2021, Nordart 2021, Büdelsdorf, Germany
- 2024 BIG SEE Architecture Award 2024. Winner in the category of public, cultural, and infrastructure buildings, Slovenia – for the conversion of St. Joseph's Chapel in Slavětín

== Work ==
Since the beginning of her career, Psotková has focused primarily on figurative art and themes such as the aesthetics of the body and the boundaries of intimacy (Time I and II, 2021). Her work draws on classical sculpture influenced by contemporary pop culture. In her interpretation, so-called gender themes take on a playful or exaggerated quality and are characterized by a light touch of irony. An important theme for her is sports and free movement liberated from gravity, as seen in her "flying dreams". She reflects on situations she experiences, and as a young mother, she also explores the themes of motherhood, closeness to children, and creating a sense of security. Separately, she also exhibits sketches and digital graphics, which serve as visualizations of her sculptural installations. The works from 2016–2019 consist primarily of reflections on the life of a woman and mother, which served as the basis for her later sculptural installations Euphoria, Connection, In Space, and Mom's Coffee.

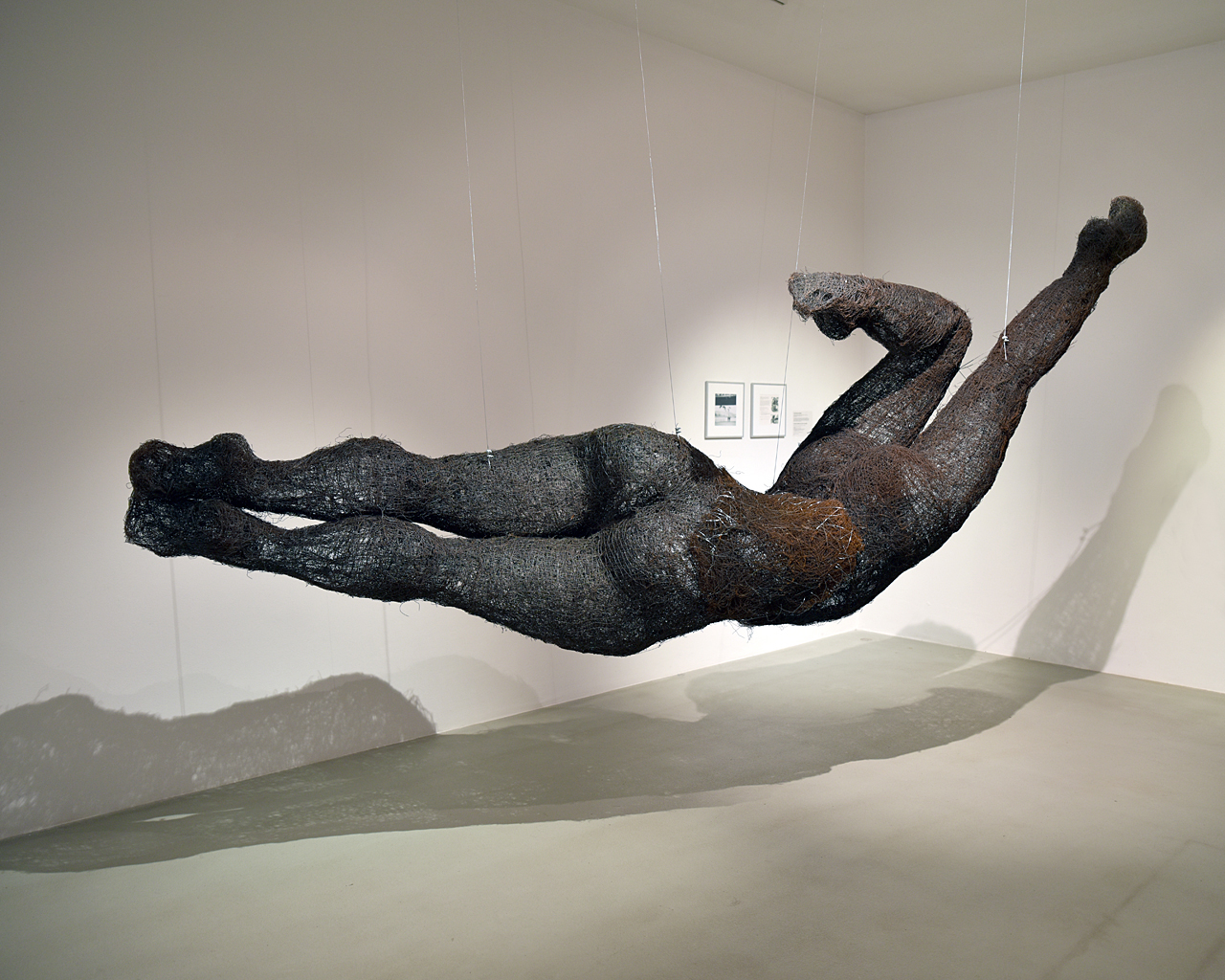
Interconnected (2016), DOX Prague 2019

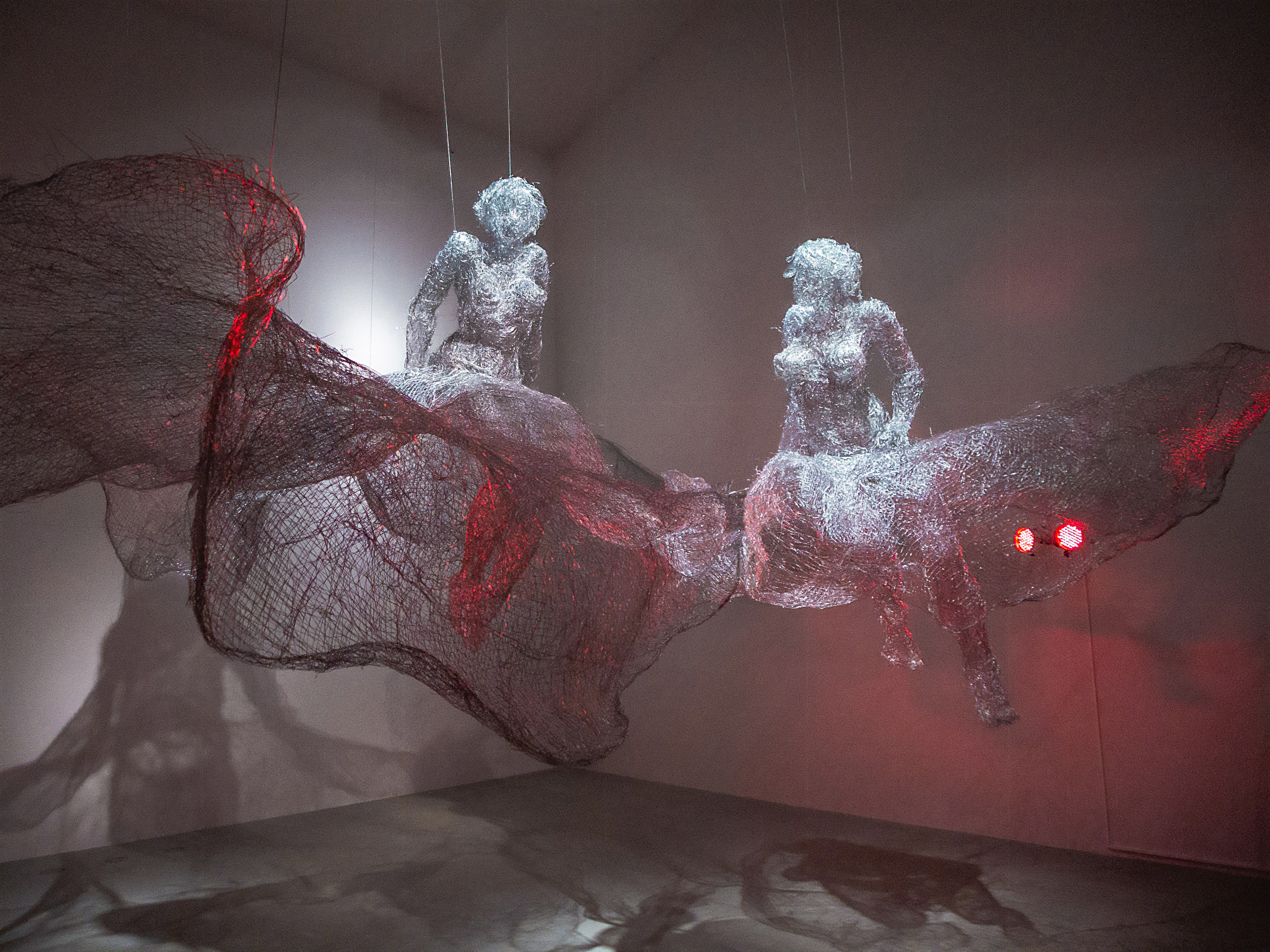
Together wih her, site specific, DOX Prague 2019

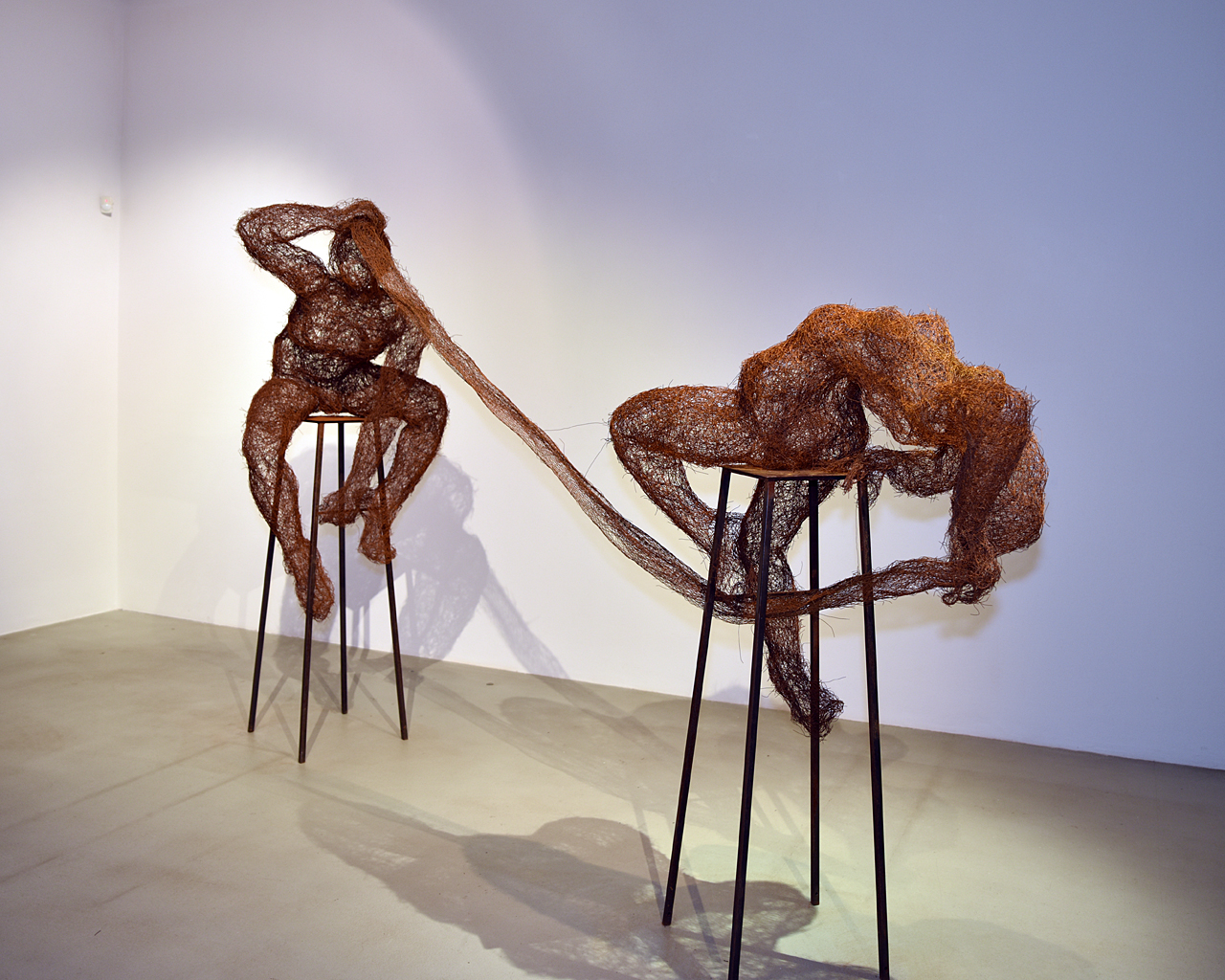
Ego and Ego, site specific, DOX Prague 2019

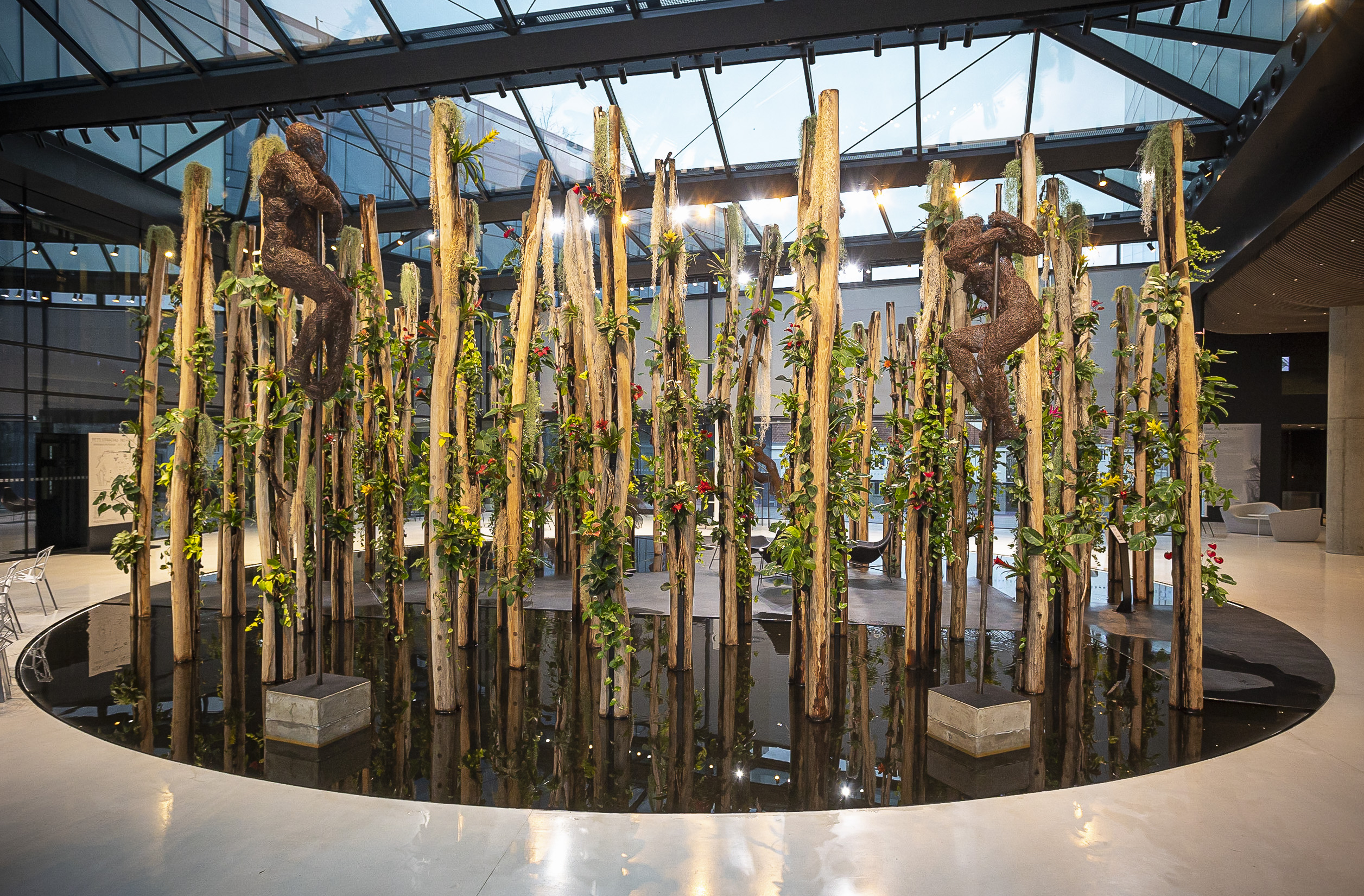
Better Perspective 2019, instalation Artium 2024, Prague

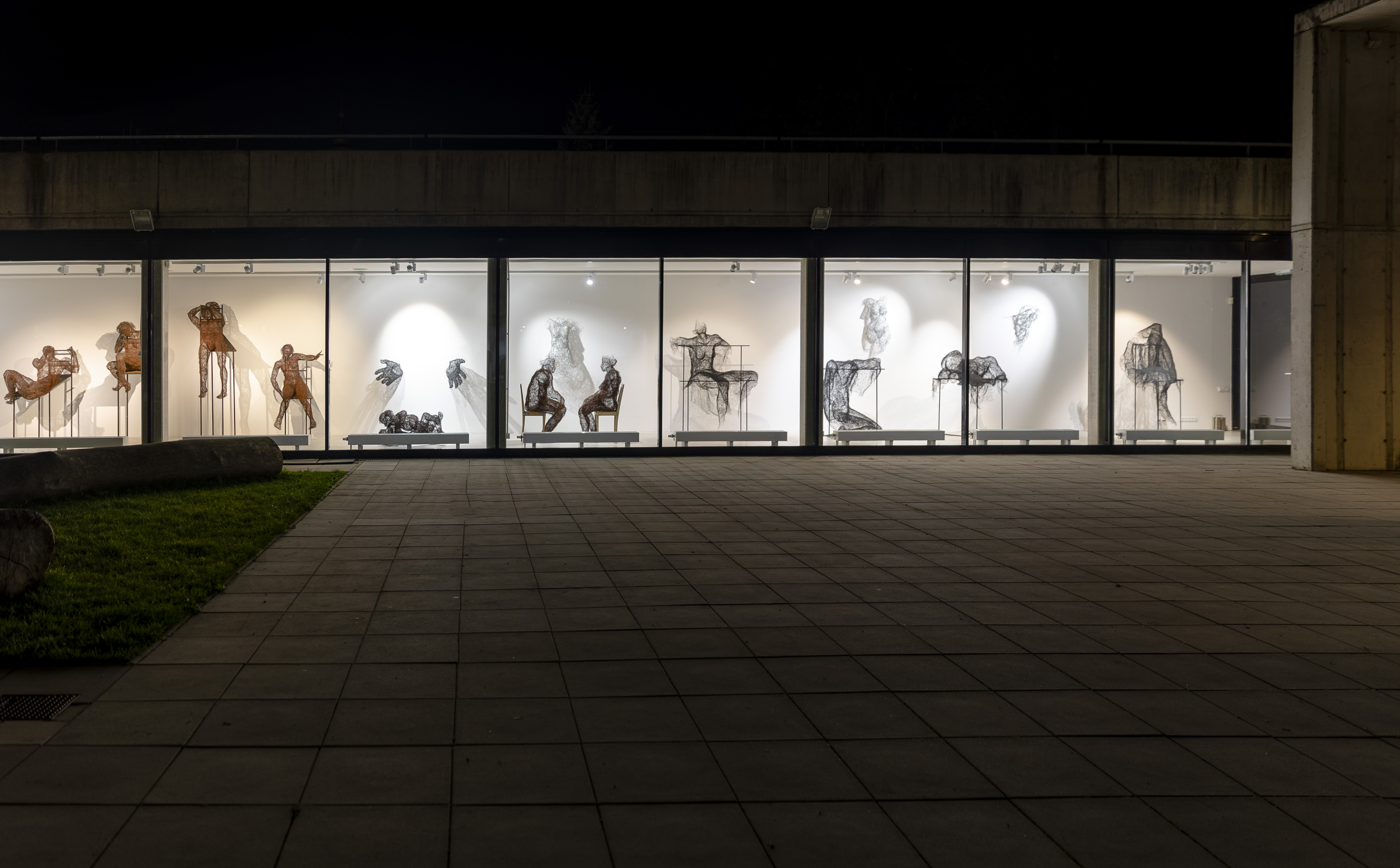
Lazy skin 2023, Desítky Gallery, Vratislavice nad Nisou

Her realistic sculptural work in plaster, artificial stone made of Roman cement, acrylic, and bronze, she devoted herself to mainly during her studies, is very time-consuming. In an effort to lighten the form and speed up the process, she chose wire mesh on a wire frame as her material in 2007. She later discovered that it is possible to shape sculptures from wire mesh without a supporting structure onto which to mold the sculpture; instead, she cuts, shapes, and sews the wire mesh directly into "shells" — three-dimensional "drawings". The framework, which she later removes, is needed only for larger objects.

She allows her sculptures made of wire mesh to develop a natural rust patina, or she repaints them and seals the finish with varnish. For outdoor sculptures, she also uses hot-dip galvanized wire mesh (Latte and Cheesecake, Kampa, Prague, 2023). While the final appearance of the outdoor sculptures is shaped by the weather and the gradual rusting of the material (Bikini Club, DOX, 2012), indoor installations offer the opportunity to work with the specific architecture of the space, to experiment, and to make creative use of colored lighting, which sometimes emphasizes the sculpture's volume or reveals it as a spatial drawing when viewed through. The lightness of the material allows her to create generously shaped, often larger-than-life figures that hang freely in space (17 figures of Aquabelles for the Forum Shopping Center in Liberec, 2016).

Psotková's sculptures are often created as site-specific to fit a specific location and frequently respond to existing architecture or the genius loci. At the same time, they reflect personal emotions and events, which she gives tangible form through her sculptures. As she comments: Through the gradual blending of themes and visual ideas and their refinement, I have created for myself a simple personal glossary, a concise guide for everyday life, for a complex world in which routine certainties have turned into shifting ground beneath my feet. For me, the sculptures become illustrations of this guide.

The Dive-in sculpture group was created during the COVID-19 pandemic, with figures floating in the space of a vault on the Prague waterfront, separated from passersby by glass. She was deeply affected by the Russian invasion of Ukraine, and working on the sculpture — her first politically engaged piece — helped her overcome her initial feelings of paralysis and helplessness. In 2022, she created a sculpture titled Vinok, which hangs above Dlouhá Street near the NoD Gallery in Prague. It depicts a young woman wearing a wreath (vinok) shaped like the rising sun. Vinok is a Ukrainian symbol of the worship of Mother Earth and has also come to represent glory, victory, happiness, success, peace, chastity, youth, and femininity. The author symbolically dedicated it to all mothers in the war in Ukraine.

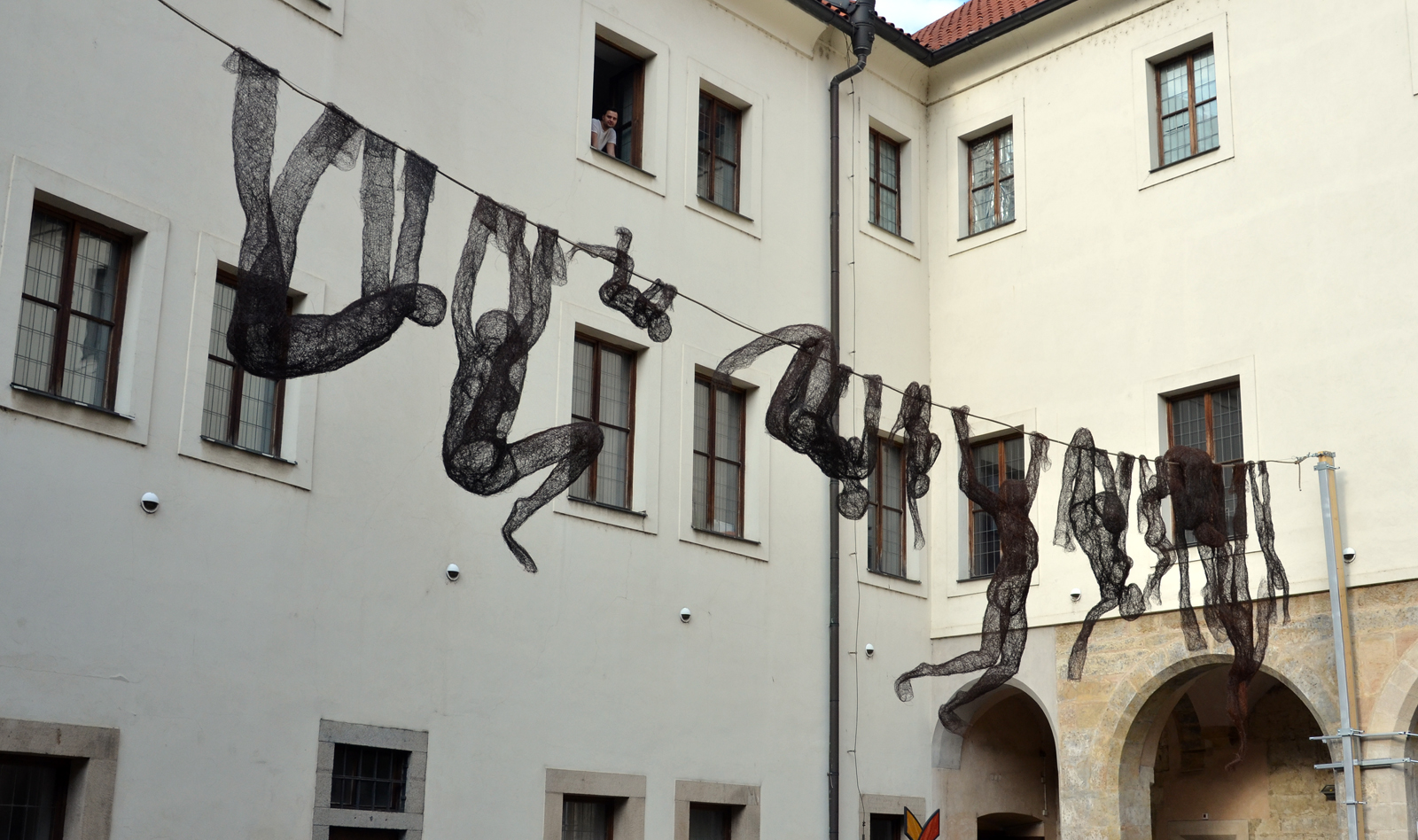
Big Laundry 2015, site-specific, New Town Hall, Prague

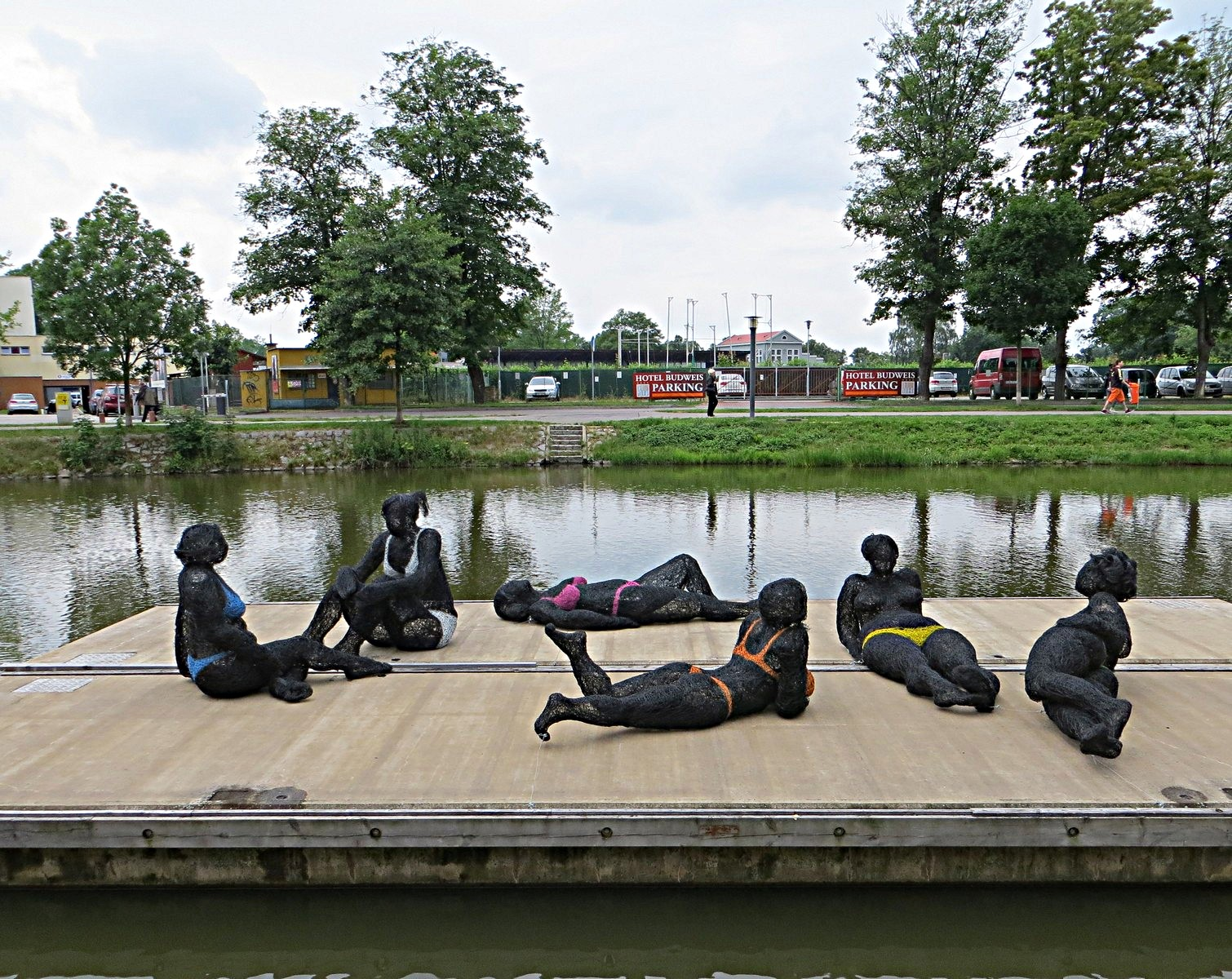
Bikini Club, 2015, Malše

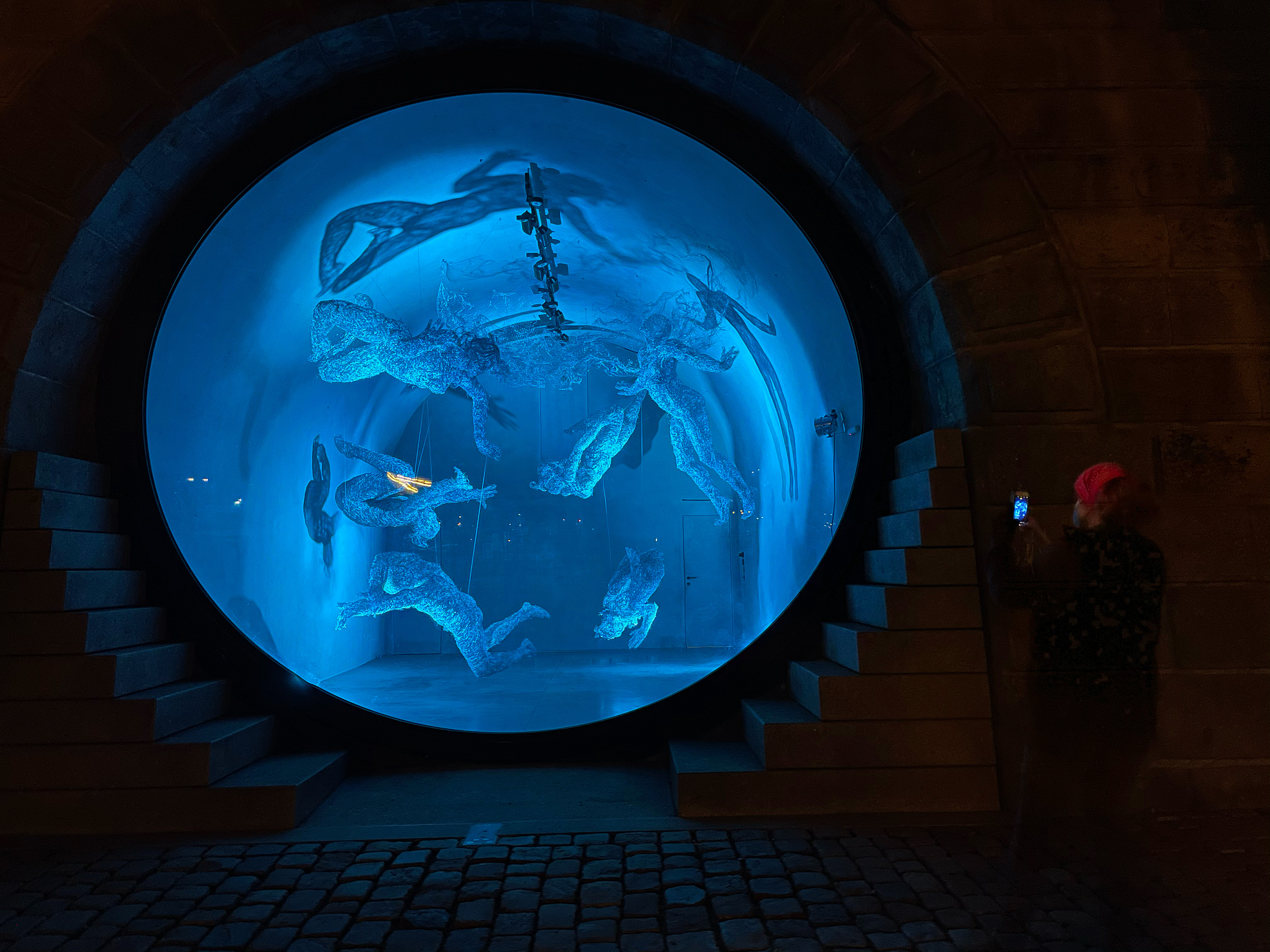
Dive-In 2021, site-specific, (A)void Gallery Prague

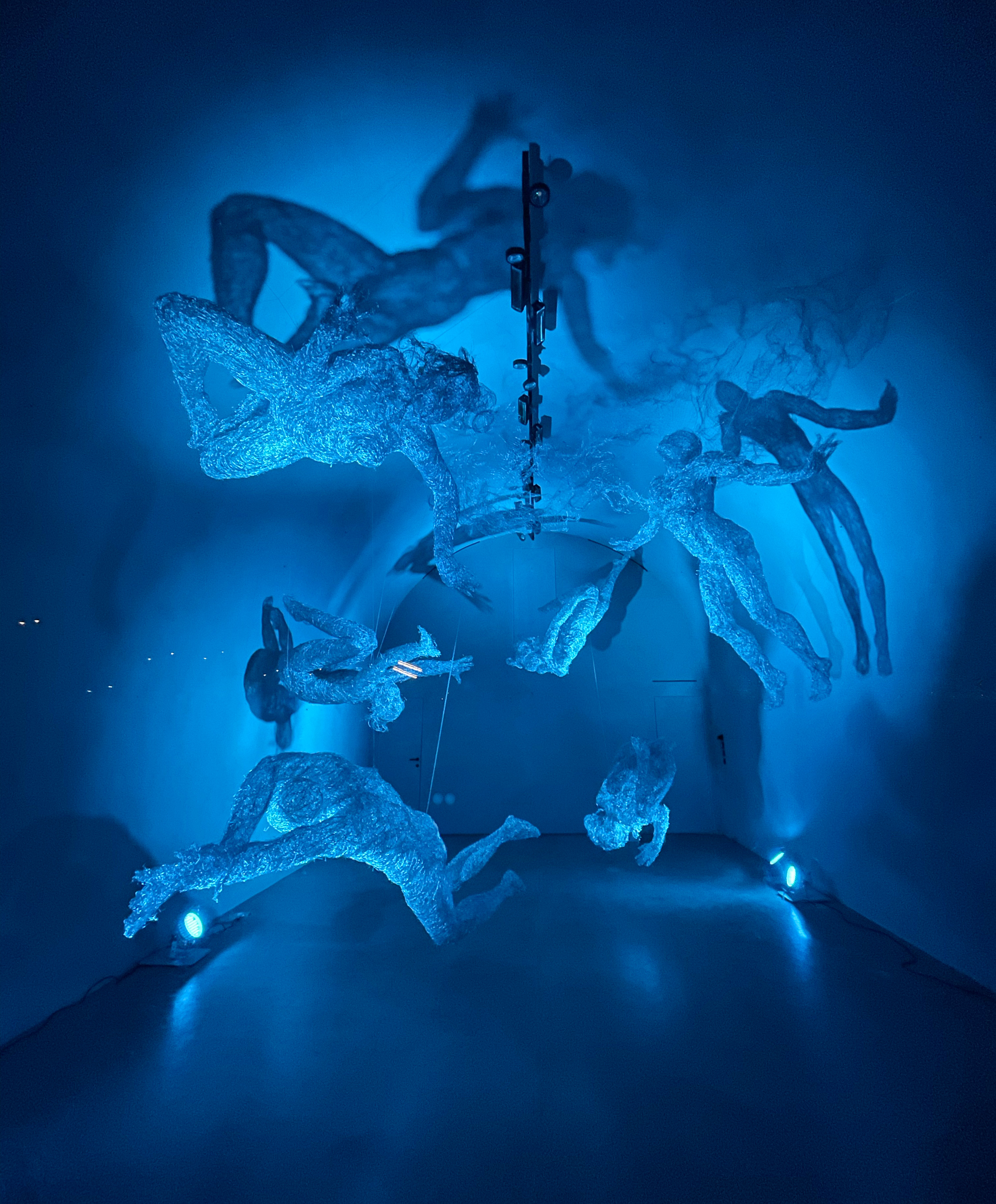
Dive-In 2021, site-specific,(A)void Gallery Prgue

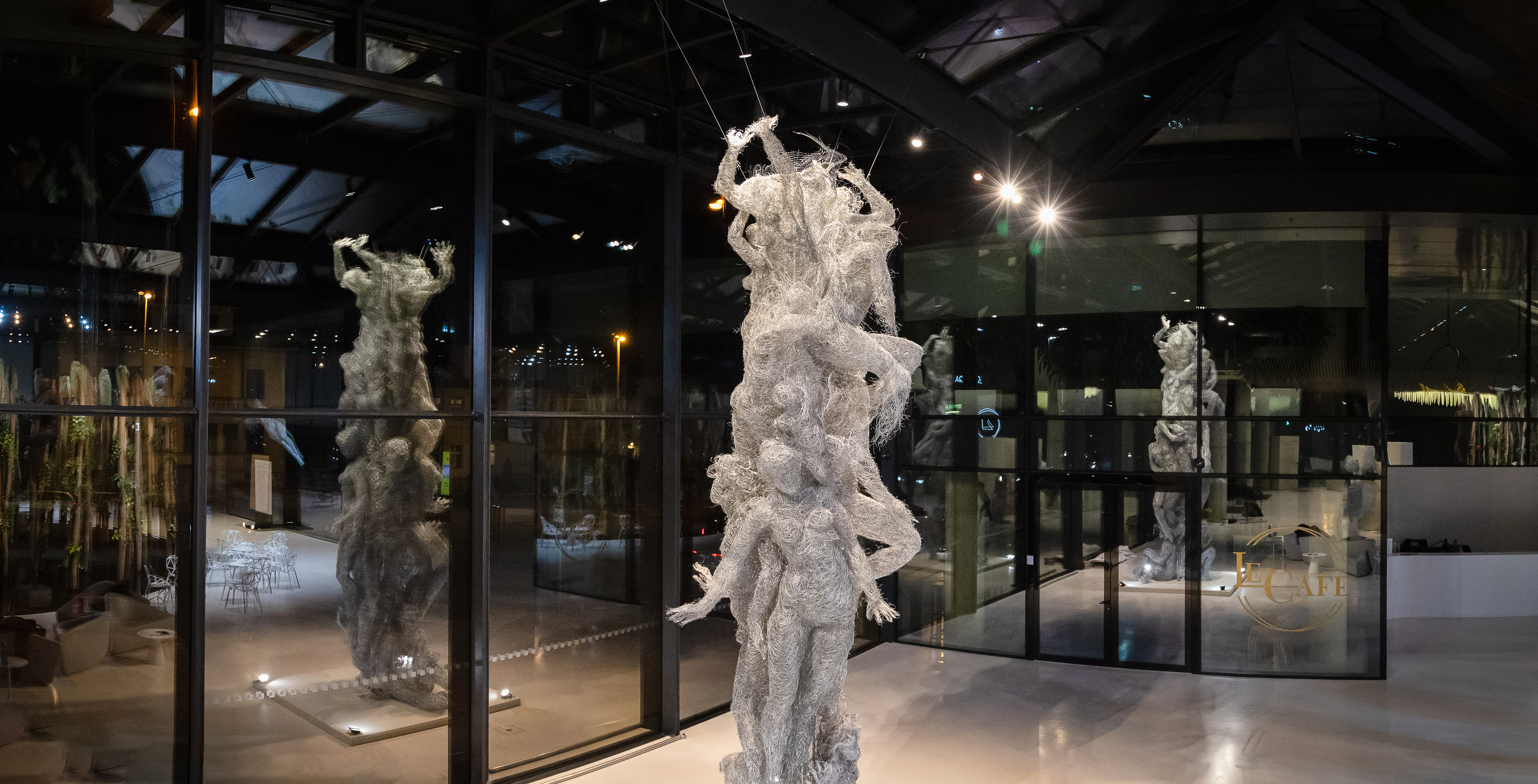
Pillar of Society 2024 site-specific Artium Prgue

Another work with a socially critical message is Pillar of Society (2024), a site-specific installation that calls for a sense of community in the face of individualism, loneliness, and indifference. It is accompanied by the sculptures Lazy Skin, which reflect a feeling of emptiness and merging with the surface, the inability to get up, burnout, and acceptance of one's own condition. Her other work - A Better Perspective, explores the search for perspective and outlook in a confusing space and context.

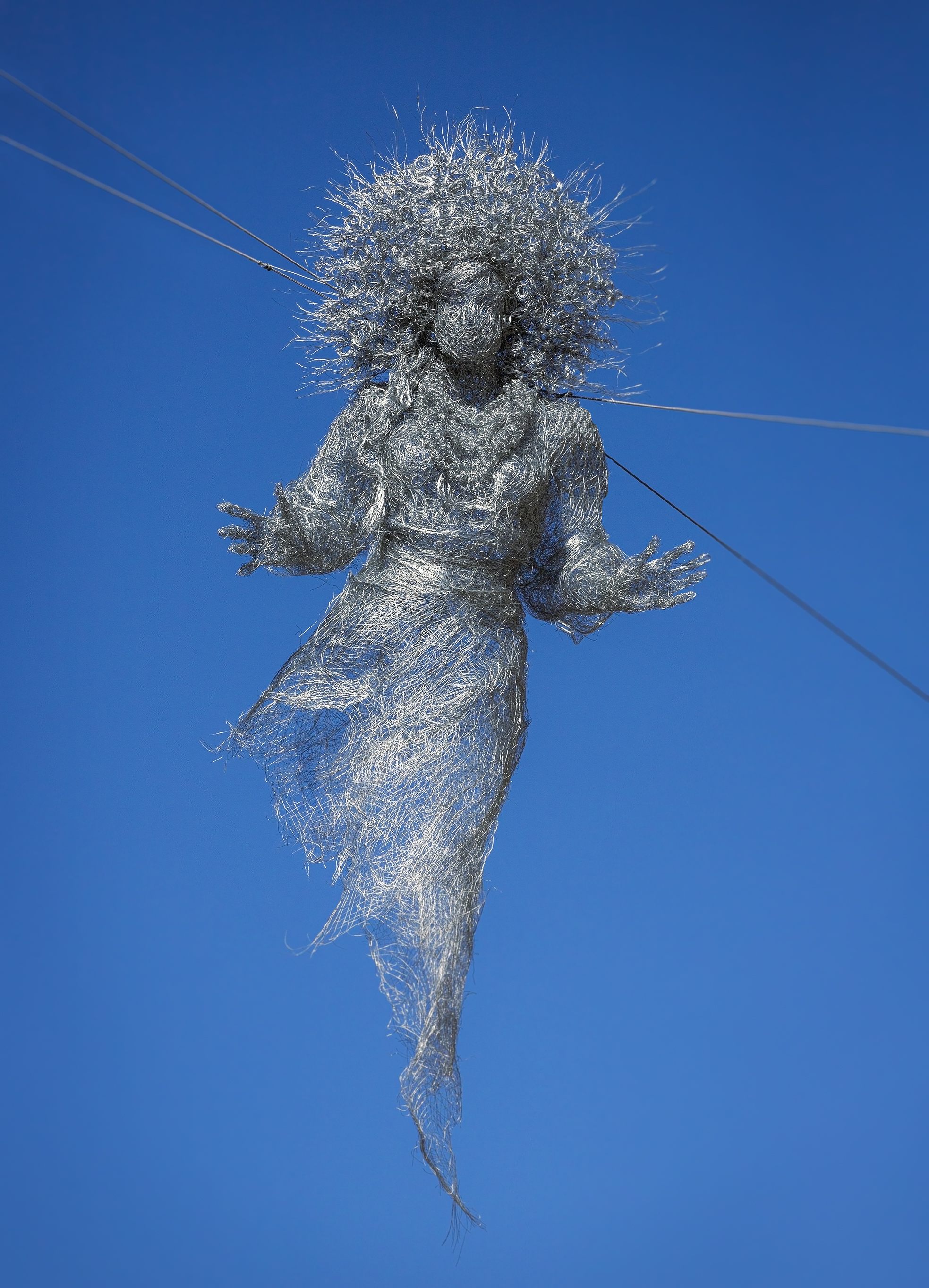
Vinok 2022 NoD Gallery Dlouhá street, Prague

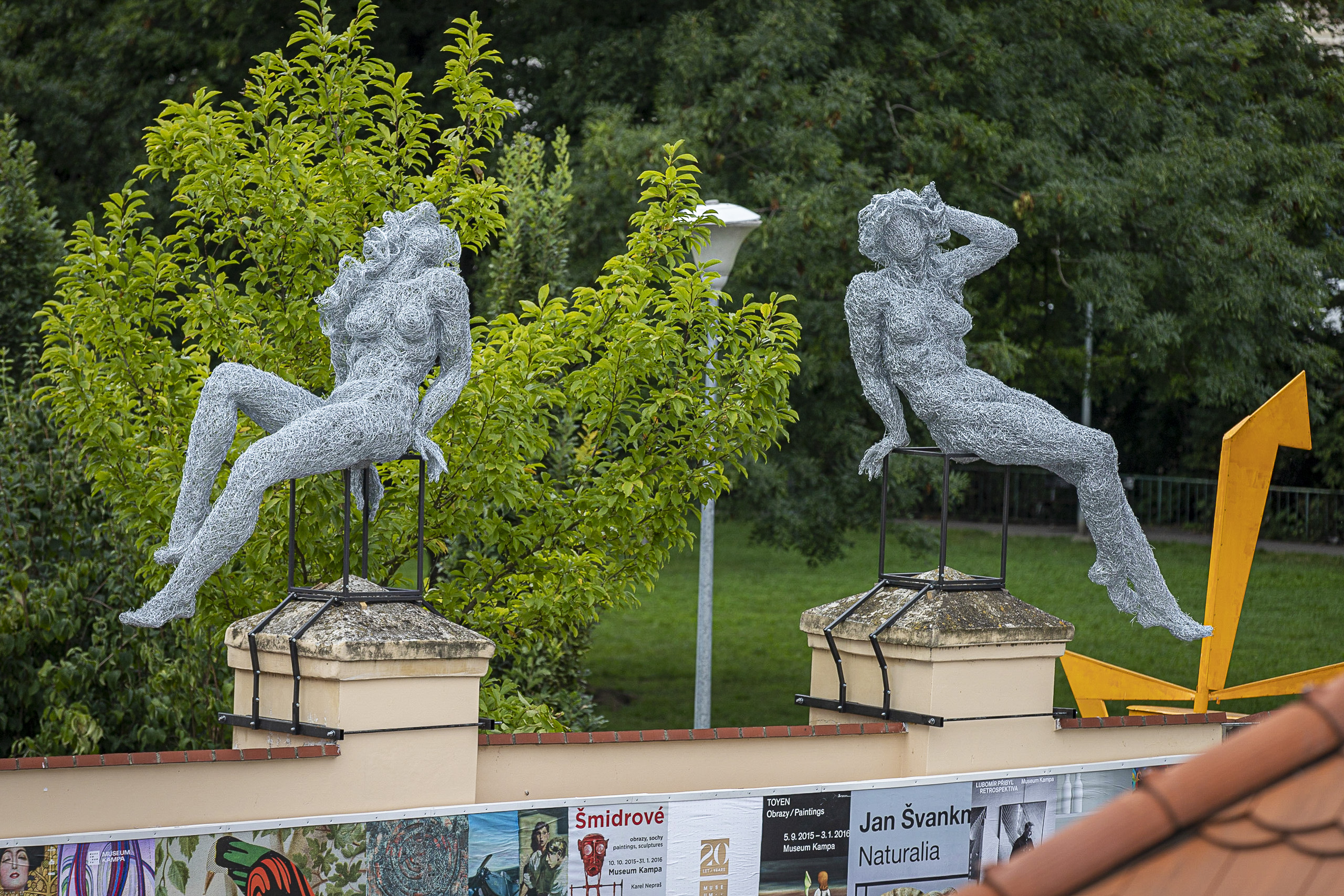
For you, too, Late-and-Cheescake 2023 Kampa Island

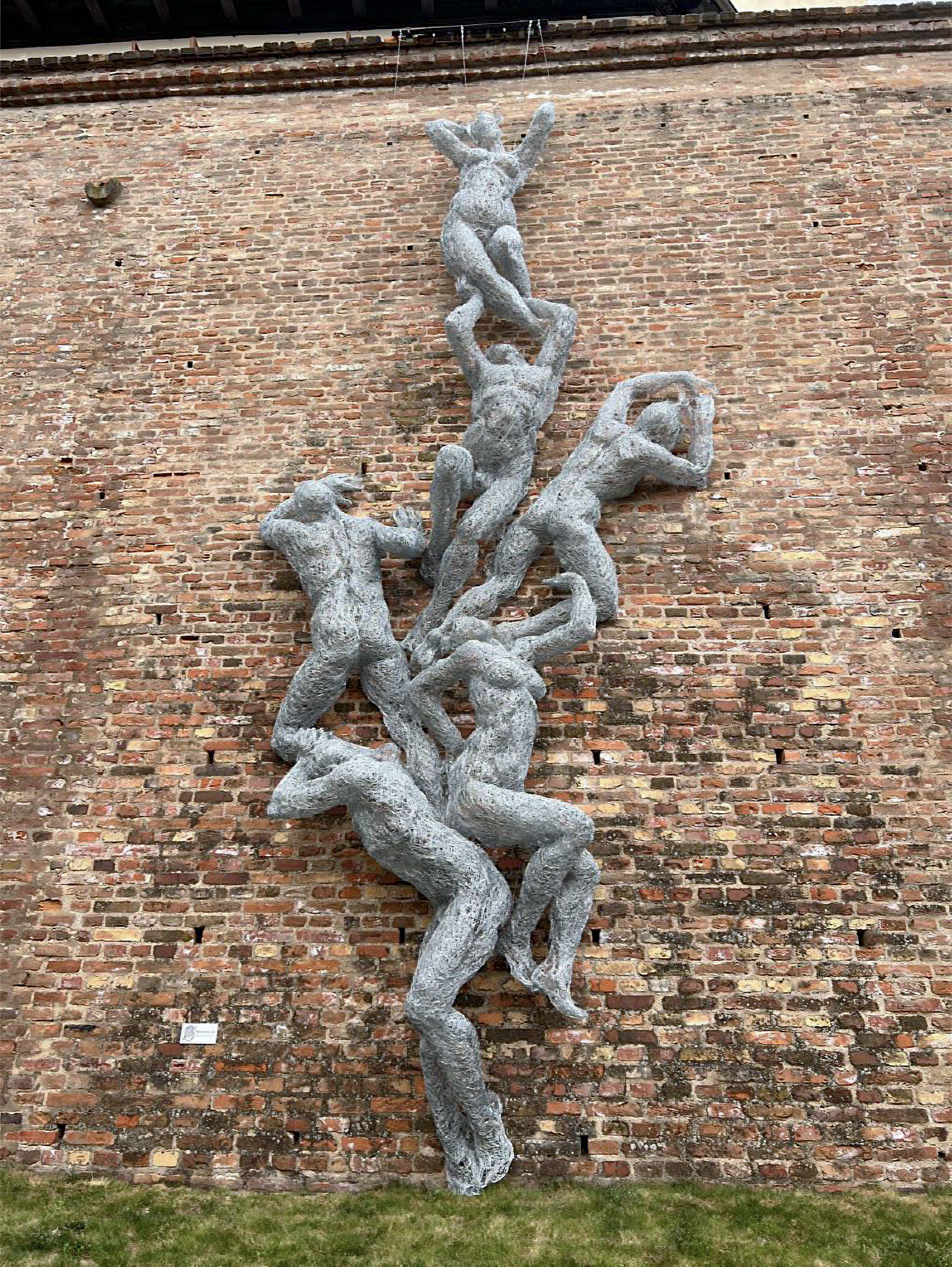
Ivy 2026 site specific, Sculptures at Špilberk Castle, Brno

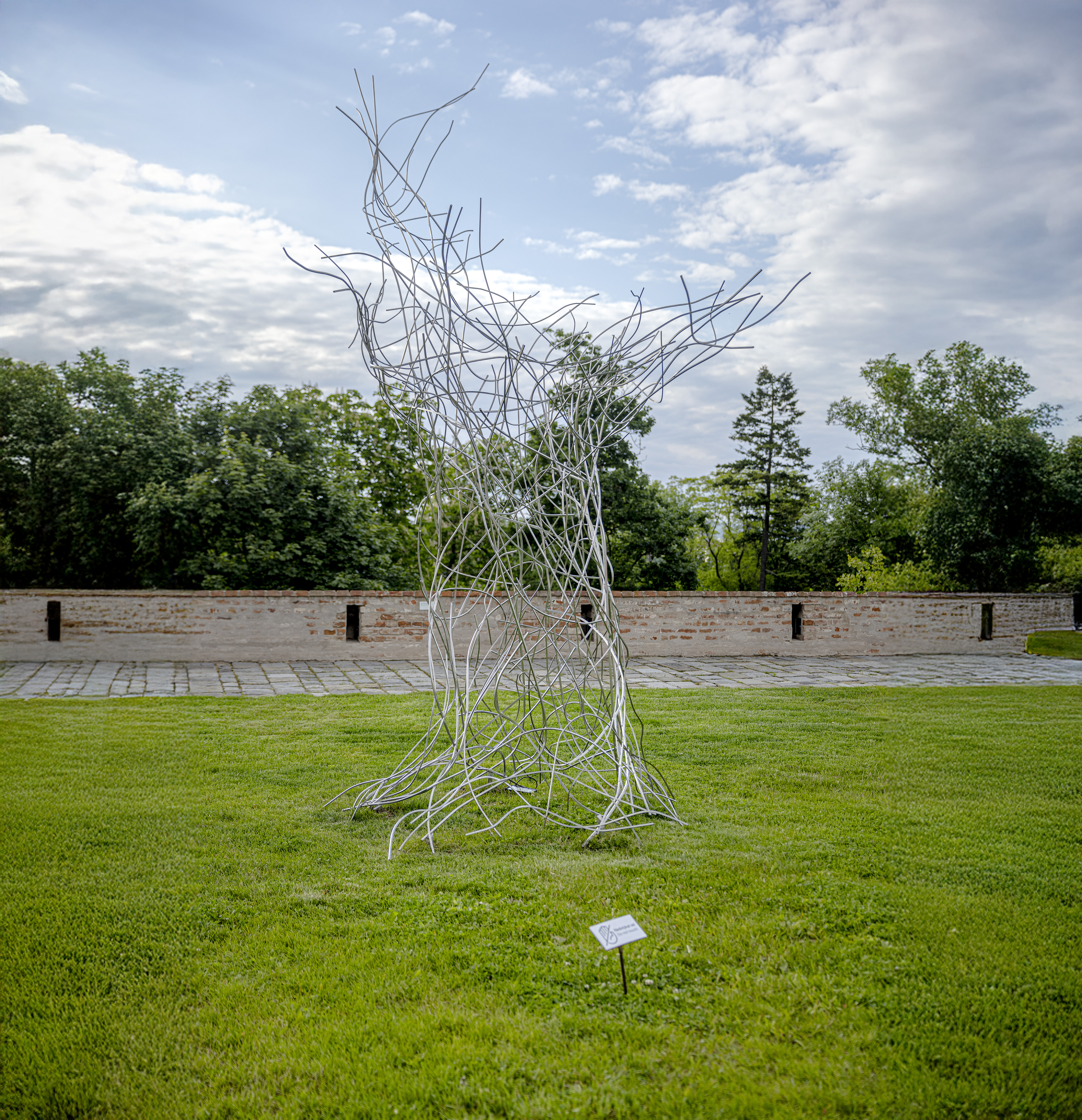
Chapel 2026, Sculptures at Špilberk Castle, Brno

In 2025, she installed the monumental sculpture group Perpetuo in the Church of Santa Maria della Visitazione in Venice. The sculpture, consisting of thirty larger-than-life figures and torsos standing 6 meters tall, created from 1.5 km of wire mesh, weighs 4.5 metric tons including its supporting structure. It is her most extensive exhibition abroad to date. Psotková conceived it as a symbolic loop of scenes from social media (scrolling), reflections of our selves and our carefully cultivated virtual identities. Visitors can enter the installation, contribute to it with their own bodies, document it, and post it on social media. The installation seamlessly explores the concept of identity, which is fleeting and may not correspond to reality at all.

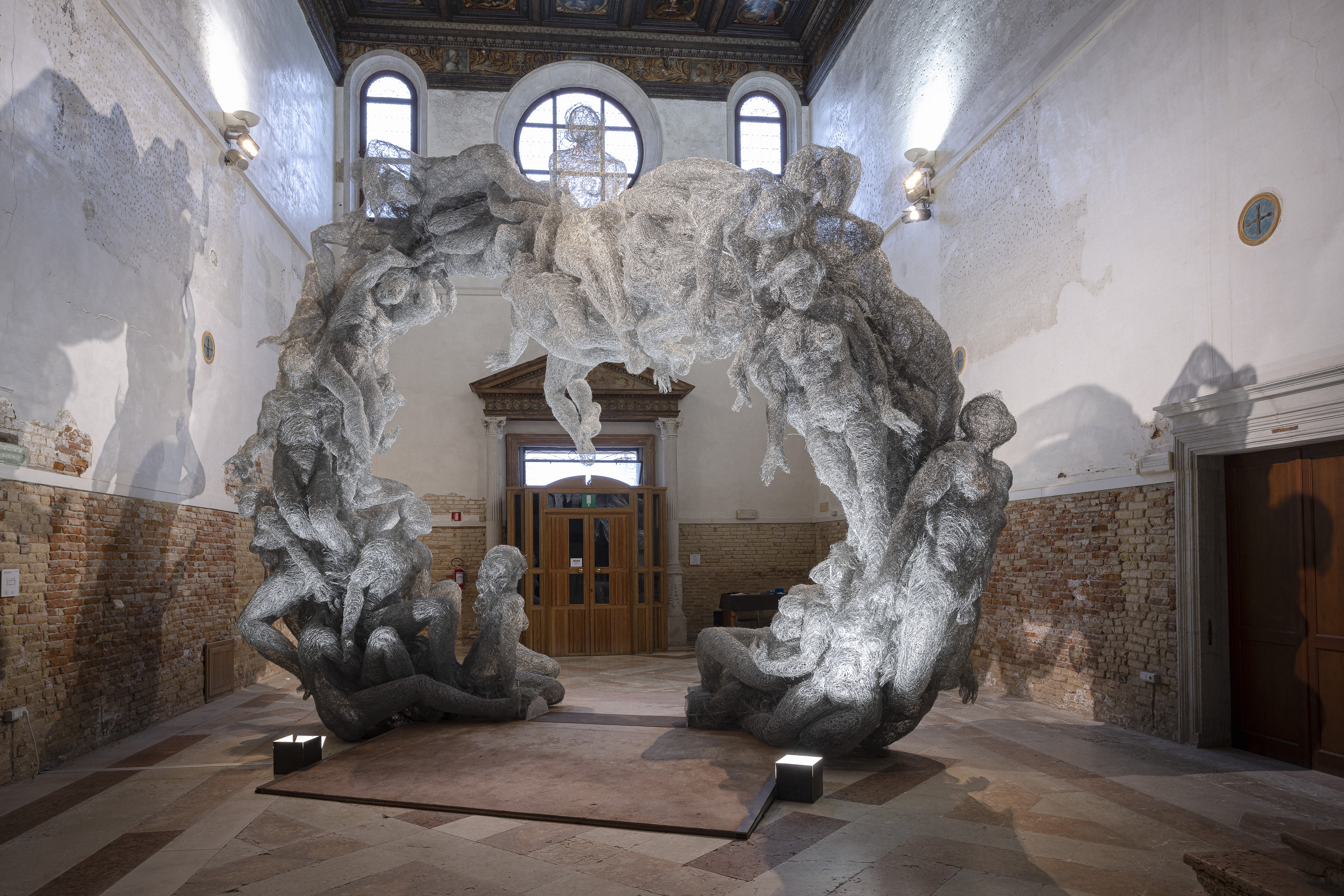
Perpetuo 2025, Chiesa di Santa Maria della Visitazione Venezia

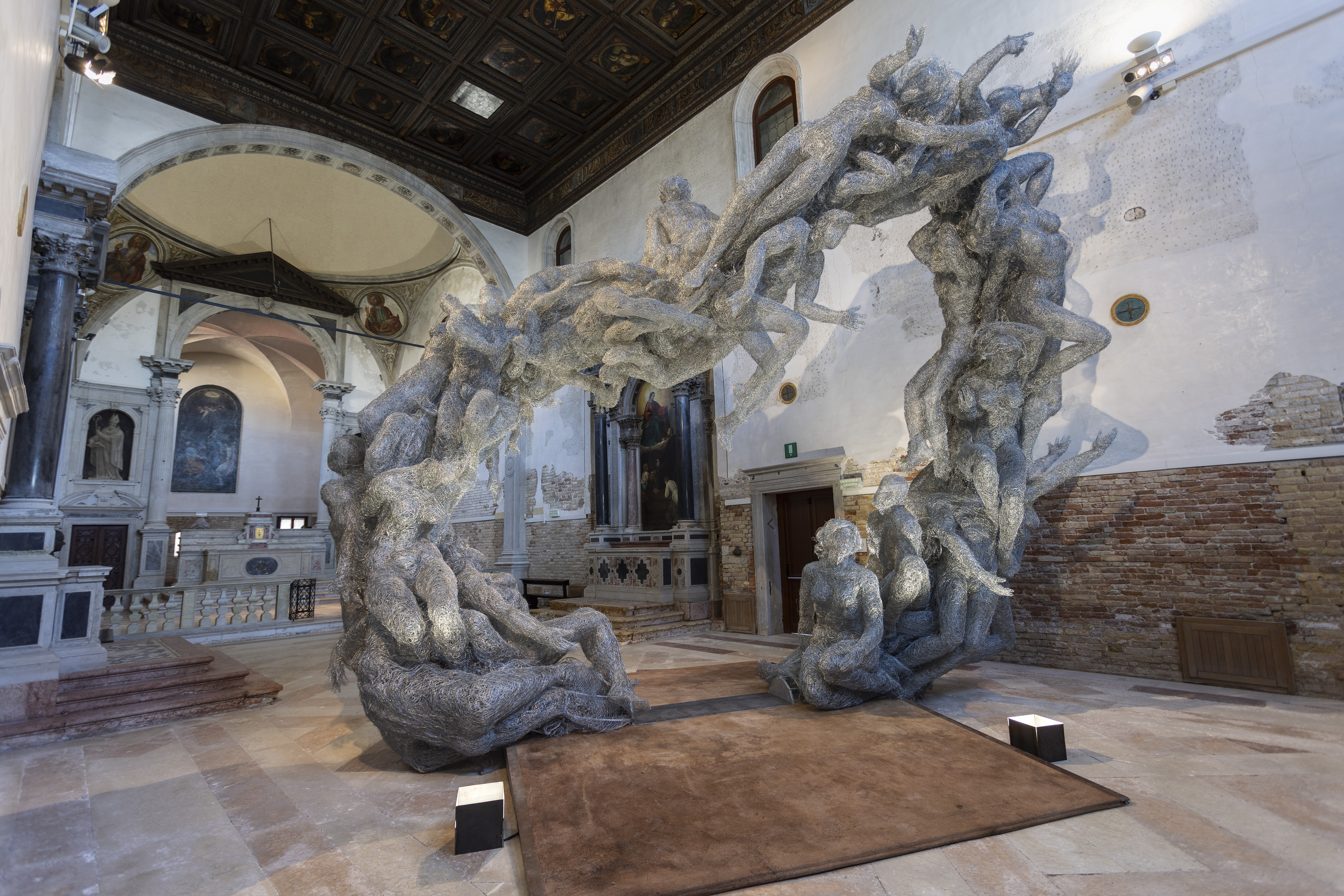
Perpetuo 2025, Chiesa di Santa Maria della Visitazione Venezia

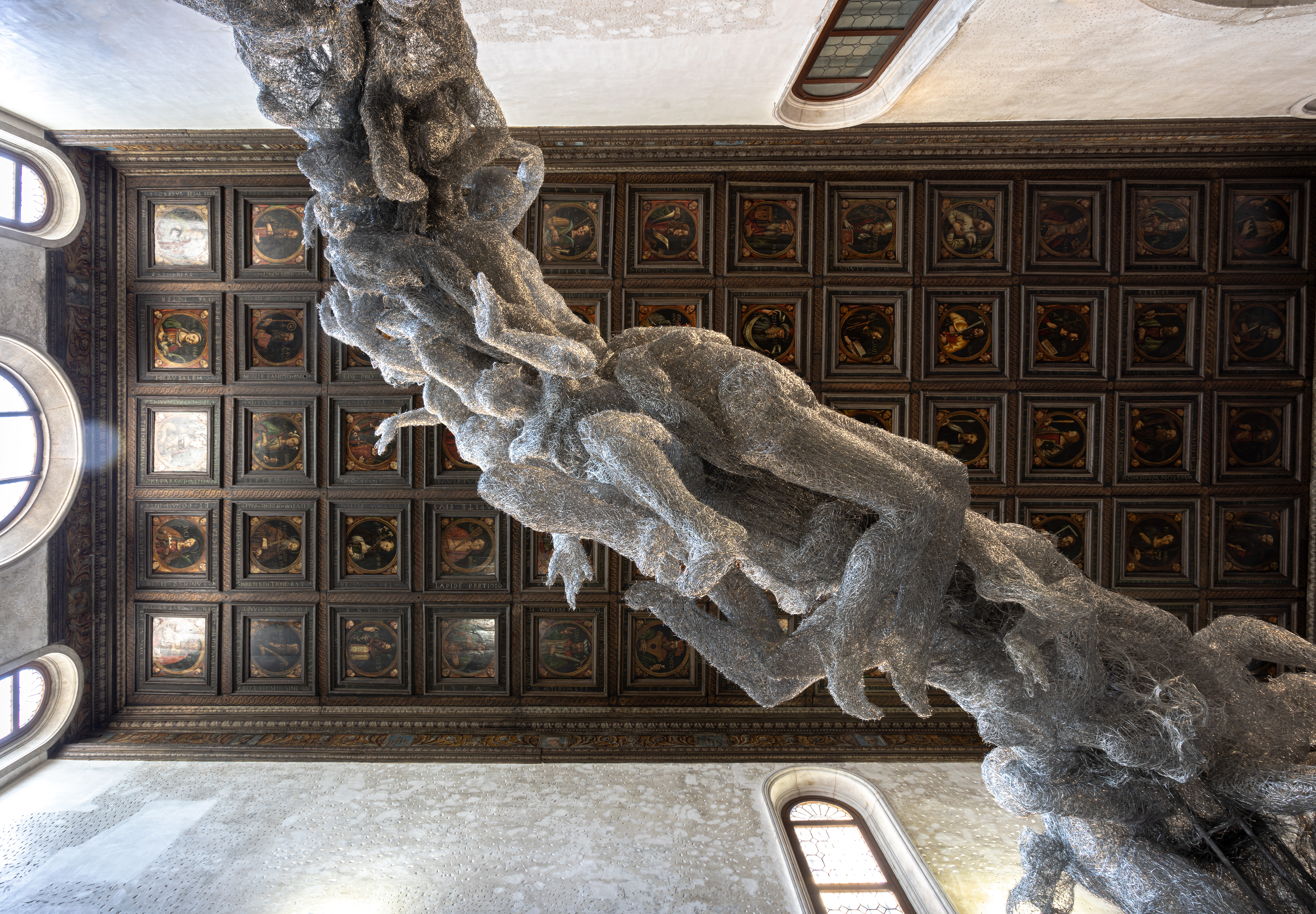
Perpetuo 2025, Chiesa di Santa Maria della Visitazione Venezia

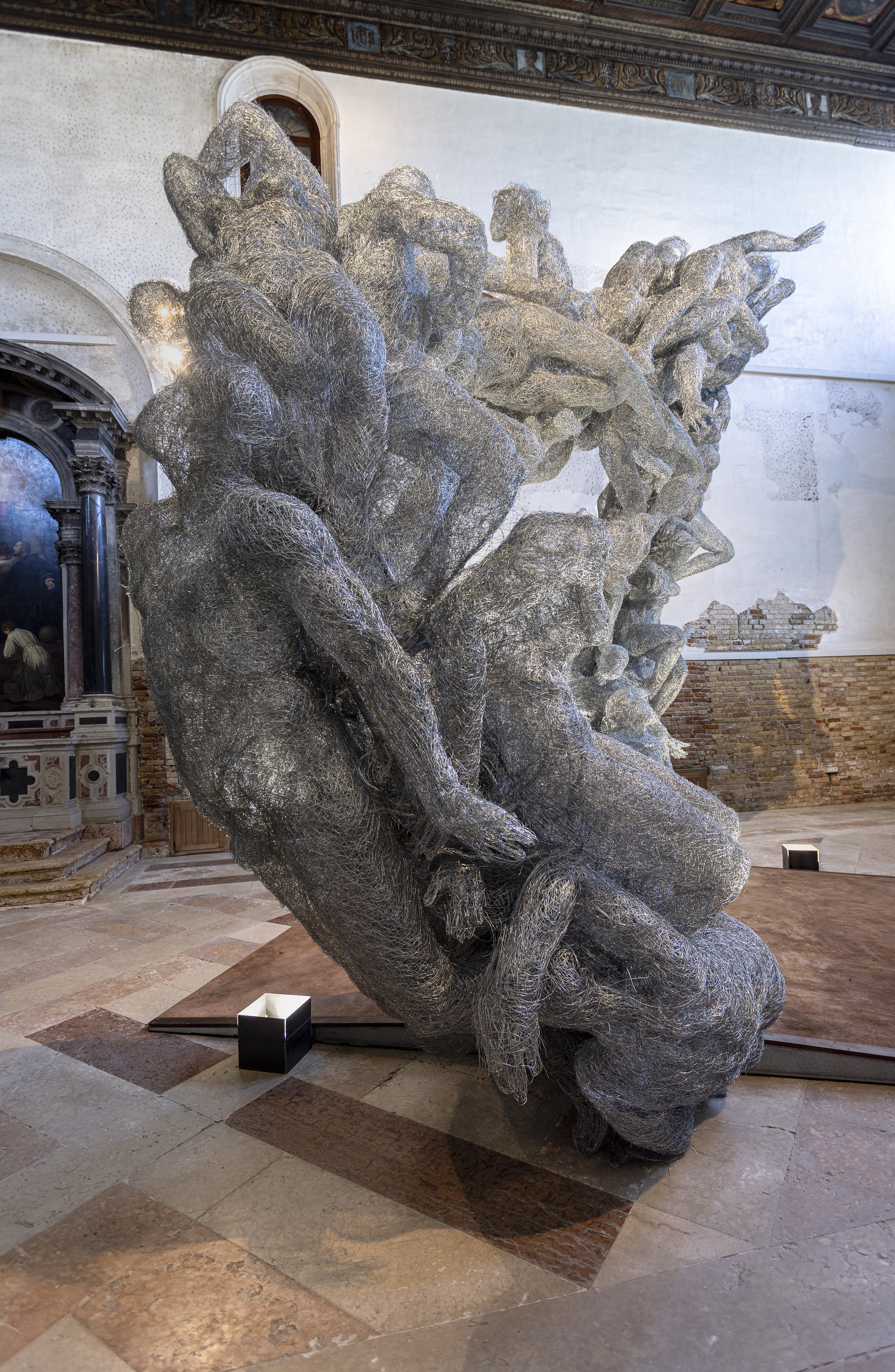
Perpetuo 2025, Chiesa di Santa Maria della Visitazione Venezia

Psotková, together with her husband Roman Kudláček, is the creator of a new exhibition at the Mattoni Museum in Kyselka. She also created a replica of the statue of Heinrich Kaspar von Mattoni for Kyselka, made of hardened and patinated acrylic.

=== Realizations ===
- 2010–2020 Aquabelles, 17 wire-frame female figures at the Forum shopping center in Liberec
- 2010 Nine sculptures on the water cascade at Old Town Square in Mladá Boleslav
- 2012 Sculpture group entitled On the Wall, garden of the Depo restaurant, Český Krumlov
- 2012 Rübezahl, Fries mountain hut complex, Strážné in the Giant Mountains
- 2012–2014 Statues of Bedřich Smetana, Ctirad, and Šárka at the recreational area in Mladá Boleslav
- 2013 Copy of statue of Heinrich Kaspar von Mattoni in Kyselka
- 2016 Gymnasts, wire figures on the facade of the Sokol Hall in Litvínov
- 2020 Sculptures for Šatlava at the Žlutice Museum
- 2020 Altar of St. Joseph, a figural sculpture group depicting St. Joseph with Mary, the Infant Jesus, and angels, in the deconsecrated Church of St. Joseph, Slavětín near Trutnov.
- 2022 Vinok, Dlouhá Street, Prague
- 2023 Latte and Cheesecake, Kampa Island, Prague
- 2024 Ride, Roundabout in Trutnov
- 2024 A Place in the Heart – Forest Cemetery memorial site, Písek
- 2025 Digital Swimmers, ESMO public foyer, Žilina
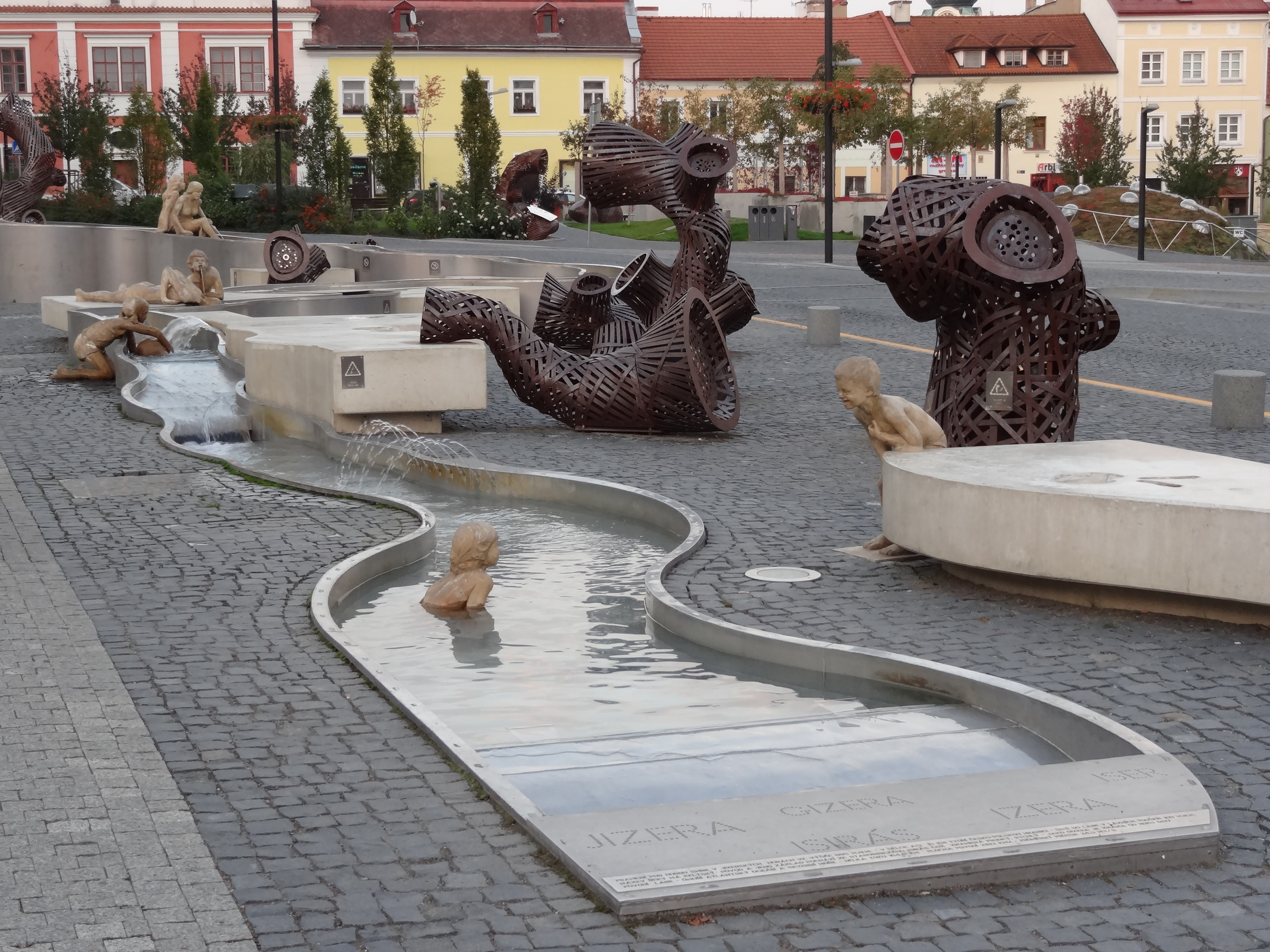
Water cascade (2010), Mladá Boleslav

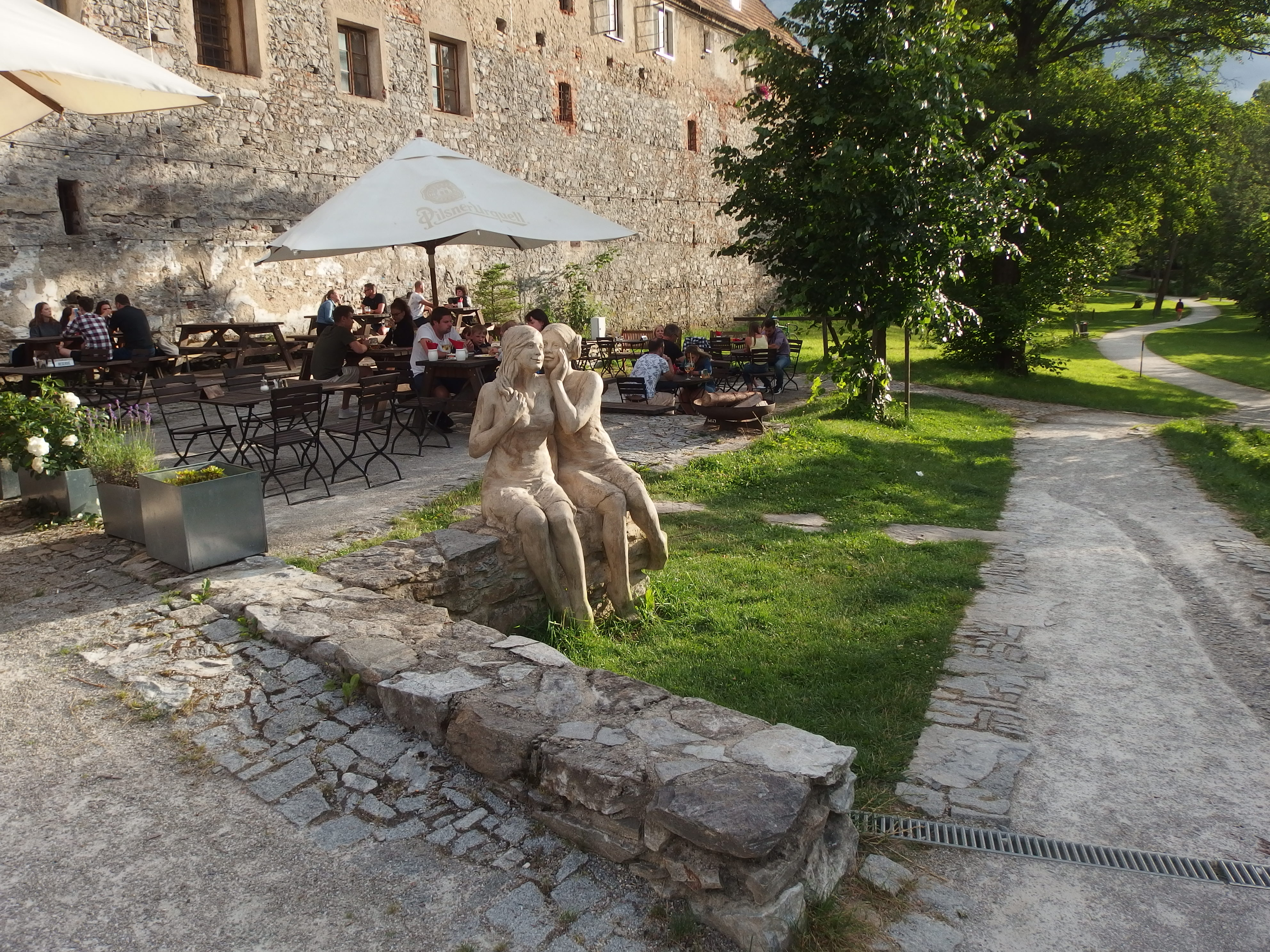
On the Wall (2012), Český Krumlov

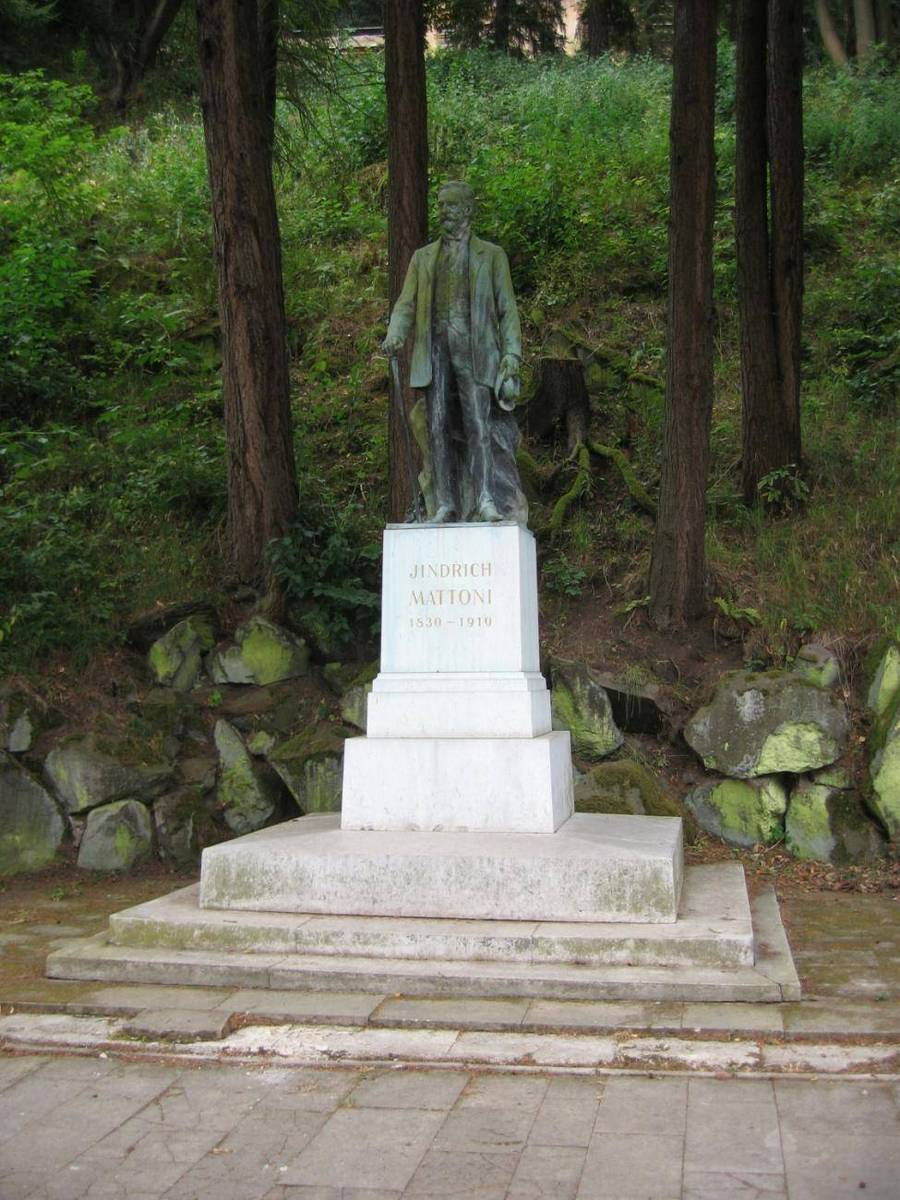
Heinrich Kaspar von Mattoni (2013), Kyselka

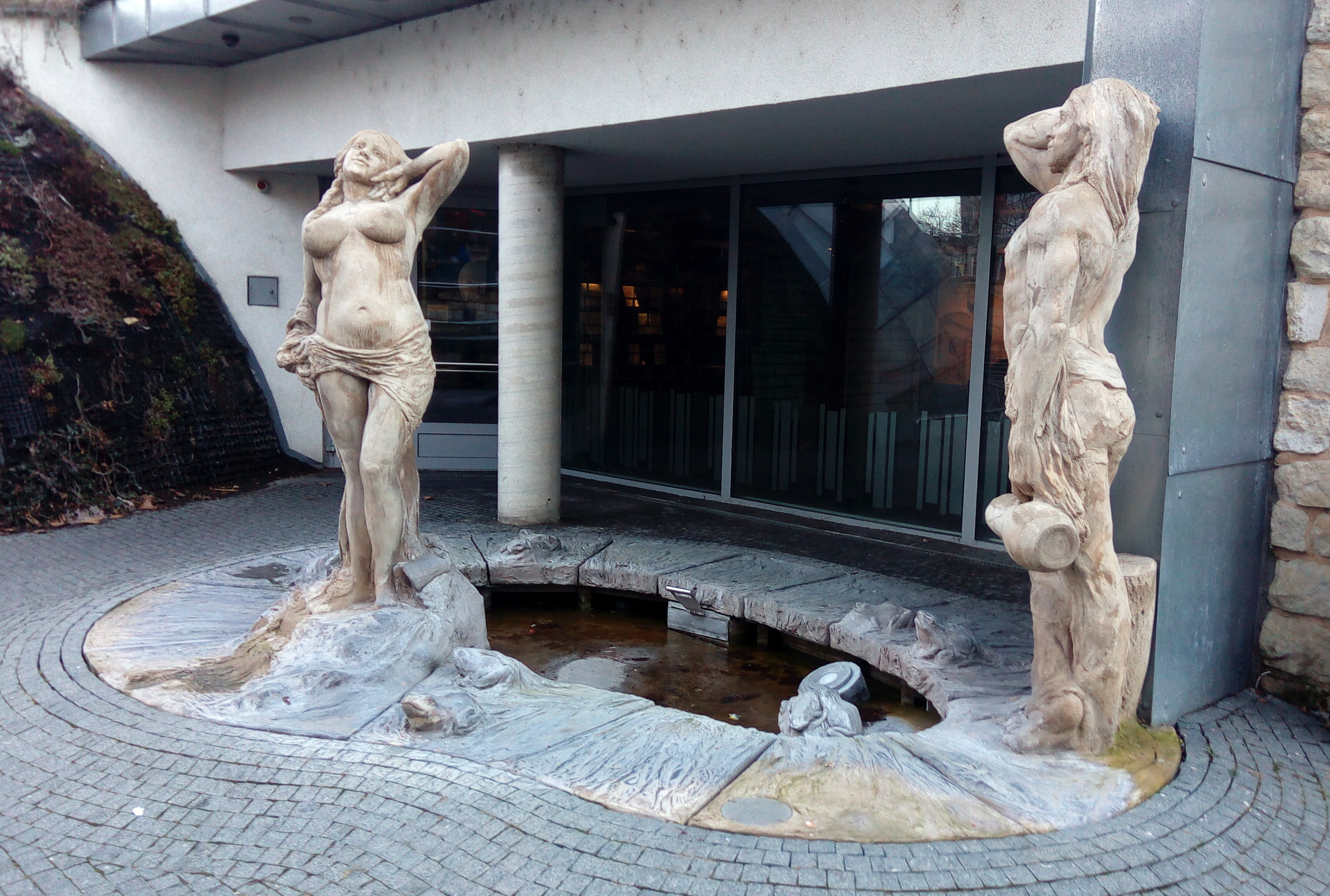
Ctirad and Šárka Fountain (2012–2013), Mladá Boleslav

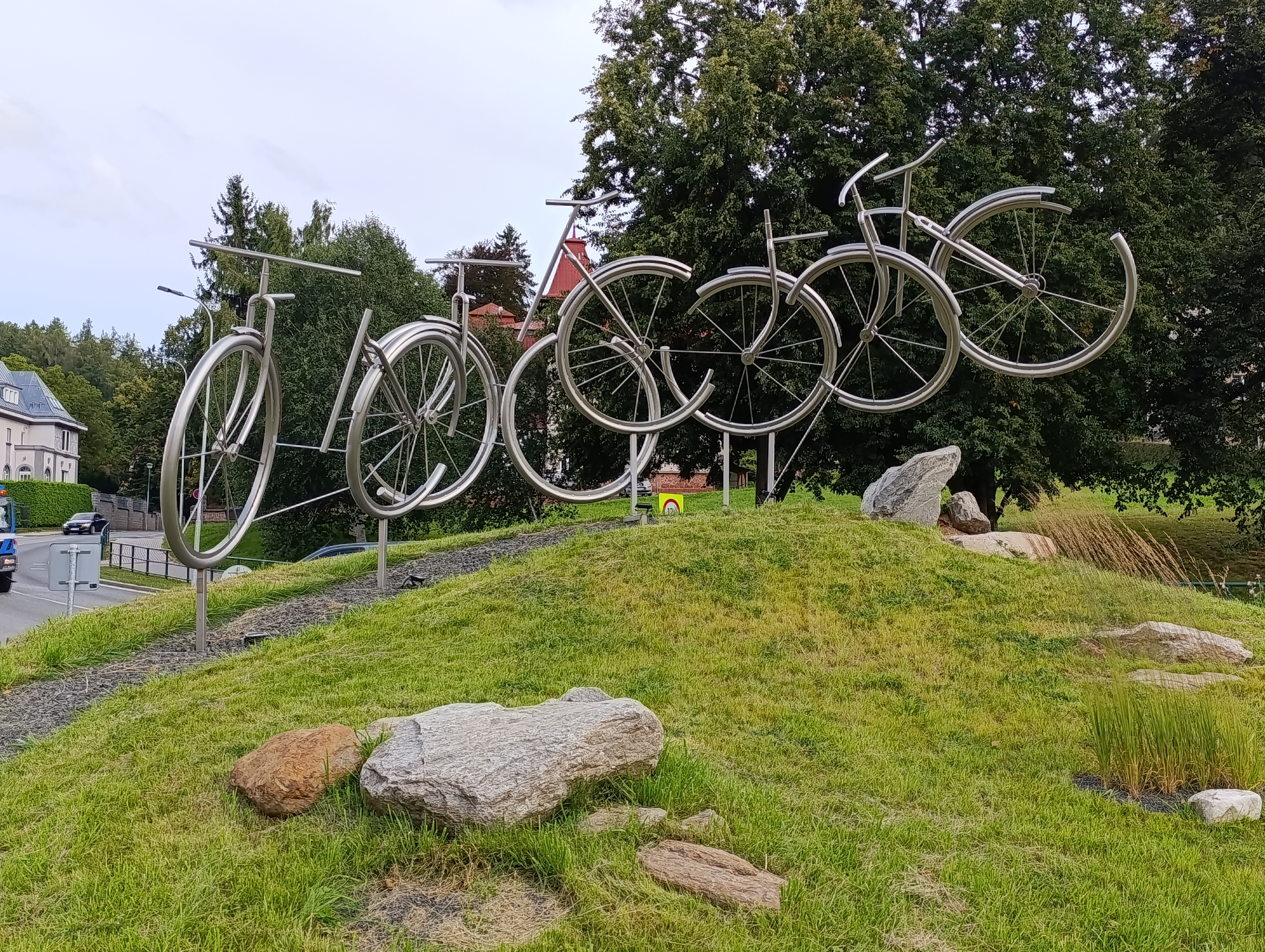
Ride (2024), Trutnov, 2024

=== Exhibitions (selection) ===
==== Solo ====
- 2006 Veronika Psotková: Sochy / Sculptures, Town Museum, Rýmařov
- 2007 Veronika Psotková: Průzkumnice / The Explorer, House of Arts, Opava
- 2009 Veronika Psotková: Dědova zahrada / Grandpa's Garden, DOX, Centrum současného umění / Centre for Contemporary Art, Prague
- 2009 Inventura – Veronika Psotková a hosté / Inventory – Veronika Psotková and Guests, Aula VUT Brno
- 2010 Veronika Psotková: Uzavřená společnost / Private Party, Radniční sklípek Gallery, Litvínov
- 2012 Veronika Psotková: Bikiny klub / Bikini Club, DOX, Centrum současného umění / Centre for Contemporary Art, Prague
- 2012 Veronika Psotková: Classic@., Municipal House, Opava
- 2013 Veronika Psotková: Bikini Club/ Sauna, (A)VOID Floating Gallery, Prague
- 2013 Bikini klubben och Bastu, Härjedalens kulturcentrum, Lillhärdal, Sweden
- 2013 Veronika Psotková: Bikini, Koktebel Jazz Festival, Koktebel/Crimea/Ukraine
- 2014 Veronika Psotková: Akvárium / Aquarium, The Town Hall Cellar Gallery, Litvínov
- 2015 Veronika Psotková: 500 m² rabicovej sietě / 500 m² of wire nettig mesh, Budatín Castle, Žilina, Slovakia
- 2015 Veronika Psotková: Velké prádlo, Polštáře / Big Laundry, Pillars, New Town Hall, Prague
- 2015 Veronika Psotková: Akvabely / Aquabelles, installation under the bridge on Rašínovo Embankment – (A)VOID Gallery, Prague
- 2017 Veronika Psotková: Bikini Club, Castle Litvínov
- 2018 Veronika Psotková: Solitéry / Standalone Pieces, Hotel Rott, Prague
- 2018/2019 Veronika Psotková: Napojení / Connection, Lower Vítkovice, Ostrava, Sculptures in the City, Town Gallery Trutnov
- 2019 Veronika Psotková: DOMA / At home, Municipal House Gallery, Opava
- 2019 Veronika Psotková: Klenot I / Jewel I, Muzeum papírových modelů / Museum of Paper Models, Police nad Metují
- 2019/2020 Veronika Psotková: Spolu / Together, DOX, Centrum současného umění / Centre for Contemporary Art, Praha
- 2021 Veronika Psotková: Esence / Essence, Gallery of Fine Arts in Náchod
- 2021 Veronika Psotková: Drátěné sochy / Wire Sculptures, Art Gallery (Světlana & Luboš Jelínek), Chrudim
- 2021 Veronika Psotková: Dive-in, (A)VOID Gallery, a vault on the Prague riverfront
- 2022 Veronika Psotková: Himmel und Erde (+Angelika Summa), Garten Pristine, Hanover, Germany
- 2022 Veronika Psotková: Grácie / Graces, Chapel Gallery, Valašské Meziříčí
- 2022 Veronika Psotková: Holky z kruhu / Girls from the Circle, DON Tábor
- 2023 Veronika Psotková: Dive-In/ End of the Tunnel, Machine Room, EPO1 Center for Contemporary Art, Trutnov
- 2023 Veronika Psotková: Kůže líná / Lazy Skin, Cultural Center Liberec-Vratislavice nad Nisou
- 2022/2023 Veronika Psotková: Vinok, Roxy/NoD, crossroads Dlouhá – Rybná, Prague 1
- 2024 Veronika Psotková: Beze strachu / Without Fear, culture center KKCG Artium, Prague 6
- 2025 Liberata, Stage Garden, Rožnov pod Radhoštěm
- 2025/2026 Veronika Psotková: Swimmers, The Dancing House, Sculpture Line, Prague
- 2025 PERPETUO, Chiesa di Santa Maria della Visitazione, Venice
- 2026 Sochy na hradě IV / Sculptures at the Castle IV -Veronika Psotková, Brno City Museum - Špilberk

==== Collective (selection) ====
- 2006 Figurama 06, Bratislava, Plzeň, Znojmo, Ostrava
- 2006 Posluchači ateliéru sochařství Michala Gabriela / Students in Michal Gabriel's sculpture studio, Doubner Gallery, Prague
- 2008 Hloubka a cit / Depth and Sensitivity, Castle Gallery, Uherský Ostroh
- 2008 Třeskutý testosteron / Explosive Testosterone, Mázhaus Gallery, Pardubice
- 2009 Figurama 09, Zlín, Poznań, České Budějovice, Brussels, Old Town Hall Prague
- 2009/2010 Dívčí sen 2009 Testosteron/ Girl´s Dream 2009: Testosterone, Regional Gallery of the Highlands Jihlava, Reduta Theatre, Brno, Synagogue Gallery, Hranice, Michal Mine, Michálkovice, Ostrava
- 2009 Pygmalionka a Narcis – fotograficko-sochařské projekty Veroniky Psotkové a Miroslava Jiřeleho / Pygmalion and Narcis – Photography and Sculpture Projects by Veronika Psotková and Miroslav Jiřele, Doma Gallery, Kyjov
- 2009 Doxnano!, DOX, Centrum současného umění / Centre for Contemporary Art, Prague
- 2009 Practical Theses by 2009 Graduates of the Faculty of Fine Arts, Brno University of Technology, Aula Gallery of the Faculty of Fine Arts, Brno
- 2009 Eastnano!, Faculty of Chemical Technology, Pardubice University
- 2010 AS1: Práce studentů, absolventů a pedagogů Ateliéru sochařství 1 / Works by Students, Graduates, and Teachers of the Sculpture Studio 1, FaVU VUT Brno, DOX, Centrum současného umění / Centre for Contemporary Art, Prague
- 2011 Sochy v zahradě II / Sculptures in the garden II, Kroměříž
- 2012 Sochy v zahradě III / Sculptures in the garden III, Kroměříž
- 2014 Umění ve městě / Art in the City 2014, České Budějovice
- 2015 Umění ve městě / Art in the City 2015, České Budějovice
- 2016 Umění ve městě / Art in the City 2016, České Budějovice
- 2017 Umění ve městě / Art in the City 2017, České Budějovice
- 2025 Němá tvář / The Silent Face, Regional Gallery of Fine Arts in Zlín

== Sources ==
=== Catalogues ===
- Veronika Psotková: Esence (Umělci do 40 let) / Essence (Artists Under 40), Náchod Gallery of Fine Arts 2021, ISBN 978-80-88341-08-6
- Alžběta Krajčíková, Beze strachu / No Fear (Veronika Psotková), KKCG, Prague 2024

=== Exhibition catalogues ===
- Figurama 06, 351 p., KANT Publishing (Karel Kerlický), Prague 2006, ISBN 80-86970-08-6
- 15 let FaVU VUT v Brně / 15 years of FaVU VUT in Brno, 229 p., VUTIUM Publishing House, Brno 2008, ISBN 978-80-214-3633-6
- Dívčí sen 2009 (Testosteron) / A Girl's Dream 2009 (Testosterone), text Barbora Lungová, Uff!Art Civic Association 2009, ISBN 978-80-254-5545-6
- Figurama 09, 528 p., Růžolící Chrochtík (publishing house), Prague 2009, ISBN 80-903346-6-0
- Nanoscope (An interdisciplinary project connecting art, science, and technology), 2009
- Výstava praktických diplomových prací 2009 / The Graduates Exhibition 2009, text Kaliopi Chamonikola, Faculty of Fine Arts, Brno University of Technology 2009, ISBN 978-80-214-3918-4
- AS1 - Exhibition by the Sculpture 1 Studio at the Faculty of Fine Arts, Brno University of Technology, text Michal Gabriel, 2010
- 10 let Umění ve městě / 10 Years of “Art in the City”, Flera ltd., Prague 2017, ISBN 978-80-270-1911-3
