= Kyselka Spa =

Former public bath complex in Kyselka, Czech Republic

Coordinates: 50°15′47.72″N 12°59′54.29″E

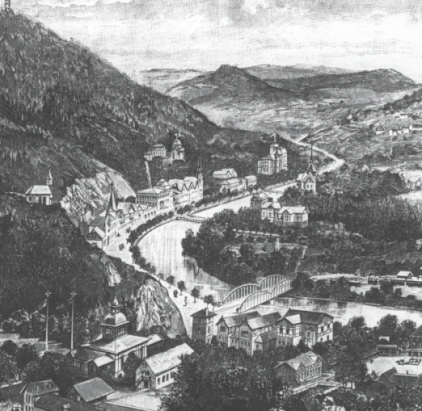
View of the Kyselka Spa/Bad Giesshübl in 1902

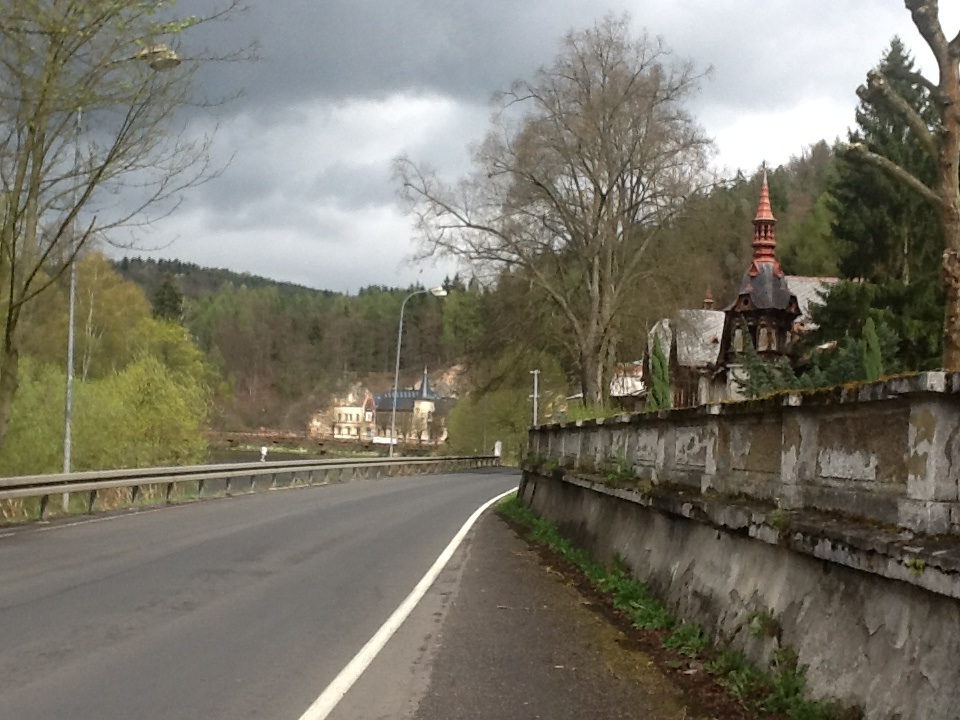
Kyselka Spa 2014

The Kyselka Spa (Czech: Lázně Kyselka; German: Bad Giesshübl), older name Kysibl, is a complex of former public baths in the village of Kyselka in the vicinity of Karlovy Vary in the Czech Republic.

== History ==
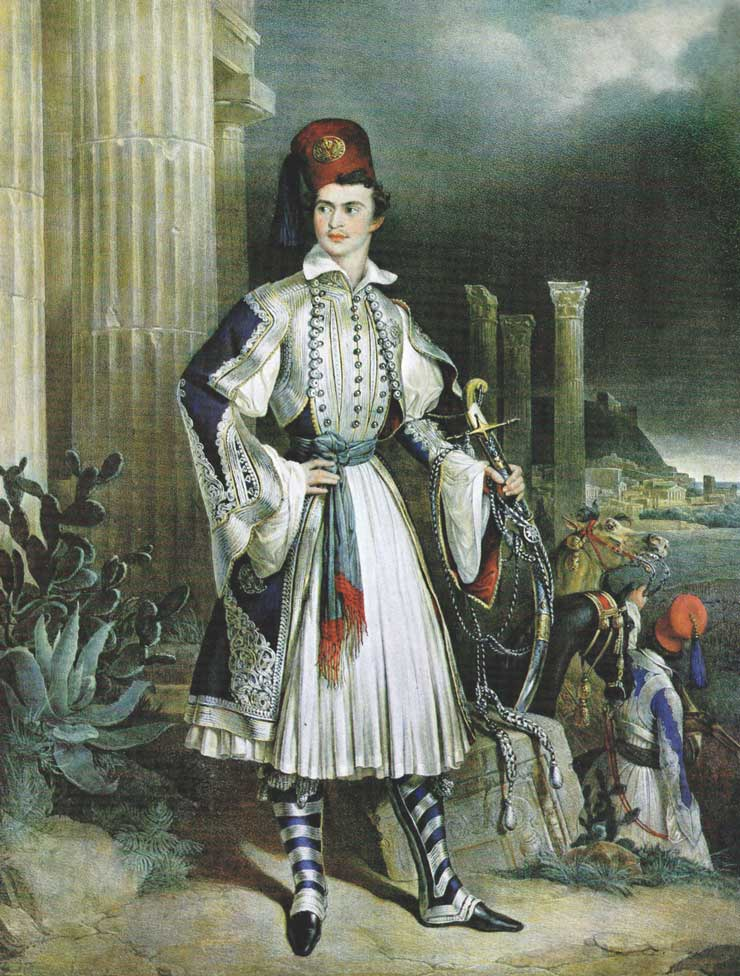
King Otto of Greece was one of the most famous visitors, he even had the water brought to Athens.

The local springs had been discovered hundreds of years ago; the first written account dates back to 1522. In the 17th century the counts of Černín permitted their subjects to drink the Kyselka mineral water for free. The springs were first used for spa purposes in 1792 when the location was already widely known. The first spa buildings were built in the years 1826–1832 by Wilhelm von Neuberg. The fame of the spa and the tasty water was growing; in 1852 Otto of Greece visited the place and the main spring was named after him. In the course of time the spring had several owners; one of them, count Johann Joseph von Stiebar auf Buttenheim, came up with the idea to export the mineral water (1824) and established a small factory for the production of clay jugs in which the water was bottled. The local water was then sold in Vienna, Prague and also in Karlsbad.

=== Mattoni's era ===
In 1867 the main spring was rented by the Czech businessman of Italian-German origin Heinrich K. Mattoni who began to bottle the water in glass bottles and export it worldwide. In 1873 he had enough money to buy the spa and the surrounding land. Before he died in 1910, he managed to build a new colonnade which roofed the famous "Otta's spring" as well as the buildings of the sanatorium, the hydropathic institute, hotels, restaurants, promenades, the cableway, the chapel of Saint Anne (1884), his monumental residence ("The Chateau"), a hydroelectric power station and the buildings of the bottling plant. Finally he brought railway here so that quietness of the spa was not disturbed by wagons carting mineral water. During his epoch the spa flourished and it has not reached such prosperity ever since. Mattoni's descendants nevertheless kept this property until the end of World War II.

=== In the hands of the state ===
After the war, the buildings shortly served as a refugee camp for orphans from the Greek Civil War and after that as a sanatorium for children. It was closed down after the fall of the Communist regime in 1989. During this period, the premises deteriorated to some degree but were at least somehow maintained.

== The current situation ==
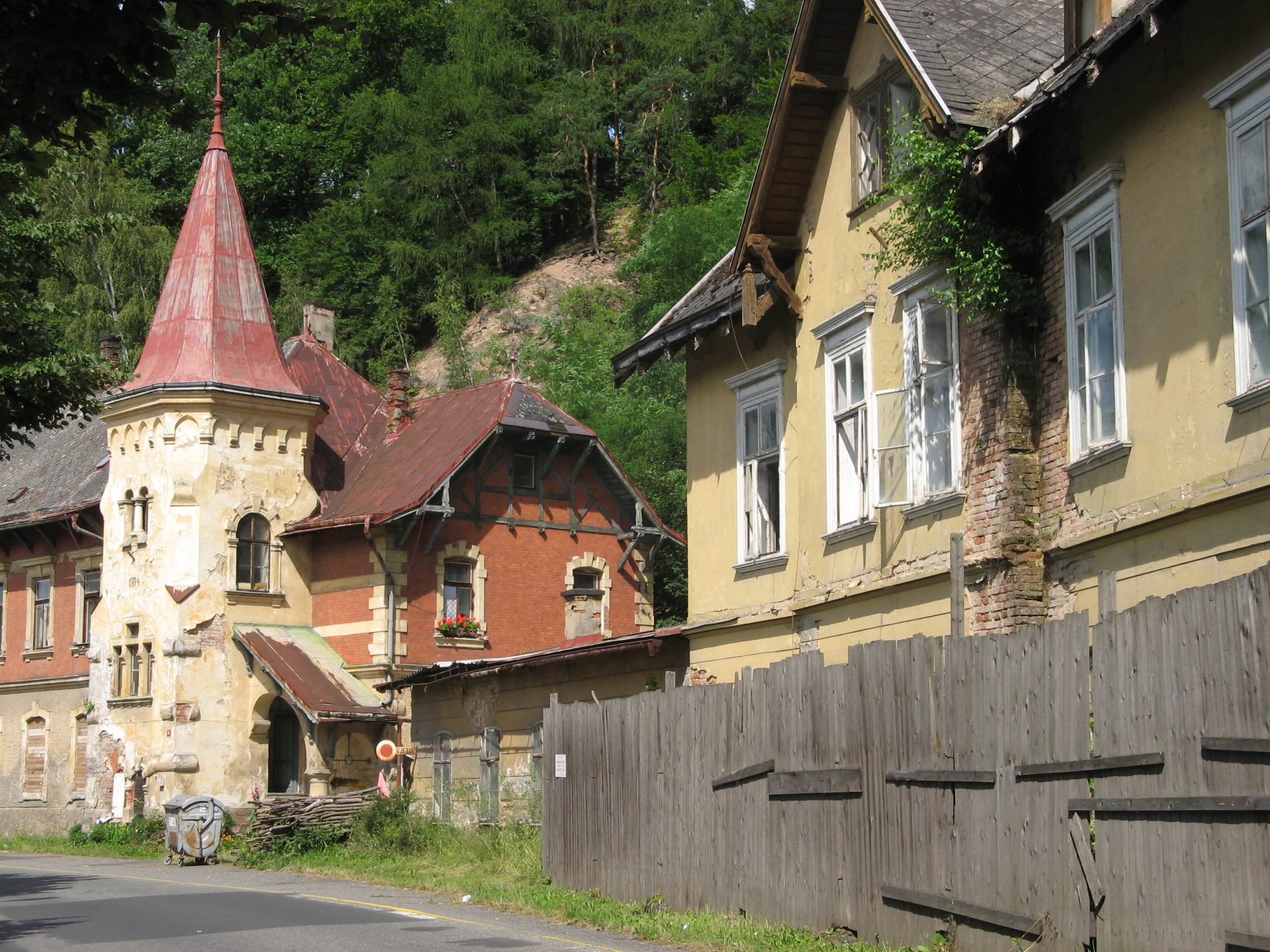
Deteriorating spa buildings – August 2010 (the house with a spire belongs to KMV a.s. and is still in use)

Since the chaotic voucher privatization between 1991 and 1993, the spa has had several owners. None of them was able or willing to save the spa or at least partially prevent it from dilapidation. Today (2012) the buildings are partially inaccessible, the water springs in rubble heaps of the buildings and leaks into the foundations. Many of the buildings are doomed to demolition. The whole site is moreover burdened with freight (few hundred trucks a day), as the railway was closed down. The current proprietors are the company C.T.S. – DUO and the Carlsbad Mineral Waters owned by the Italian tycoon A. Pasquale who owns the bottling plant and the Mattoni brand as well. The owners have repeatedly promised to renovate the complex, but it becomes obvious that they are counting on the buildings being torn down. All this in spite of the opinion of the Preservation of Monuments bureau, of the attitude of the representatives of the Karlovy Vary Region as well as a quite strong civil movement (over 28,000 signatures) led by the Association for the Protection and Development of the Cultural Heritage of the Czech Republic (ASORKD).
