= Hans-Julius Ahlmann =

Entrepreneur & Cultural sponsor

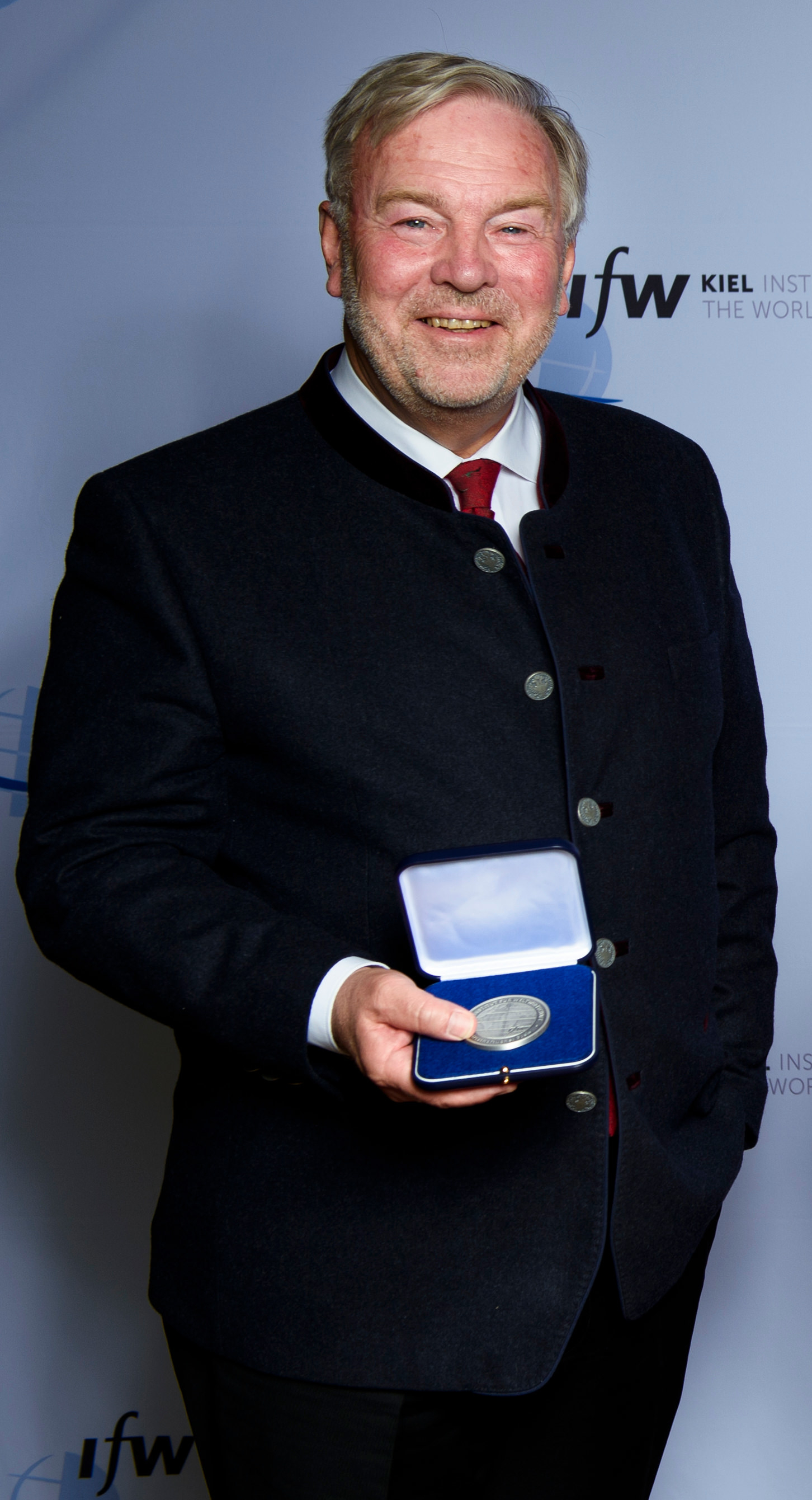
- Hans-Julius Ahlmann (2022)
- Born: 1952 (age 73–74); Rendsburg
- Occupations: entrepreneur and cultural sponsor

Hans-Julius Ahlmann (born April 14, 1952, in Rendsburg) is a Schleswig-Holstein entrepreneur and holds the role of managing partner at ACO Severin Ahlmann GmbH & Co. KG.

== Early life ==
His parents are the entrepreneur Hans-Julius Ahlmann (1919-1952) from Rendsburg and Juliane Ahlmann (1926-2020), from Dillenburg. After the premature death of his father, his mother married the entrepreneur Hans Jacob Jebsen. Hans-Julius Ahlmann is the grandson of the entrepreneur Käte Ahlmann (1890-1963), head of the Ahlmann-Carlshütte iron foundry in Rendsburg. As a child he spent periods of time in Rendsburg, Hong Kong, Apenrade (DK) and Dillenburg (Hesse). He moved on to study mechanical engineering with a specialization in production technology at the RWTH Aachen University and completed postgraduate studies in labor and economics (AWA) at the Technical University of Munich, with a diploma thesis in the field of marketing.

== Career ==
He began his professional career in the central staff of MAN AG in Augsburg, where he published on the subject of "manufacturing islands." In 1981, Ahlmann joined ACO Severin Ahlmann GmbH & Co. KG, the company of his uncle, the entrepreneur Severin Ahlmann. During his lifetime, Ahlmann's uncle transferred the majority of his company shares to his nephew. Today, Ahlmann's son, Iver Ahlmann, is the majority shareholder of the ACO company as part of the process and preparation of early succession. Since 2012, Hans-Julius and Iver Ahlmann have jointly run the family business as managing partners.

Since joining the company in 1981, Ahlmann has expanded the national and international influence of the ACO group of companies. Through strategic acquisitions such as the takeover of Passavant GmbH in 2000, as well as the establishment of new production and sales companies in around 40 countries, Ahlmann has been able to expand the company into a global market leader in the field of drainage technology (building and surface drainage). With sales of €900 million in 2019 and 5000 employees worldwide, ACO ranks among the most successful family-owned companies in Schleswig-Holstein.

== Cultural commitment ==
Ahlmann and his family also has made a major commitment to art and culture. Together with the artist couple Wolfgang Gramm and Inga Aru, they run NordArt. This is one of the largest international and annually juried exhibitions of contemporary art in Europe. NordArt takes place in the historic halls of the Kunstwerk Carlshütte and the adjoining sculpture park, and attracts more than 100,000 visitors each year. Moreover, a specially prepared historic building on the grounds is the rehearsal and concert venue for the Schleswig-Holstein Music Festival.

== Honors ==
- 2016: Order of Merit of the Federal Republic of Germany
