= Mattoni 1873 =

Czech beverage company

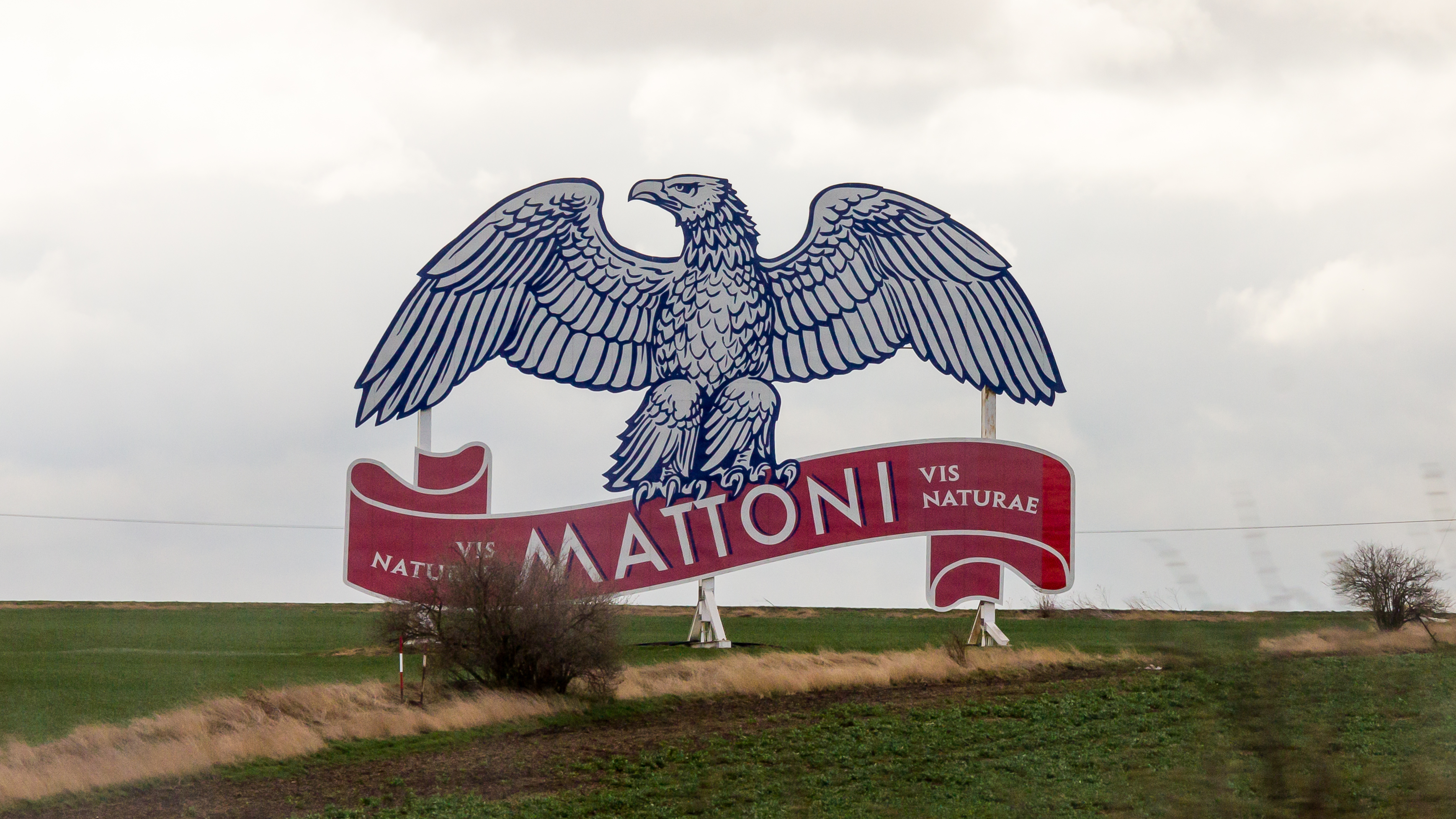
- Company logo
- Type: Joint-stock company
- Industry: Drink industry
- Founded: 1873 in Kyselka
- Founder: Heinrich Mattoni
- Headquarters: Karlovy Vary, Czechia
- Area served: Central Europe
- Key people: Alessandro Pasquale
- Products: Beverages
- Revenue: 3,626,624,000 Czech koruna (2018)
- Operating income: 355,089,000 Czech koruna (2018)
- Net income: 441,977,000 Czech koruna (2018)
- Total assets: 6,446,356,000 Czech koruna (2018)
- Owner: Pasquale family
- Number of employees: 468 (2018)
- Parent: Trentop Investments
- Website: mattoni1873.cz

Mattoni 1873 (known as Karlovarské minerální vody until 2019) is a Czech beverage company that bottles and distributes the Mattoni brand of mineral water as well as other beverages. Its headquarters are in the city of Karlovy Vary. The company has operations and markets its products in a number of European countries, including Slovakia, Austria, Hungary, Bulgaria, Serbia, Bosnia and Herzegovina, and Montenegro. It is the largest producer of soft drinks in Central Europe.

== History ==
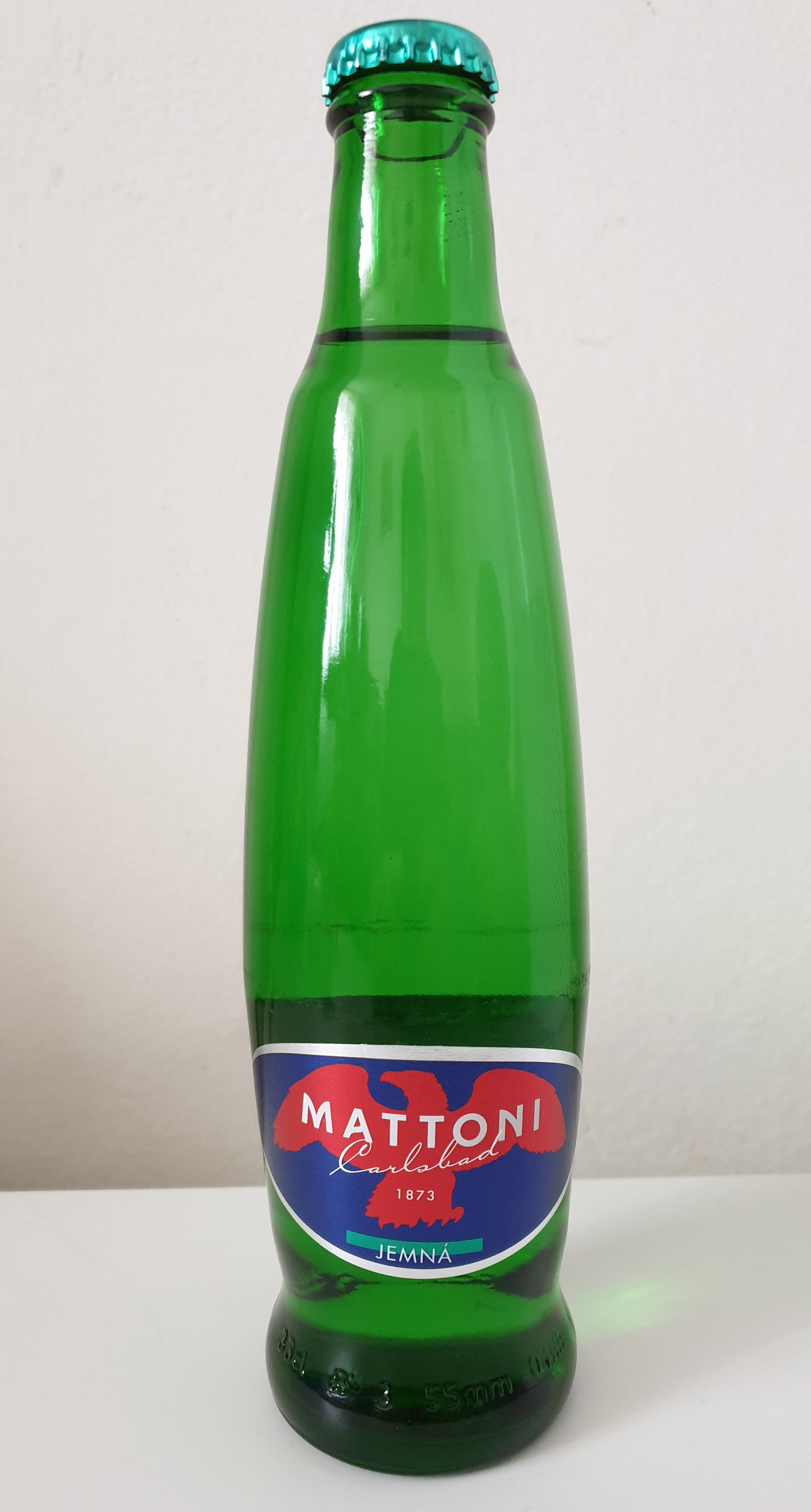
A bottle of Mattoni mineral water

In 1867, Heinrich Mattoni (1830–1910), an Italian-Czech native of Karlovy Vary, began bottling mineral water abundant to the region and selling it. In 1873, he took over mineral water production at the small spa town of Kyselka, in the Karlovy Vary Region of Bohemia. Mattoni expanded the operation by building a modern bottling plant and establishing distribution infrastructure to supply his product to spa guests in Kyselka and throughout the region. In the 1880s, the Mattoni brand ranked among the best known in Europe. In 1910, they exported ten million bottles to other countries.

Since 1994, the company belongs to the Italian business family Pasquale.

== Brands ==
By 2023, the company sold 56 brands of drinks and snacks, including its flagship Mattoni brand of mineral and flavoured waters, as well as the brands Aquila, Magnesia, Poděbradka, Dobrá voda, and Hanácká kyselka. The company's portfolio also includes the Hungarian Szentkirályi and Theodora mineral waters, the Austrian Waldquelle, and the Serbian Knjaz Miloš.

Since 2018, Mattoni holds an exclusive license to produce and distribute PepsiCo beverages in the Czech Republic, Slovakia, Bulgaria, Austria, Hungary, and Serbia.
