= Kyselka =

Municipality in the Karlovy Vary Region, Czech Republic

- Municipality
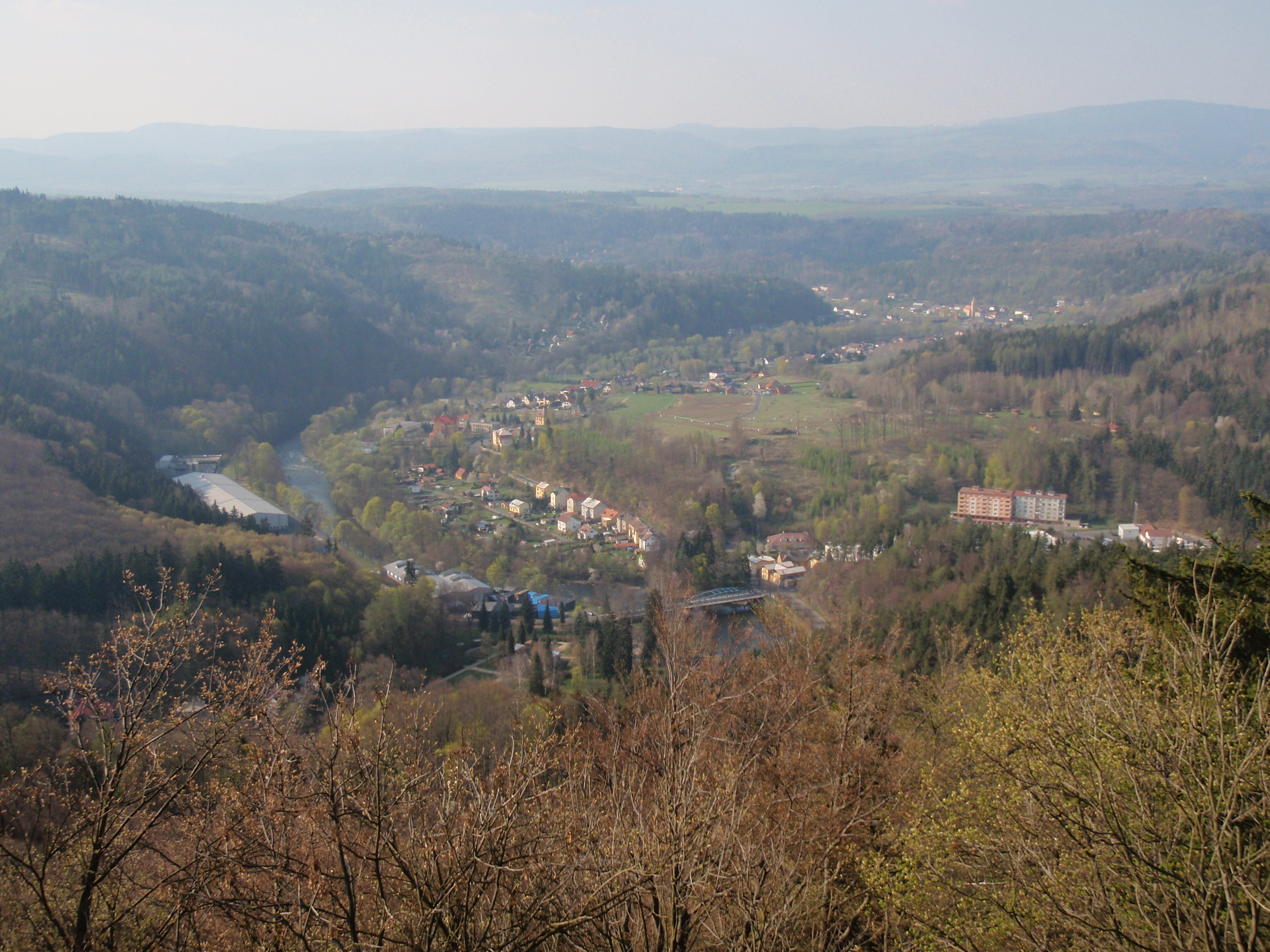
- Panorama of Kyselka

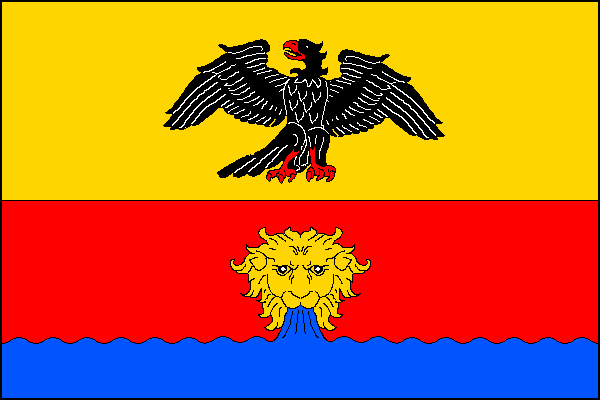
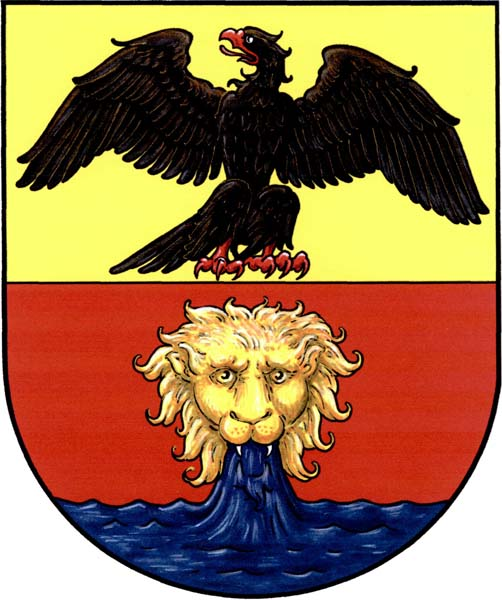
- Flag Coat of arms

- Location in the Czech Republic
- Coordinates: 50°15′32″N 13°0′1″E
- Country: Czech Republic
- Region: Karlovy Vary
- District: Karlovy Vary
- First mentioned: 1867

Area
  - Total: 6.52 km^{2} (2.52 sq mi)
- Elevation: 358 m (1,175 ft)

Population (2026-01-01)
  - Total: 820
  - Density: 130/km^{2} (330/sq mi)
- Time zone: UTC+1 (CET)
  - Summer (DST): UTC+2 (CEST)
- Postal code: 362 72
- Website: www.obeckyselka.cz

Kyselka (until 1950 Kysibl Kyselka; German: Gießhübl-Sauerbrunn) is a municipality and village in Karlovy Vary District in the Karlovy Vary Region of the Czech Republic. It has about 800 inhabitants. It is known for its former spa called Kyselka Spa.

== Administrative division ==
Kyselka consists of three municipal parts (in brackets population according to the 2021 census):

- Kyselka (28)
- Nová Kyselka (50)
- Radošov (715)

== Demographics ==
Historical population
Year	Pop.	±%
1869	501	—
1880	600	+19.8%
1890	740	+23.3%
1900	918	+24.1%
1910	1,001	+9.0%
1921	966	−3.5%
1930	1,257	+30.1%
1950	422	−66.4%
1961	637	+50.9%
1970	572	−10.2%
1980	668	+16.8%
1991	624	−6.6%
2001	687	+10.1%
2011	759	+10.5%
2021	793	+4.5%
Source: Censuses
