= Nordart =

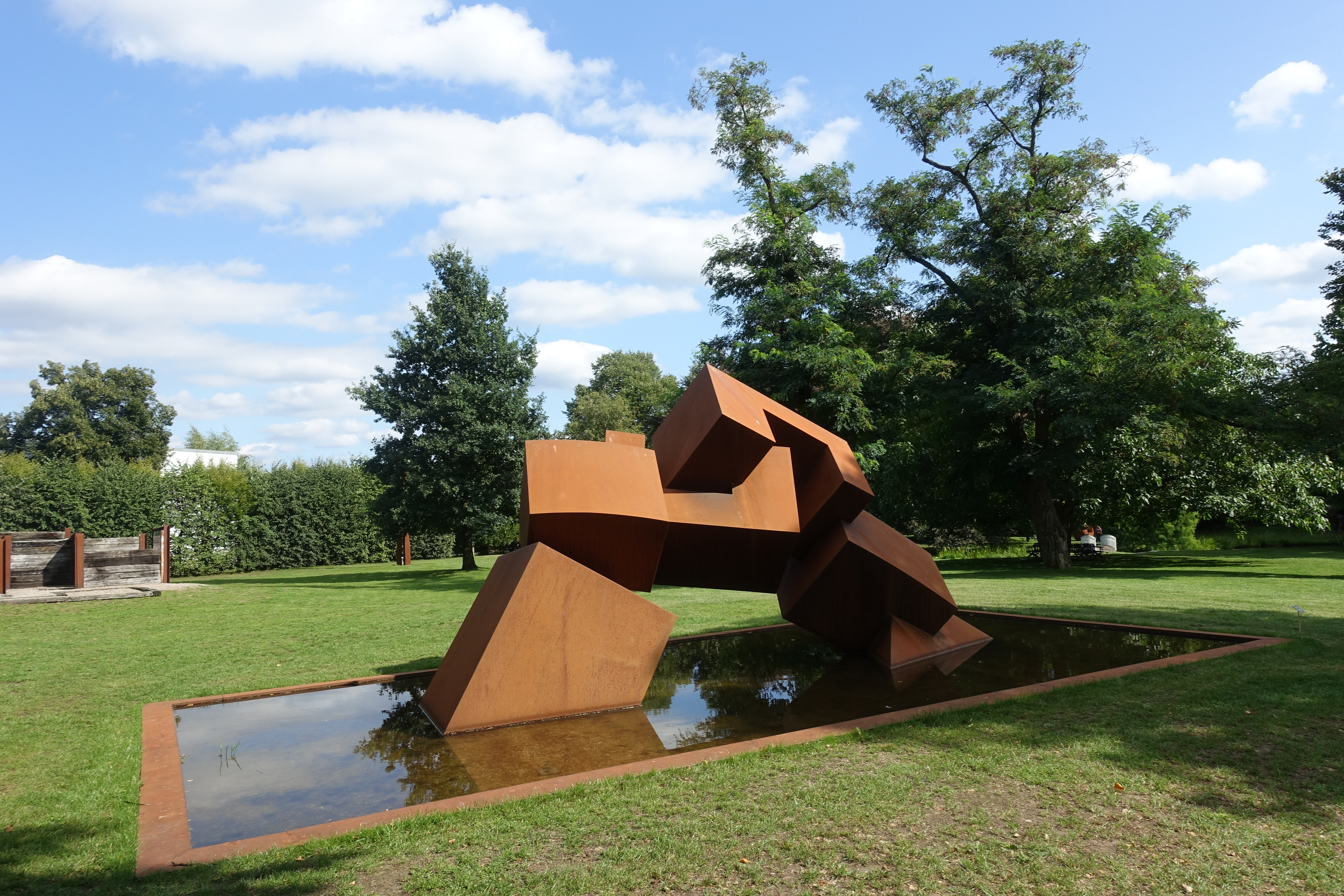
Sculpture at NordArt

NordArt is an international contemporary art exhibition and a non-profit cultural initiative of the ACO Group and the cities of Büdelsdorf and Rendsburg. It has taken place annually in the summer since 1999 at Carlshütte, a former iron foundry. The site features 22,000 m² of interior space and 60,000 m² for outdoor installations.

== NordArt Prizes ==
In 2010, NordArt began awarding the NordArt Prize and the NordArt Public Choice Award. All award recipients are invited to participate again in NordArt the year after their win.

=== The NordArt Prize ===
Sponsored by Johanna and Hans-Julius Ahlmann, the NordArt Prize is awarded each year to one artist. The artist selected receives an endowment of 10,000 euros.

Previous NordArt Prize Winners

- 2010: Zeng Chenggang (China)
- 2011: Peter Lundberg (USA)
- 2012: Gheorghi Filin (Bulgaria / Italy)
- 2013: SINN (South Korea) and Wolfgang Gramm (Germany)
- 2014: AES+F (Tatiana Arzamasova, Lev Evzovitch, Evgeny Svyatsky + Vladimir Fridkes) (Russia)
- 2015: Liu Yonggang (China)
- 2017: Jörg Plickat (Germany)
- 2018: Michal Gabriel (Czech Republic)

=== The NordArt Public Choice Award ===
The Public Choice Award is based upon votes from NordArt visitors. A prize of 1,000 euros is awarded to the top three artists.

Previous Audience Award Winners

2010

- 1st place - Teija and Pekka Isorättyä (Finland)
- 2nd place - Wolfgang Stiller (Berlin)
- 3rd place - Hiroko

2011

- 1st place - Dan Hudson (Canada)
- 2nd place - Gerhard Mantz (Germany)
- 3rd place - Zdeněk Šmíd (Czech Republic)

2012

- 1st place - Gilles T. Lacombe (France)
- 2nd place - Zhi XinXin (China)
- 3rd place - SINN (Korea)

2013

- 1st place - Jovanka Stanojević (Serbia)
- 2nd place - Villu Jaanisoo (Estonia / Finland)
- 3rd place - Soon Mi Oh (South Korea)

2014

- 1st Prize - Confronting Anitya - China Garden (China)
- 2nd Prize - Jovanka Stanojević (Serbia)
- 3rd prize - Dmitry Gutov (Russia)

2015

- 1st place - Jang Yongsun (South Korea)
- 2nd place - Lv Shun (China)
- 3rd place - Ochirbold Ayurzana (Mongolia)

2016

- 1st prize - Liu Ruowang (China)
- 2nd Prize - Talia Keinan (Israel)
- 3rd Prize - Jo Kley (Germany)

2017

- 1st place - Xu Bing (China)
- 2nd place - Varol Topaç (Turkey)
- 3rd place - David Černý (Czech Republic)

2018

- 1st Prize - Xiang Jing (China)
- 2nd Prize - Zhang Dali (China)
- 3rd Prize - Ekaterina Zacharova (Russia)
