= Mill Colonnade =

Colonnade in Karlovy Vary, Czechia

Coordinates: 50°13′31″N 12°52′55″E

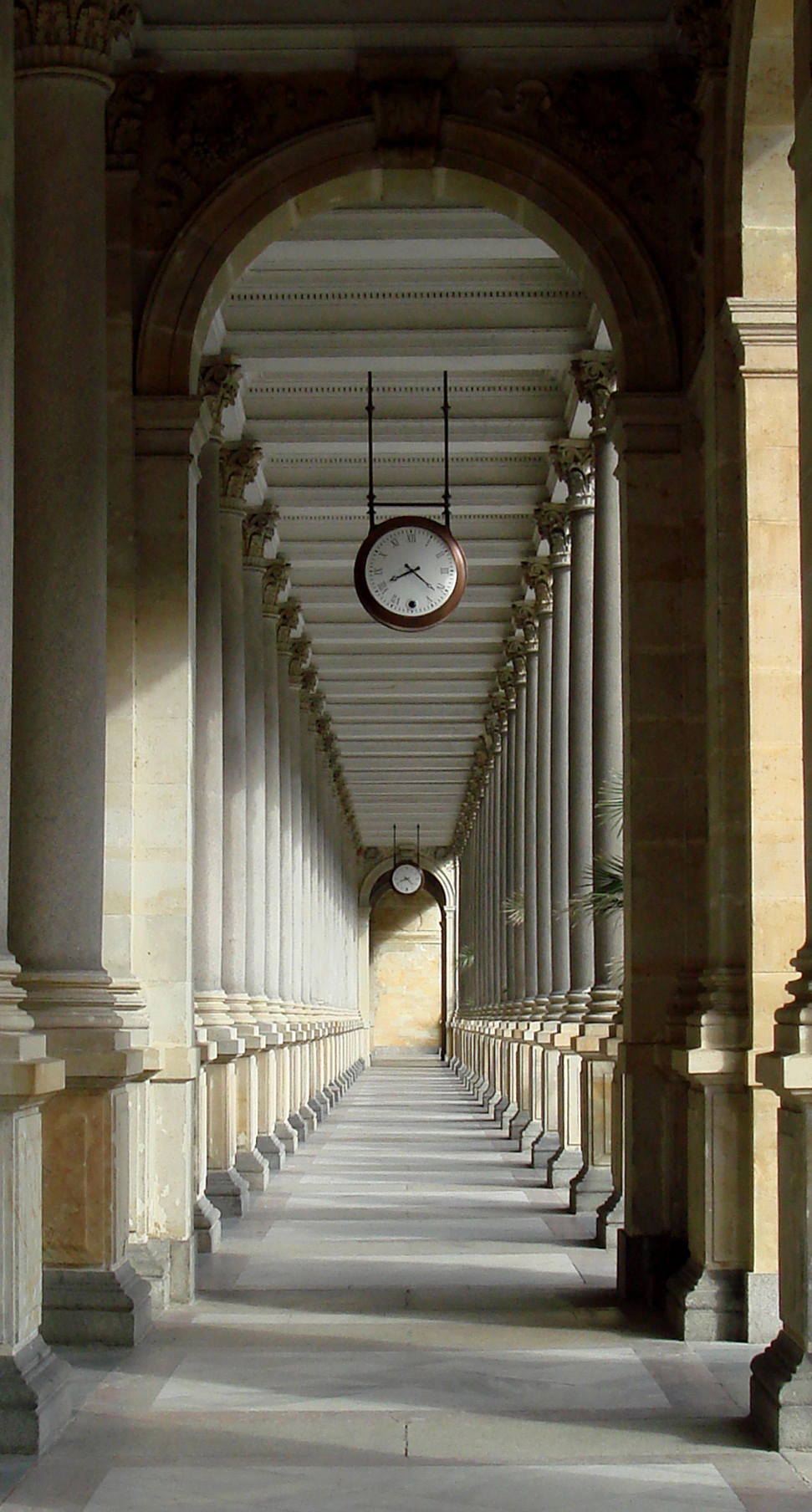
The Mill Colonnade is supported by 124 columns.

The Mill Colonnade (Czech: Mlýnská kolonáda) is a large colonnade containing several hot springs in the spa town of Karlovy Vary, Czech Republic. The structure is one of the traditional symbols of the town.

== Design and reception ==
The Neo-Renaissance structure has a nave, two aisles and measures 132 m (433 ft) long by 13 m (43 ft) wide. There are 124 Corinthian columns. Twelve statues representing the twelve months of the year sit above the portico. There is a raised orchestra space for the spa orchestra which plays regular, free concerts.

Architect Josef Zítek, who also designed the National Theatre and Rudolfinum in Prague, designed the structure, which was built between 1871-1881. The original design called for a two level colonnade, but a lack of funds restricted it to one level. Construction proceeded very slowly and costs grew higher. The structure was initially reviled by critics and compared to a bed of carrots or a bowling alley; at the time it was finished, many believed it had blemished the center of town.

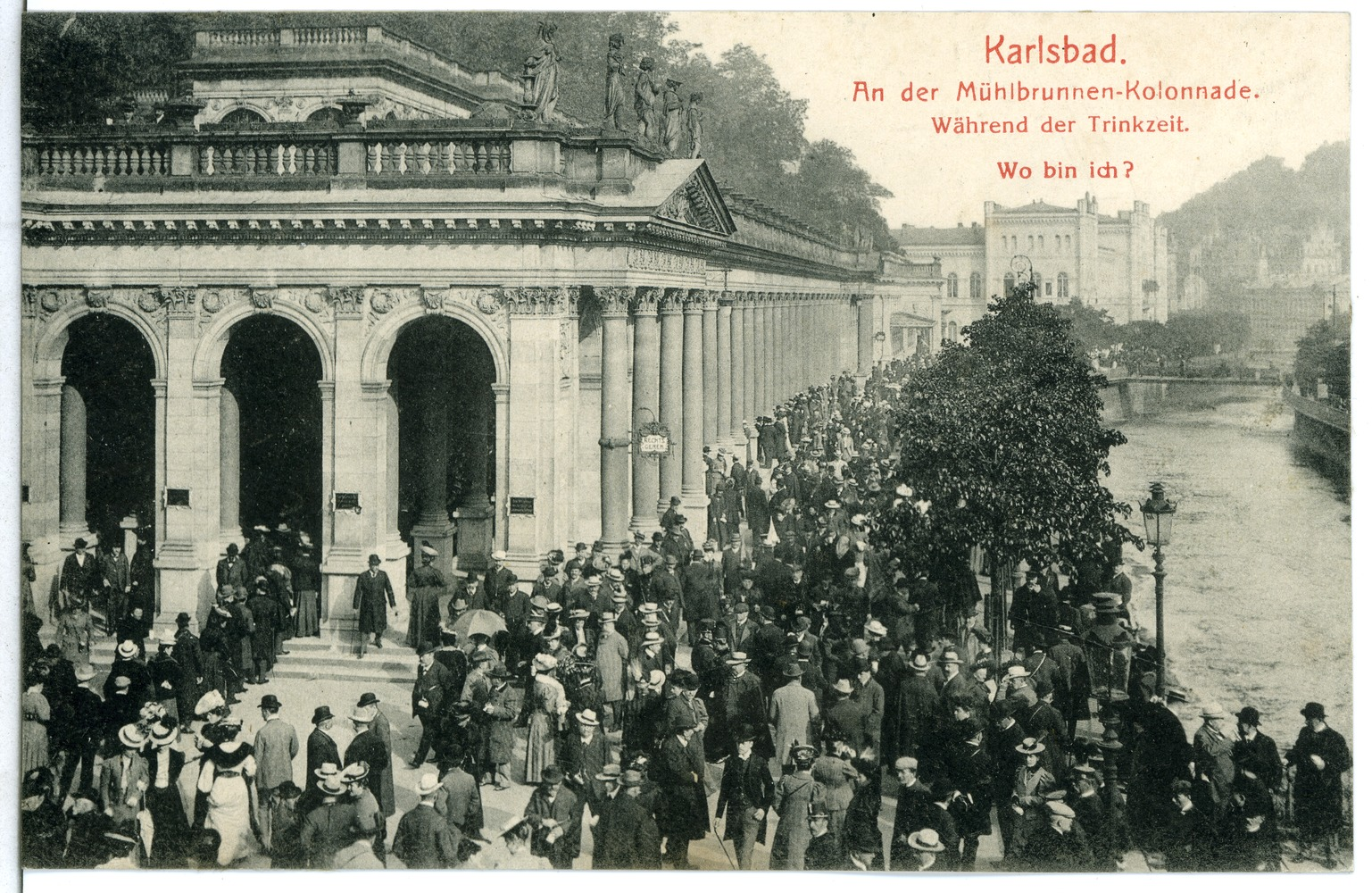
Mill Colonnade in 1909

The Mill Colonnade was extended in 1893 to include the Rock Spring. By 1949, the adjacent portion of the Tepla River was bridged over in front of the Mill Colonnade, creating a plaza.

The structure was restored in 1982, and stone reliefs portraying historic moments in Karlovy Vary history were added to the orchestra space in 1995-1996.

== Springs ==
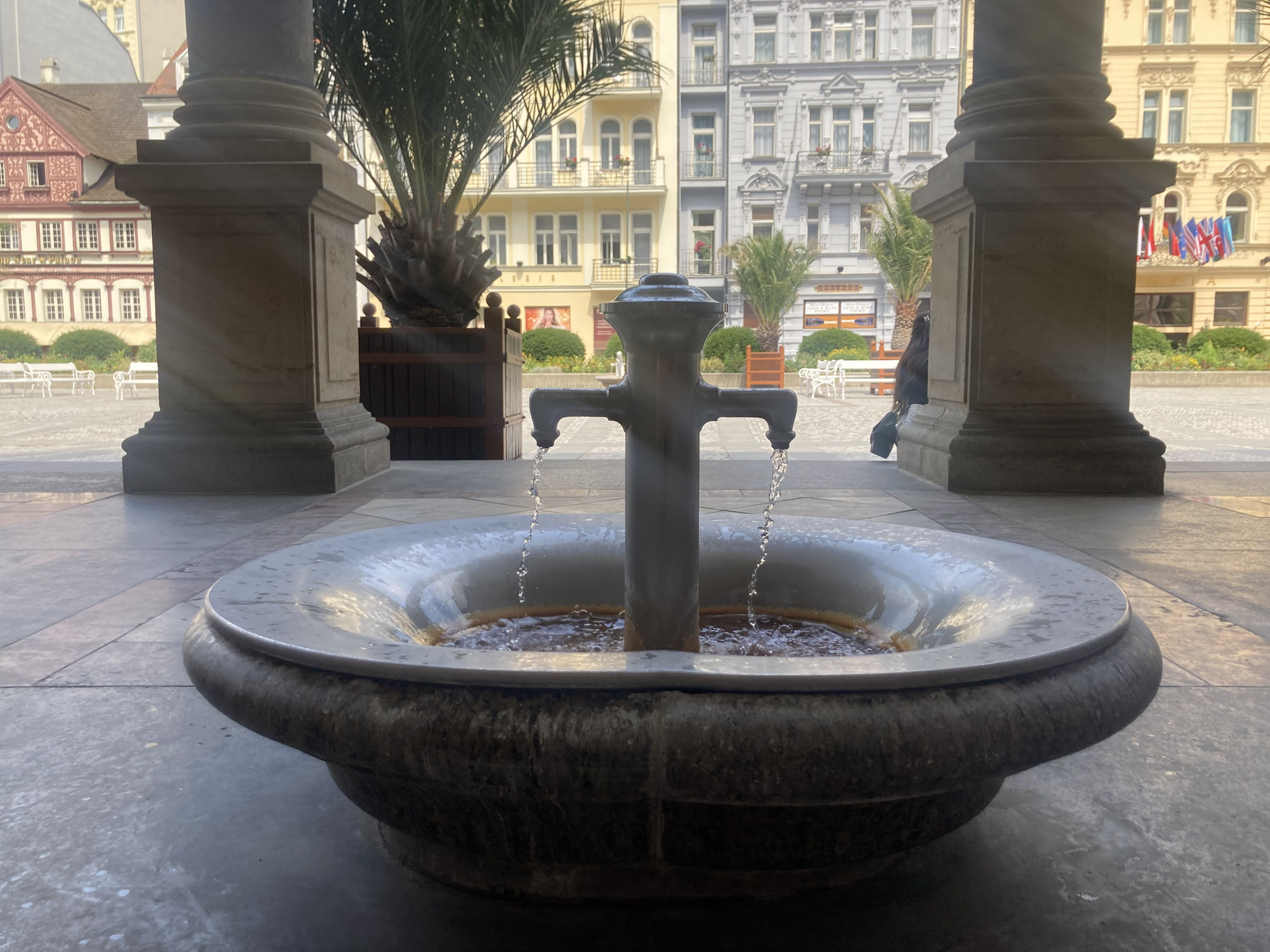
Spring within Mill Colonnade

Karlovy Vary has 13 major springs and the Mill Colonnade covers five of them, ranging in temperature and history:

- Mill Spring (Czech: Mlýnský pramen), 56 °C (133 °F), used for therapeutic purposes since the 16th century, was historically one of the more popular springs, and its waters were at one time sold at stores in the region. The spring was named after an old mill which used to stand in the area.
- Rock Spring (Czech: Skalní pramen), 53 °C (127 °F), originally rose next to the nearby Tepla River; in 1845 the spring was diverted to the current location of the Mill Colonnade.
- Libuše Spring, 62 °C (144 °F), is a merger of four smaller springs, and was originally named the "Spring of Elizabeth's Roses".
- Nymph Spring (Czech: Rusalčin pramen), 60 °C (140 °F), was known prior to 1945 as the "New Spring" and had its own colonnade before the Mill Colonnade replaced it.
- Prince Václav I Spring, 65 °C (149 °F), was originally one of the strongest springs in the area in both yield and force, and was used to produce curative salt. A second spring, Prince Václav II Spring, 58 °C (136 °F), comes from the same source and flows out several meters in front of the Mill Colonnade.

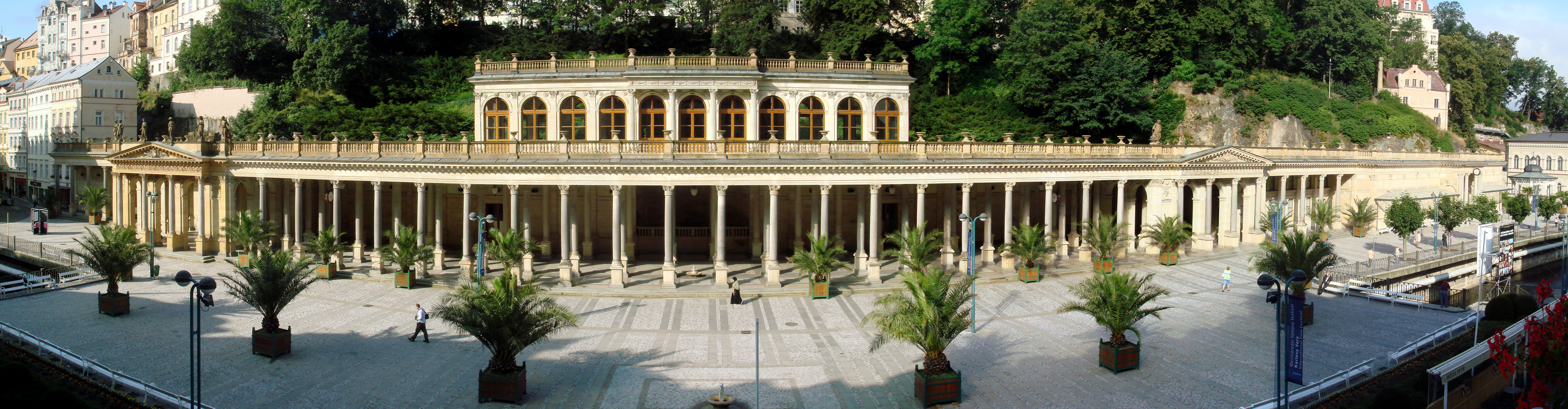
Mill Colonnade
