= Goethe's Lookout =

Monument in the Czech Republic

Goethe's Lookout Goethova vyhlídka
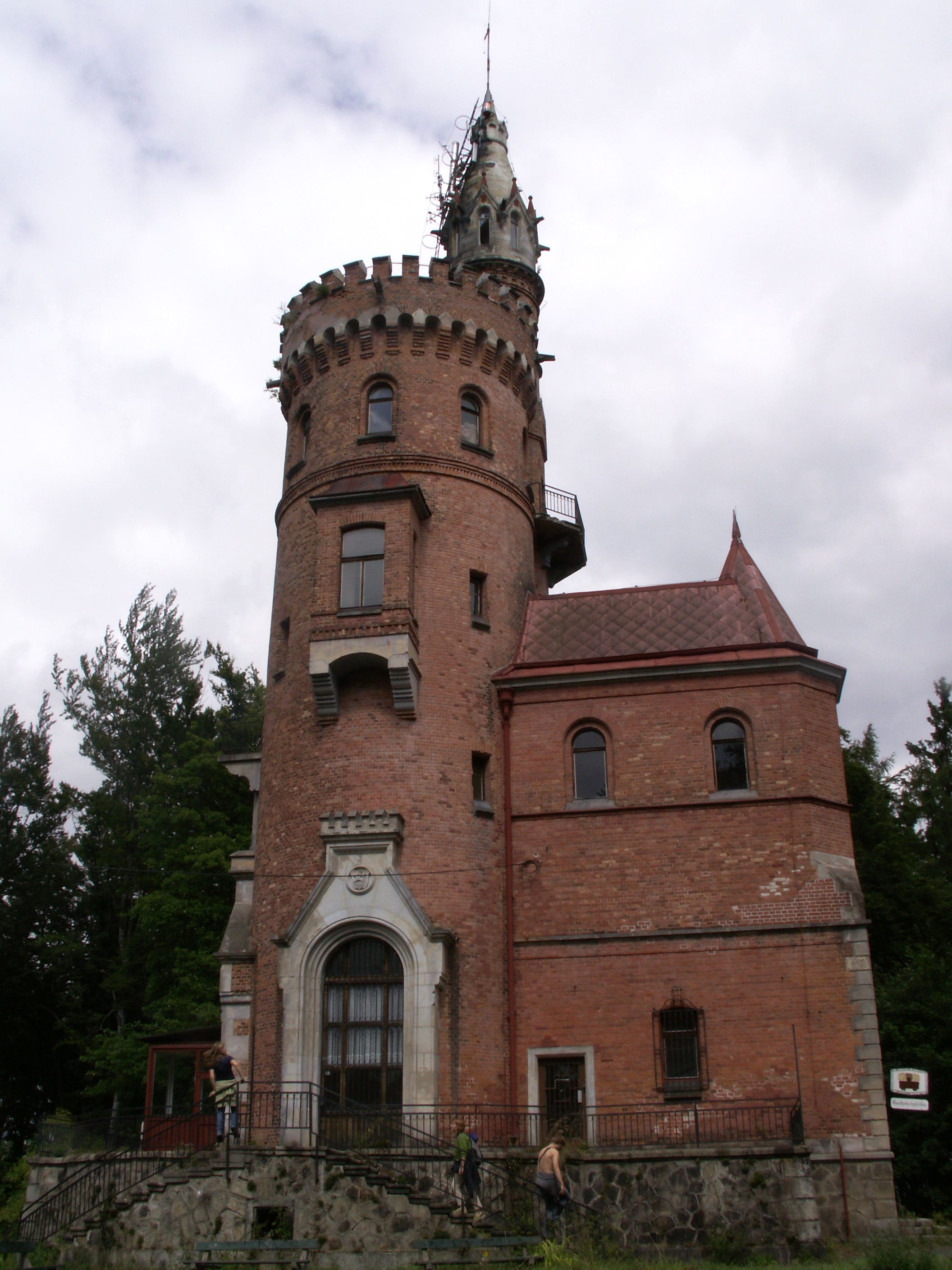
- Goethe's Lookout in 2008
- Interactive map of the Goethe's Lookout; Goethova vyhlídka area

General information
- Architectural style: Neo-Gothic
- Location: Karlovy Vary, Czech Republic
- Coordinates: 50°13′26″N 12°54′12″E
- Completed: Late 19th century
- Inaugurated: 21 July 1889
- Client: Princess Stéphanie of Belgium

Design and construction
- Architects: Ferdinand Fellner and Hermann Helmer

Goethe's Lookout (Czech: Goethova vyhlídka) is a tower located in Karlovy Vary in the Czech Republic. It is considered an architectural folly and was built in the late 19th century.

== History ==
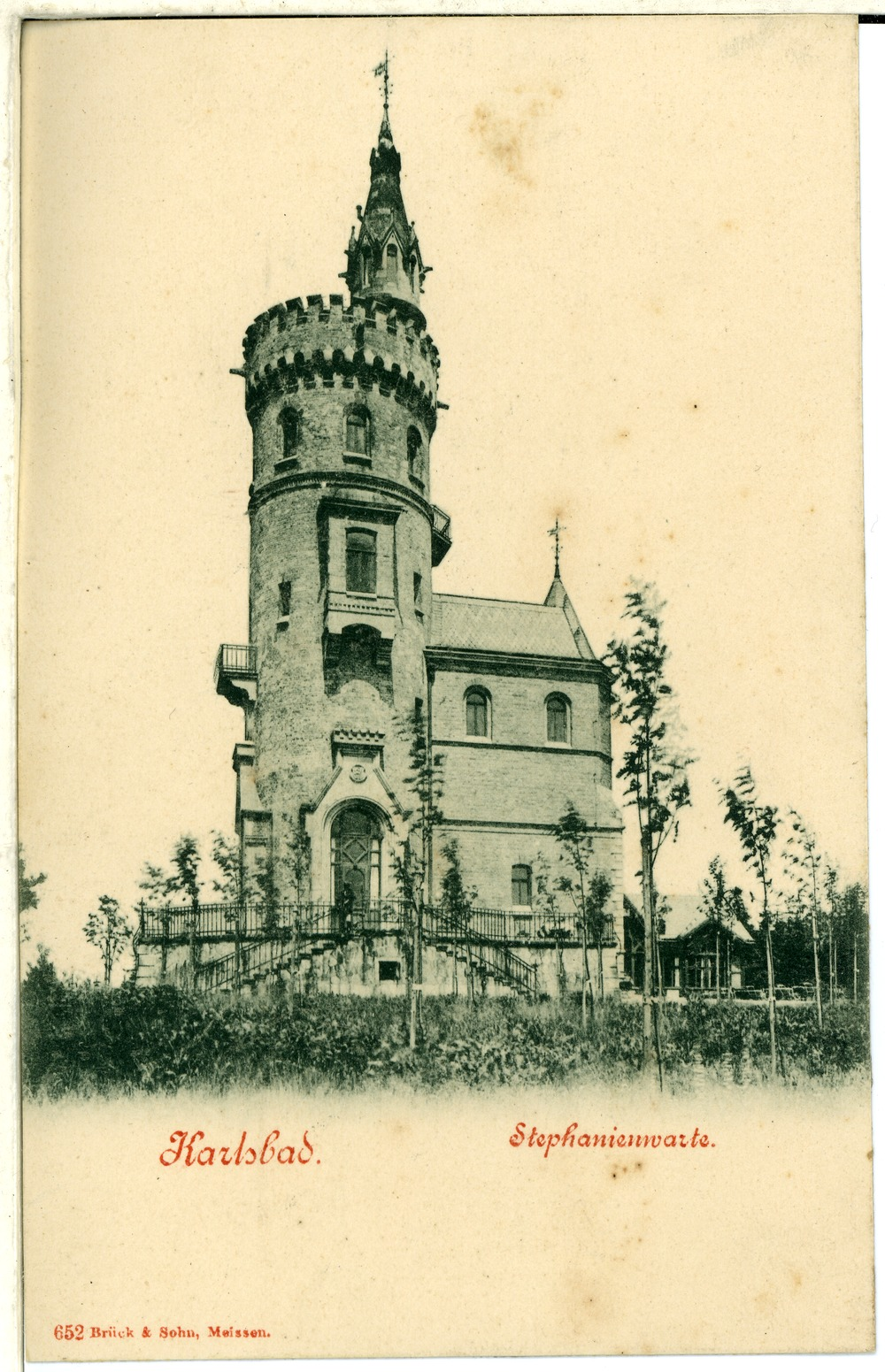
Goethe's Lookout in the late 19th-century

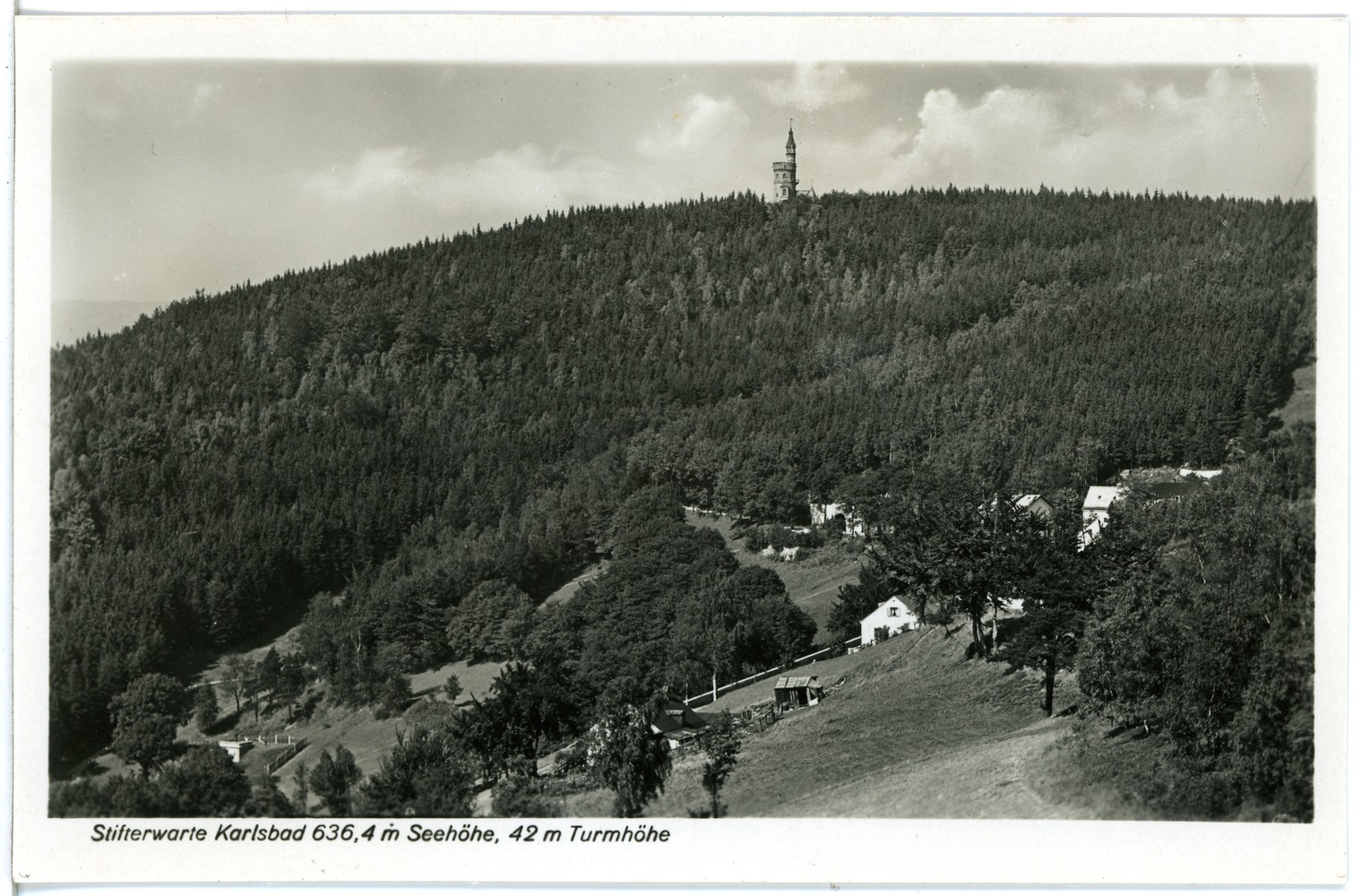
The tower in the early 1930s

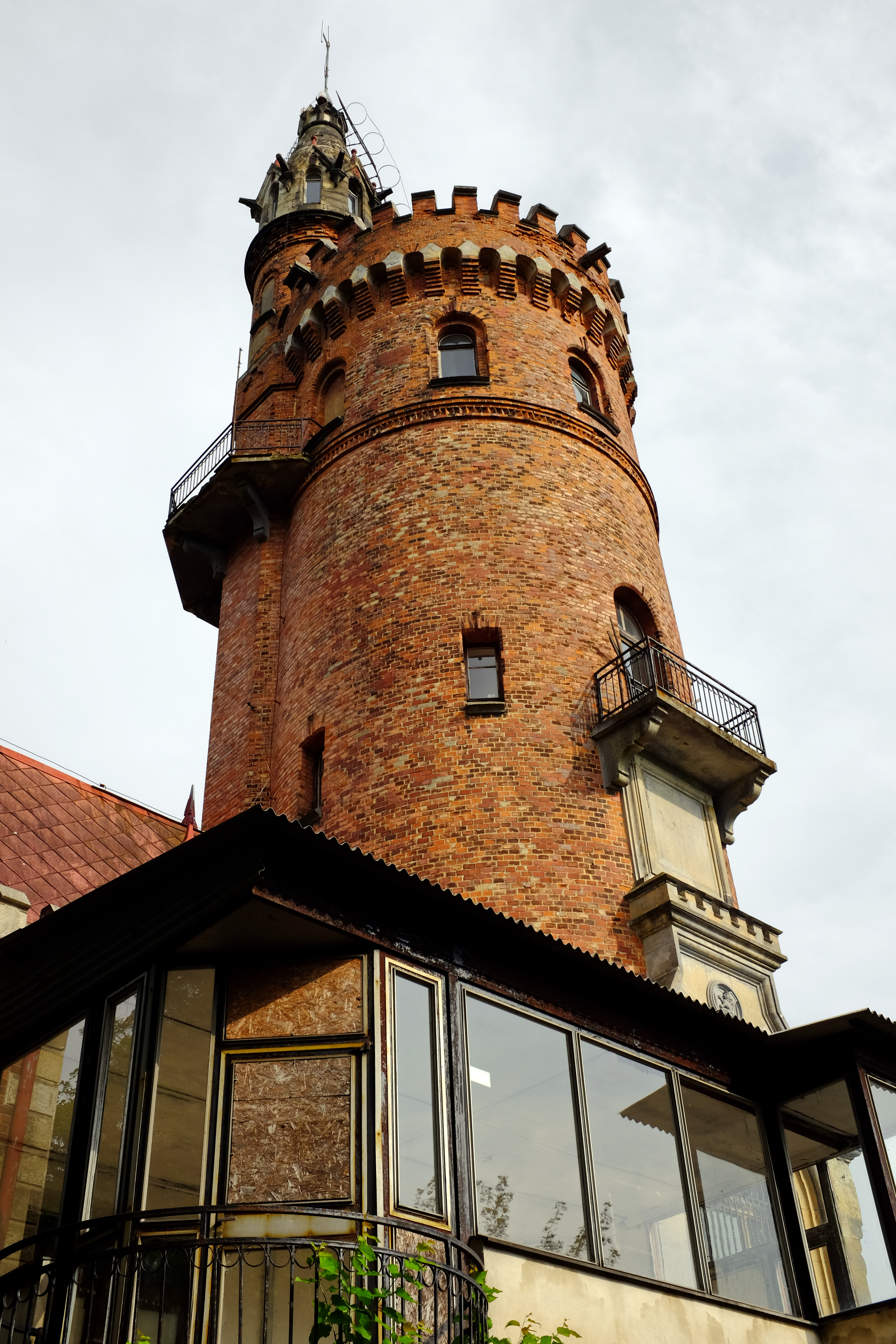
Recent detail

The observation tower was built between 1888 and 1889 after Princess Stéphanie of Belgium, during a walk on the hill, expressed support for erecting a tower on the site as it was deemed suitable. Eduard Knoll, then mayor of the city, took the opportunity to follow through with the idea, which had already been expressed by the German poet Johann Wolfgang von Goethe. The necessary design work was entrusted to architects Ferdinand Fellner and Hermann Helmer, and following the completion of construction, the opening ceremony of the building, then called the Princess Stephanie's Belvedere, took place on 21 July 1889. The site quickly became a popular destination for guests of the nearby spas, but the path was quite long and uphill, leading to plans for constructing a funicular to connect the hilltop with the spa center. Preparatory work began but was interrupted by the outbreak of World War I. In 2018, the building underwent significant restoration and was subsequently reopened to the public.

=== Origin of the name ===
The tower was originally called Kronprinzessin-Stephanie-Warte or Princess Stephanie's Belvedere. After World War I, in honor of the writer Adalbert Stifter, the tower was renamed Stifter-Warte. Shortly after the end of World War II, it was called Stalinova rozhledna (or Stalin's Tower). During destalinization, this name was also abandoned, and in 1957, the current name was chosen, dedicating the building to Johann Wolfgang von Goethe, who had visited the Karlsbad spa several times for treatment.

== Description ==
Goethe's Lookout is situated in an elevated position east of the city centre of Karlovy Vary in the Czech Republic. The building is in the neogothic style, featuring exposed brickwork. The cylindrical main structure with a bay window on the rocks above the main entrance with a crenellated portico is flanked by a tall, slender tower and two rectangular prismatic buildings with reinforced corners. The structure includes an observation tower and a dining room and is characterized by romantic and neogothic style elements. The location is 639 meters above sea level. Extensive modifications were made to the building in the late 1960s, which did not substantially alter the original architecture.

=== Protection ===
The Czech Republic's heritage conservation authorities protects Goethe's Lookout as a cultural monument with catalog number 1000125882. The building is on the list of unsellable properties in the city of Karlovy Vary and was valued at 5.5 million CZK in a 1995 estimate.

== Bibliography ==
- Lubomír Zeman (2017). Městečka na dlani: Karlovarský kraj: Bečov nad Teplou, Boží Dar, Horní Blatná, Chyše, Krásno, Přebuz, Valeč (in Czech). Prague: Foibos Books. OCLC 833406206.
