= Grandhotel Pupp =

Luxury hotel in the Czech Republic

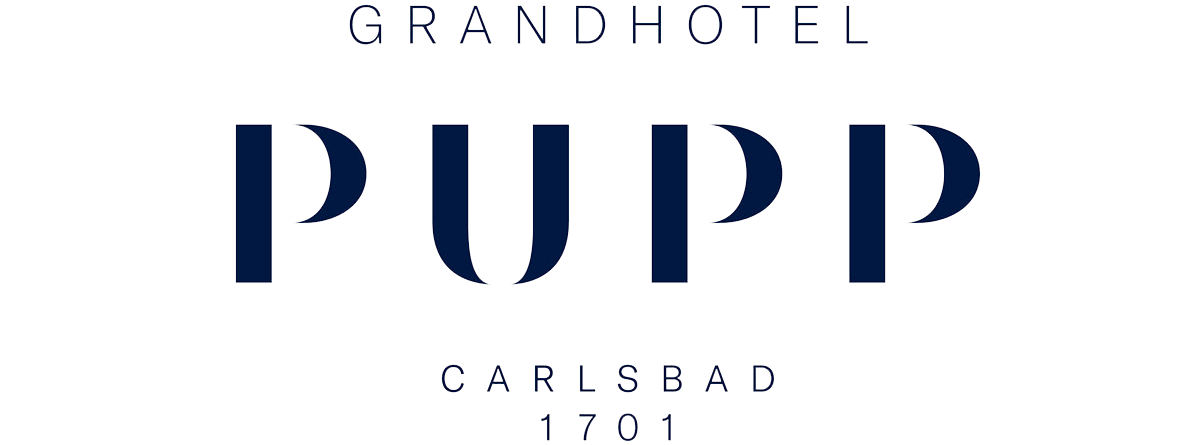

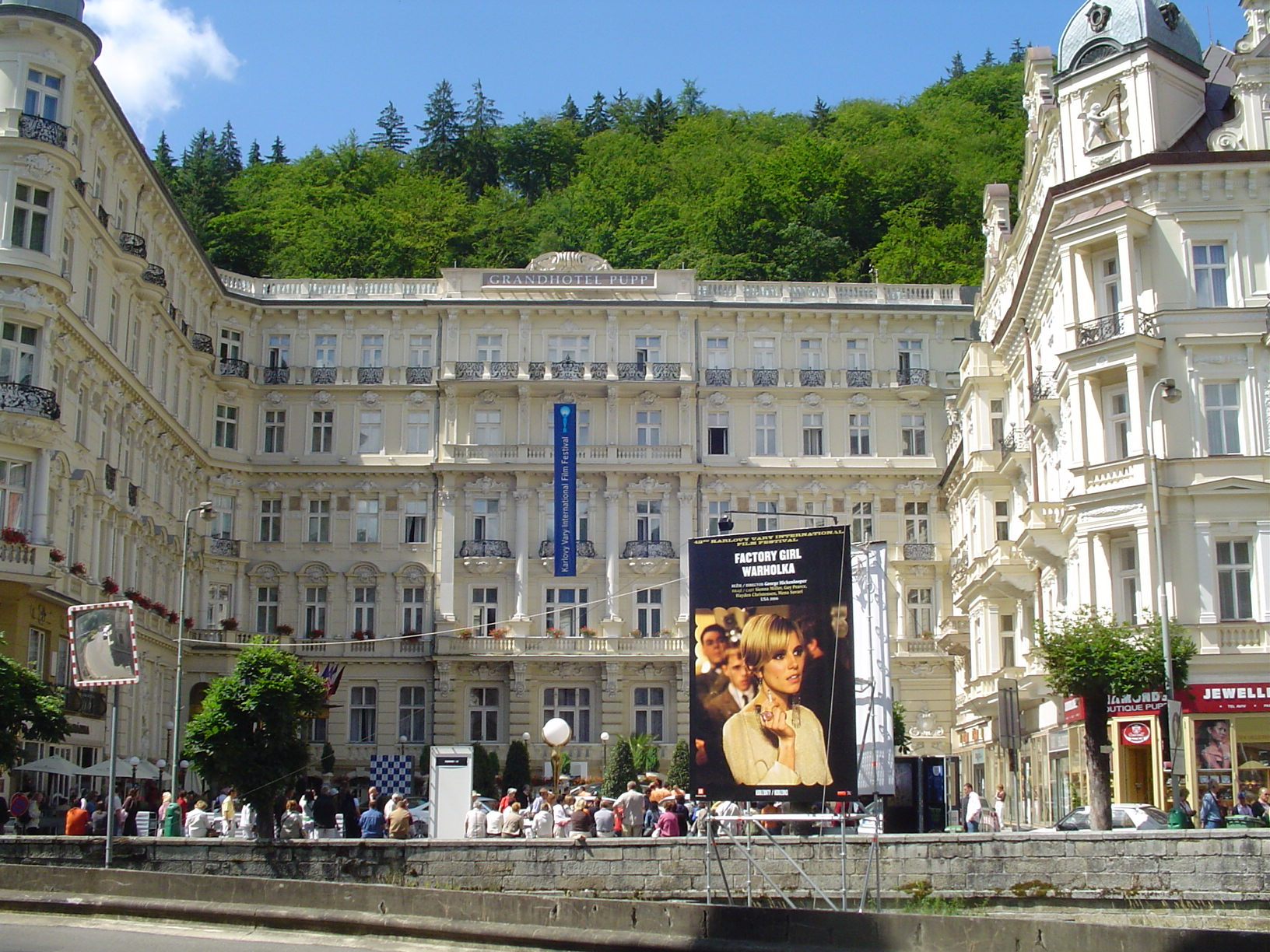
- Grandhotel Pupp during the film festival
- Interactive map of the Grandhotel Pupp area

General information
- Location: Mírové náměstí 2, Karlovy Vary, Czech Republic
- Coordinates: 50.2194444°N 12.8788889°E
- Opening: 1701

Design and construction
- Developer: Jan Jiří Pop

Other information
- Number of rooms: 228

Website
- www.pupp.cz

The Grandhotel Pupp (Czech pronunciation: [pup]) is a 228-room luxury hotel in Karlovy Vary, Czech Republic. The hotel hosts the annual Karlovy Vary International Film Festival.

== History ==
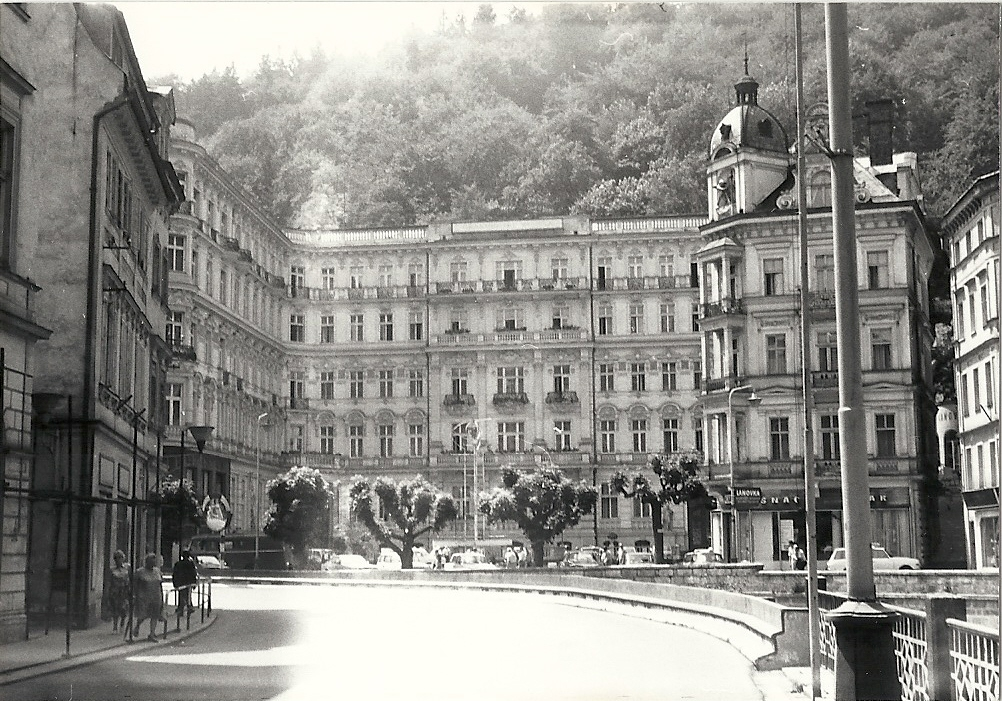
The hotel in 1977

The hotel began as the Saxony Hall, built in 1701 by Burgomaster Deiml. A later mayor, Becher, built a Lusthaus on a plot of land he owned at right-angles to the Saxony Hall. This became known as the Bohemia Hall. Jan Jiří Pop (German: Johann Georg Pupp), a confectioner, came to Karlovy Vary (that time known under its German name Karlsbad) in 1760 and worked for a local confectioner called Mitterbach. The widow of former mayor Becher sold a one-third share in the Bohemia Hall to Mitterbach's daughter, who married Pop in 1775. The following year, she bought another third and her husband the remaining third, giving the Pop/Pupp family complete ownership of the hall. At that time, Jan Jiří Pop started to use the German variant of his name.

The family prospered in the following decades and was able to buy the Saxony Hall in 1890. Between 1896 and 1907, the Viennese architects Fellner & Helmer rebuilt the various family-owned buildings into the neo-Baroque Grandhotel Pupp that stands today. Up until World War II the family continued to acquire neighbouring properties and incorporate them into the hotel complex.

After the war, the Edvard Beneš government of Czechoslovakia nationalized the hotel and it was renamed Grandhotel Moskva in 1950. The hotel's owners, along with almost the totality of the Karlovy Vary's population, were expelled. The hotel's original name was restored in 1989 and it has since been privatized.

== In popular culture ==
The Grandhotel Pupp was a major location for the 2006 movie Last Holiday starring Queen Latifah. It also appears in the 2006 James Bond film Casino Royale as Hotel Splendide in Montenegro. It has been cited as inspiration for the Grand Budapest Hotel in the movie of the same name.
