= Karlovy Vary =

Statutory city in the Czech Republic

Karlovy Vary Karlsbad
- Statutory city
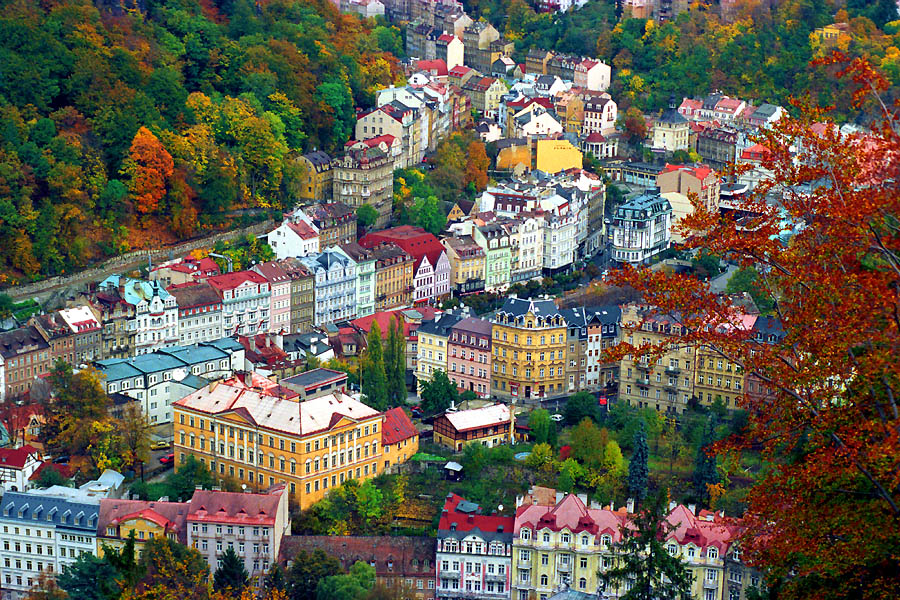
- Aerial view of Karlovy Vary

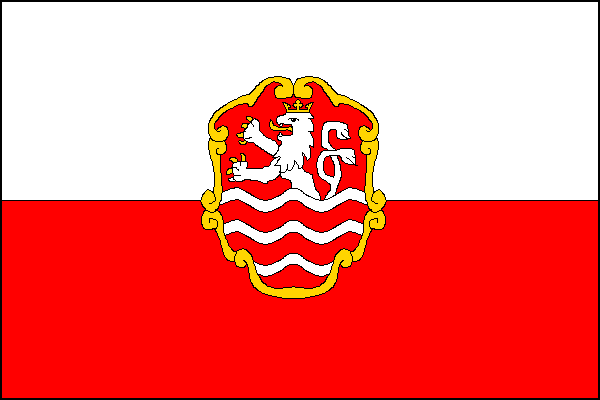
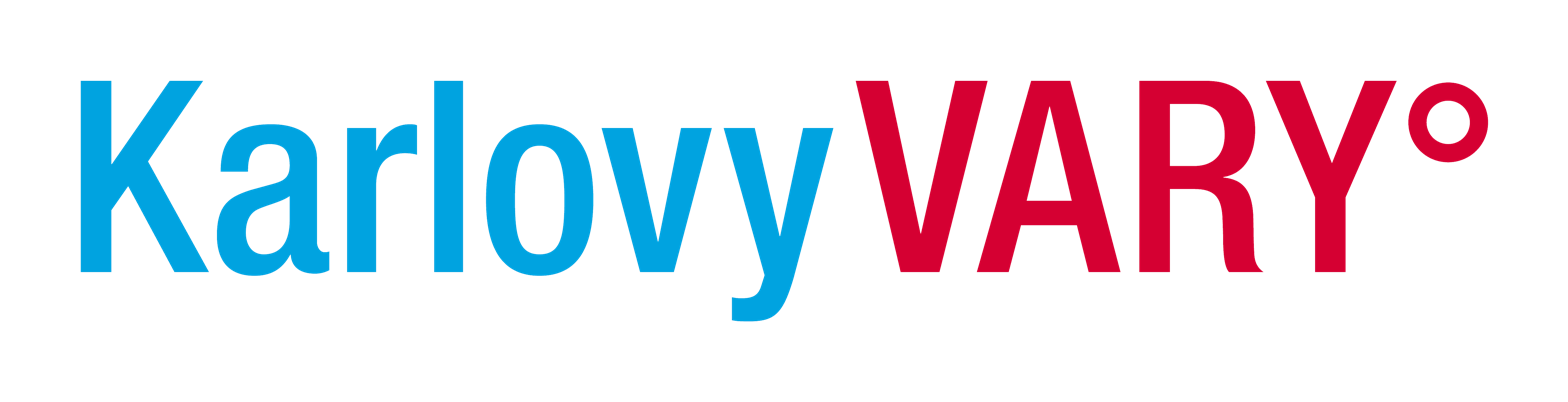
- Flag Coat of arms Wordmark

- Location in the Czech Republic
- Coordinates: 50°13′50″N 12°52′21″E
- Country: Czech Republic
- Region: Karlovy Vary
- District: Karlovy Vary
- Founded around: 1349

Government
  - Mayor: Andrea Pfeffer Ferklová (ANO 2011)

Area
  - Total: 59.08 km^{2} (22.81 sq mi)
- Elevation: 447 m (1,467 ft)

Population (2026-01-01)
  - Total: 48,788
  - Density: 825.8/km^{2} (2,139/sq mi)
- Time zone: UTC+1 (CET)
  - Summer (DST): UTC+2 (CEST)
- Postal codes: 360 01, 360 06, 360 07, 360 17, 360 18, 364 64
- Website: mmkv.cz

UNESCO World Heritage Site
- Part of: The Great Spa Towns of Europe
- Criteria: Cultural: (ii)(iii)
- Reference: 1613
- Inscription: 2021 (44th Session)

Karlovy Vary (Czech pronunciation: [ˈkarlovɪ ˈvarɪ]; German: Karlsbad, formerly also spelled Carlsbad in English) is a spa city in the Karlovy Vary Region of the Czech Republic. It has about 49,000 inhabitants. It is located at the confluence of the Ohře and Teplá rivers.

Karlovy Vary is named after Charles IV, Holy Roman Emperor and the King of Bohemia, who founded the city in the 14th century. The site of numerous hot springs, the city grew into a spa resort in the 19th century and was a popular destination for the European aristocracy and other luminaries. Karlovy Vary's rapid growth was brought to an end by the outbreak of World War I. After the Velvet Revolution in 1989, Karlovy Vary once again became a major tourist destination.

Karlovy Vary is the most visited spa town in the Czech Republic. It is also known for the Karlovy Vary International Film Festival, which is among the leading film events of Europe. In 2021, the city became part of the transnational UNESCO World Heritage Site under the name "Great Spa Towns of Europe" because of its spas and architecture from the 18th through 20th centuries. The historic city centre with the spa cultural landscape is well preserved and is protected as an urban monument reservation.

== Administrative division ==
Karlovy Vary consists of 15 municipal parts (in brackets population according to the 2021 census):

- Karlovy Vary (11,539)
- Bohatice (2,317)
- Čankov (110)
- Cihelny (16)
- Doubí (2,049)
- Drahovice (6,796)
- Dvory (1,884)
- Hůrky (304)
- Olšová Vrata (379)
- Počerny (325)
- Rosnice (185)
- Rybáře (9,204)
- Sedlec (570)
- Stará Role (7,614)
- Tašovice (1,031)

Cihelny forms an exclave of the municipal territory.

== Etymology ==
The city is named after its founder Charles IV. The name Karlovy Vary (as well as the German exonym Karlsbad) means "Charles' Baths". The city was also colloquially called Warmbad (German for 'hot bath').

== Geography ==
Karlovy Vary is located about 106 kilometres (66 mi) west of Prague. The northern part of the municipal territory with most of the built-up area lies in a relatively flat landscape of the Sokolov Basin. The southern part, including the valley of the Teplá River, lies in a hilly landscape of the Slavkov Forest and in the eponymous protected landscape area. The highest point is the hill Vítkův vrch at 642 m (2,106 ft) above sea level.

The city lies at the confluence of the Ohře (which flows across the city) with the Teplá and Rolava rivers. There are several small bodies of water in the northern half of the Karlovy Vary territory. The most notable is the natural reservoir Rolava, which is located right in the centre of the city. It is used for recreational purposes.

=== Climate ===
Karlovy Vary's climate is classified as humid continental climate (Köppen: Dfb; Trewartha: Dclo). Among them, the annual average temperature is 7.4 °C (45.3 °F), the hottest month in July is 17.2 °C (63.0 °F), and the coldest month is −1.8 °C (28.8 °F) in January. The annual precipitation is 568.4 millimetres (22.38 in), of which June is the wettest with 71.1 millimetres (2.80 in), while February is the driest with only 27.8 millimetres (1.09 in). The extreme temperature throughout the year ranged from −25.1 °C (−13.2 °F) on 21 December 1969 to 35.8 °C (96.4 °F) on 27 July 1983 and 20 August 2012.

Climate data for Karlovy Vary (1991−2020 normals, extremes 1961-present)
Month	Jan	Feb	Mar	Apr	May	Jun	Jul	Aug	Sep	Oct	Nov	Dec	Year
Record high °C (°F)	14.2 (57.6)	16.4 (61.5)	21.8 (71.2)	27.7 (81.9)	31.0 (87.8)	34.5 (94.1)	35.8 (96.4)	35.8 (96.4)	31.0 (87.8)	24.7 (76.5)	17.0 (62.6)	14.5 (58.1)	35.8 (96.4)
Mean daily maximum °C (°F)	0.6 (33.1)	2.2 (36.0)	6.6 (43.9)	12.7 (54.9)	17.1 (62.8)	20.6 (69.1)	22.6 (72.7)	22.4 (72.3)	17.2 (63.0)	11.4 (52.5)	5.1 (41.2)	1.3 (34.3)	11.7 (53.1)
Daily mean °C (°F)	−1.8 (28.8)	−1.0 (30.2)	2.4 (36.3)	7.5 (45.5)	12.0 (53.6)	15.4 (59.7)	17.2 (63.0)	16.7 (62.1)	12.0 (53.6)	7.2 (45.0)	2.4 (36.3)	−0.9 (30.4)	7.4 (45.3)
Mean daily minimum °C (°F)	−4.6 (23.7)	−4.4 (24.1)	−1.6 (29.1)	1.7 (35.1)	5.9 (42.6)	9.1 (48.4)	11.0 (51.8)	10.6 (51.1)	7.0 (44.6)	3.4 (38.1)	−0.3 (31.5)	−3.5 (25.7)	2.9 (37.2)
Record low °C (°F)	−23.4 (−10.1)	−23.2 (−9.8)	−19.5 (−3.1)	−11.1 (12.0)	−5.4 (22.3)	−1.7 (28.9)	0.8 (33.4)	1.5 (34.7)	−2.8 (27.0)	−9.5 (14.9)	−14.0 (6.8)	−25.1 (−13.2)	−25.1 (−13.2)
Average precipitation mm (inches)	35.5 (1.40)	27.8 (1.09)	34.9 (1.37)	29.9 (1.18)	56.5 (2.22)	71.1 (2.80)	68.3 (2.69)	67.0 (2.64)	55.0 (2.17)	43.0 (1.69)	38.9 (1.53)	40.8 (1.61)	568.4 (22.38)
Average snowfall cm (inches)	28.9 (11.4)	23.1 (9.1)	12.0 (4.7)	1.7 (0.7)	0.0 (0.0)	0.0 (0.0)	0.0 (0.0)	0.0 (0.0)	0.0 (0.0)	0.9 (0.4)	10.8 (4.3)	24.6 (9.7)	101.9 (40.1)
Average precipitation days (≥ 1.0 mm)	9.0	7.2	8.3	6.9	9.7	10.3	10.7	9.4	8.1	8.5	8.5	9.2	105.9
Average relative humidity (%)	87.4	83.1	78.0	69.2	69.1	69.8	69.4	71.7	79.4	85.0	89.8	89.6	78.5
Mean monthly sunshine hours	44.2	75.3	116.0	177.9	209.5	213.9	229.0	222.9	154.9	100.5	41.2	33.8	1,619
Source 1: NOAA
Source 2: Czech Hydrometeorological Institute

== History ==
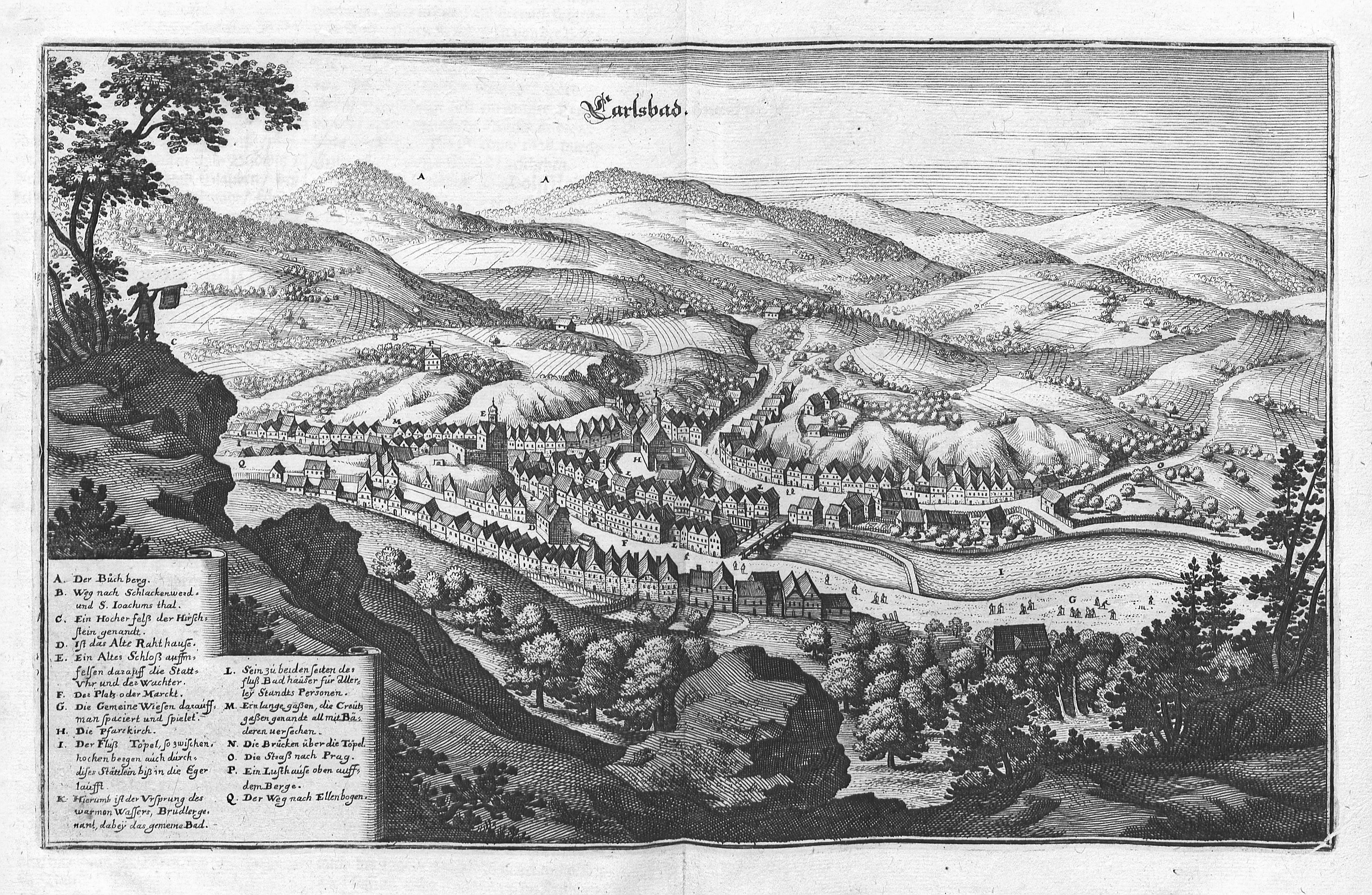
Karlovy Vary, 1650; engraving by Matthäus Merian

An ancient late Bronze Age fortified settlement was found in Drahovice. A Slavic settlement on the site of Karlovy Vary is documented by findings in Tašovice and Sedlec. People lived in close proximity to the site as far back as the 13th century and they must have been aware of the curative effects of thermal springs.

From the end of the 12th century to the early 13th century, German settlers from nearby German-speaking regions came as settlers, craftsmen and miners to develop the region's economy. Eventually, Karlovy Vary/Karlsbad became a town with a German-speaking population.

In 1325, Obora, a village in today's city area, was mentioned. Karlovy Vary as a small spa settlement was founded most likely around 1349. According to legend, Charles IV organised an expedition into the forests surrounding modern-day Karlovy Vary during a stay in Loket. It is said that his party once discovered a hot spring by accident, and thanks to the water from the spring, Charles IV healed his injured leg. On the site of a spring, he established a spa mentioned as in dem warmen Bade bey dem Elbogen in German, or Horké Lázně u Lokte (Hot Spas at the Loket). The location was subsequently named "Karlsbad" after the emperor. Charles IV granted the town privileges on 14 August 1370. Earlier settlements can also be found on the outskirts of today's city.

=== 19th and 20th centuries ===
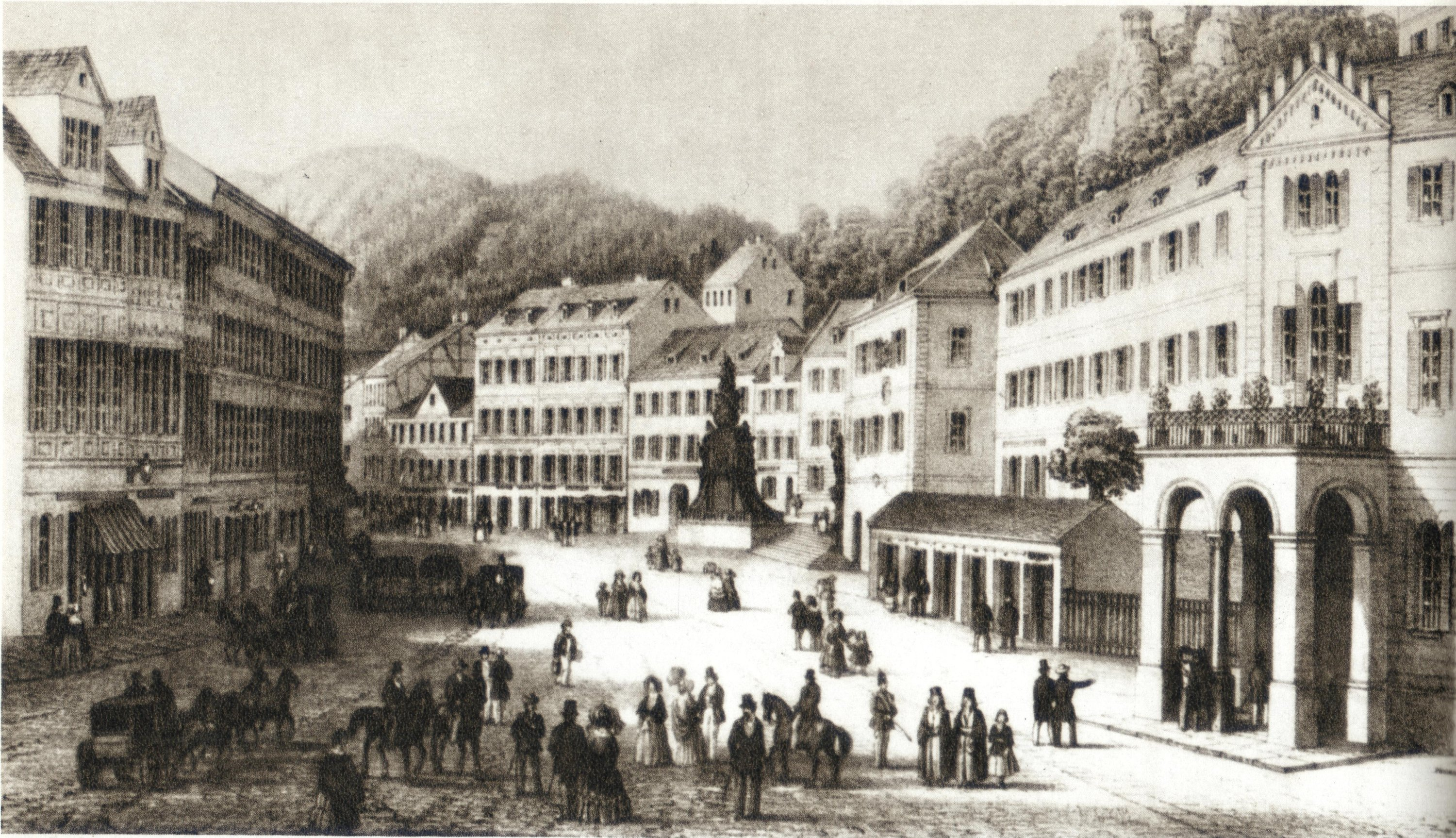
Karlovy Vary in 1850

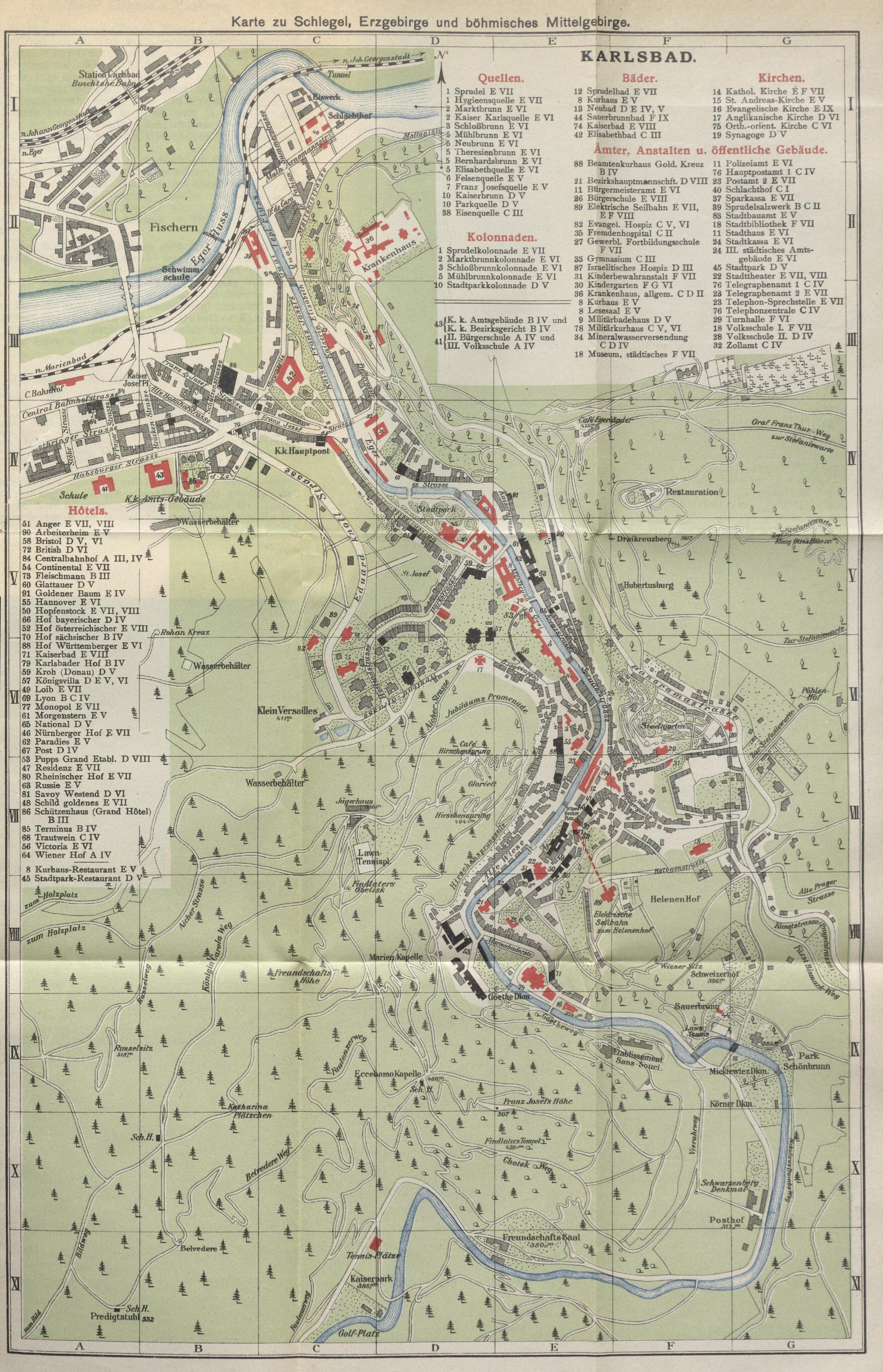
Map of the city (c. 1909)

An important political event took place in the city in 1819, with the issuing of the Carlsbad Decrees following a conference there. Initiated by the Austrian Minister of State Klemens von Metternich, the decrees were intended to implement anti-liberal censorship within the German Confederation.

Due to publications produced by physicians such as David Becher and Josef von Löschner, the city developed into a spa resort in the 19th century and was visited by many members of European aristocracy as well as celebrities from many fields of endeavour. It became even more popular after railway lines were completed from Prague to Cheb in 1870.

The number of visitors rose from 134 families in the 1756 season to 26,000 guests annually at the end of the 19th century. The greatest year for tourism was 1911, when the number of visitors reached 70,956. World War I ended the development of tourism. Other disasters for tourism were the world economic crisis and the beginning of World War II.

At the end of World War I in 1918, the large German-speaking population of Bohemia was incorporated into the new state of Czechoslovakia in accordance with the Treaty of Saint-Germain-en-Laye (1919). As a result, the German-speaking majority of Karlovy Vary protested. A demonstration on 4 March 1919 passed peacefully, but later that month, six demonstrators were killed by Czech troops after a demonstration became unruly.

According to the 1930 census, the city was home to 23,901 inhabitants – 20,856 were ethnic Germans, 1,446 were Czechoslovaks (Czechs or Slovaks), 243 were Jews, 19 were Hungarians and 12 were Poles.

In 1938, the city was annexed by Nazi Germany according to the terms of the Munich Agreement and administered as part of the Reichsgau Sudetenland. During World War II, the Germans established a Gestapo prison here. After the war, in accordance with the Potsdam Agreement and Beneš decrees, most German-speaking inhabitants were expelled.

After the Velvet Revolution in 1989, spas and tourism began to develop rapidly again. The spa buildings were reconstructed and the spa became competitive again within Europe. The spa became popular with Russian clientele, and brought many Russian investors and developers to the city and its surroundings.

== Demographics ==
In 2017, non-Czech residents were around 7% of the population of the Karlovy Vary region. After Prague, this is the highest proportion in the Czech Republic. The largest group of foreigners were Vietnamese, followed by Germans, Ukrainians and Russians.

As of 2026, the population is 48,788, of which 47.2% are male, and 52.8% are female. People under 15 years old make up 12.6% of the population, and people over 65 years old make up 25.1%.

Historical population

Year	Pop.	±%
1869	14,185	—
1880	22,318	+57.3%
1890	28,629	+28.3%
1900	42,653	+49.0%
1910	52,808	+23.8%

Year	Pop.	±%
1921	53,112	+0.6%
1930	63,506	+19.6%
1950	41,136	−35.2%
1961	50,034	+21.6%
1970	52,310	+4.5%

Year	Pop.	±%
1980	56,992	+9.0%
1991	56,054	−1.6%
2001	53,358	−4.8%
2011	48,639	−8.8%
2021	44,323	−8.9%

Source: Censuses

=== 2021 census ===
As of the 2021 census, 13.0% of the population was born in another country, and 11.6% has foreign citizenship – 0.6% has Slovak, 3.1% Ukrainian, 2.3% Russian, 1.7% Vietnamese, and 3.9% other citizenship.

As of the 2021 census, 84.8% of the population has Czech as their mother tongue, 1.5% Slovak, 3.3% Russian, 1.9% Ukrainian, 1.4% Vietnamese, and 7.1% other languages.

As of the 2021 census, 25.5% of the population is religious, of which 3.8% belong to the Roman Catholic Church, 0.2% to the Czechoslovak Hussite Church, and 0.3% to the Evangelical United Brethren Church, and 12.9% do not belong to a church or religious society. Another 74.5% of the population is irreligious.

== Economy ==
The city's economy is focused on services and only small and medium-sized industrial enterprises are based in it. The main industry is the food and beverage industry, characterised by the bottling of mineral waters and the production of unique delicacies. The largest industrial employer based in the city is Mattoni 1873. Karlovy Vary is known for the popular Czech liqueur Becherovka, which has been produced here since 1807. The Karlovarské oplatky (Carlsbad wafers) originated in the city in 1867. The city has also lent its name to "Carlsbad plums", candied stuffed prune plums.

The other important industries are the production of glass and porcelain. Karlovy Vary is known for the lead glass manufacturer Moser founded in 1857, which is considered the most luxurious Czech brand.

The Karlovy Vary agglomeration was defined as a tool for drawing money from the European Structural and Investment Funds. It is an area that includes the city and its surroundings, linked to the city by commuting and migration. It has about 138,000 inhabitants.

=== Spas ===
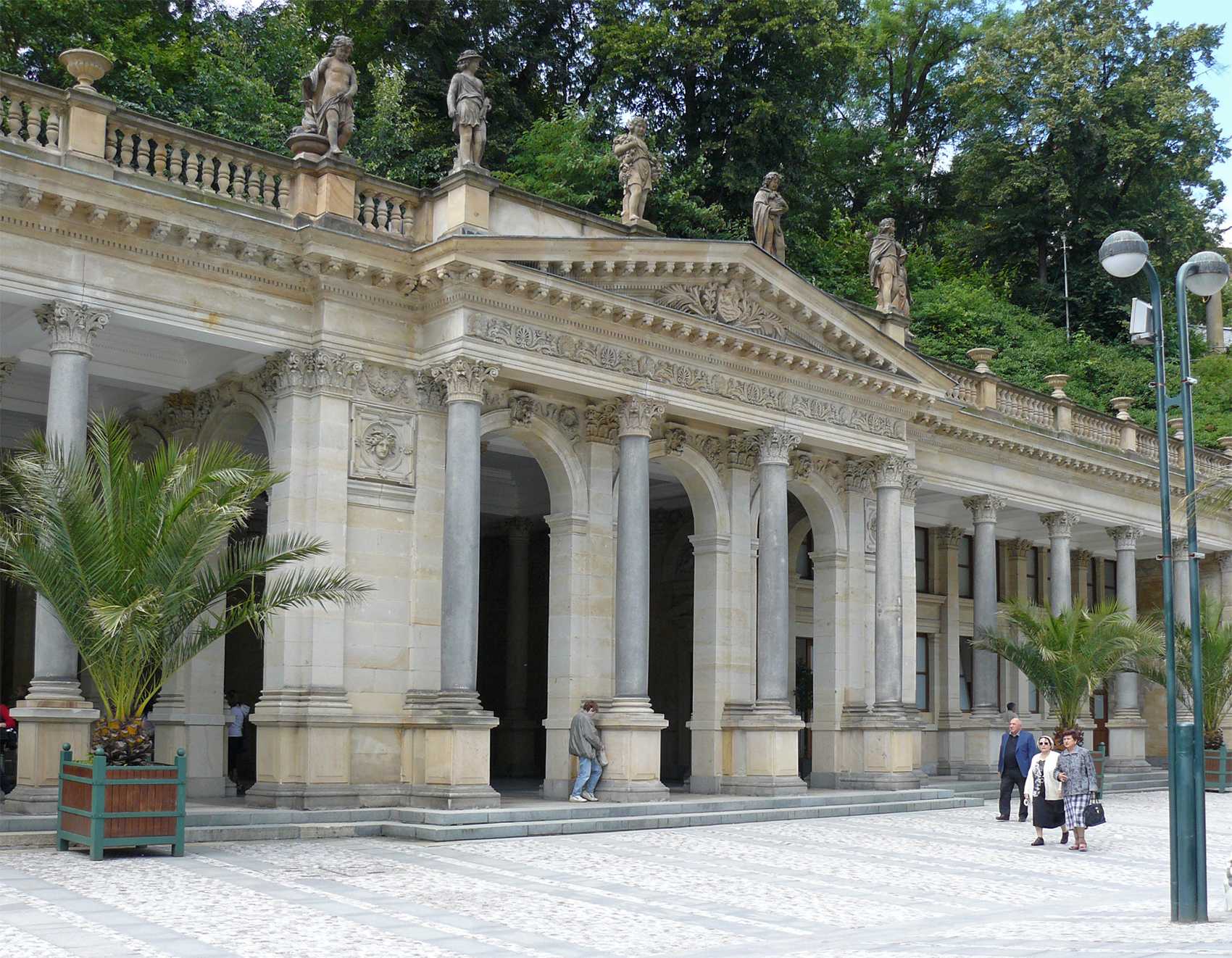
Mill Colonnade

Karlovy Vary is the most visited spa town in the Czech Republic. As the principal city on the West Bohemian Spa Triangle and the largest spa complex in Europe, Karlovy Vary has over 80 springs, but only 16 of them are for drinking. They are a part of the Eger Graben, a tectonically active region in western Bohemia. Although the infiltration area is several hundred square kilometres, each spring has the same hydrological origins, and therefore shares the same dissolved minerals and chemical formula. The hottest of the springs, Vřídlo, can approach 73.4 °C (164.1 °F), which makes it the hottest spring in the Czech Republic, while the coldest have temperatures under 40 degrees. All of the springs combined provide roughly 2,000 litres of water every minute.

== Transport ==
Local buses (Dopravní podnik Karlovy Vary) and cable cars take passengers to most areas of the city. The Imperial funicular is the oldest tunnel funicular in Europe and the steepest in the Czech Republic, the Diana funicular was at the time of commissioning the longest funicular in Austria-Hungary.

The city is accessible via the D6 motorway and inter-city public transport options include inter-city buses, České dráhy, and Deutsche Bahn via the Karlovy Vary–Johanngeorgenstadt railway. Karlovy Vary Airport is an international airport located 4.5 kilometres (3 mi) southeast from the city centre, at the village of Olšová Vrata.

== Culture ==
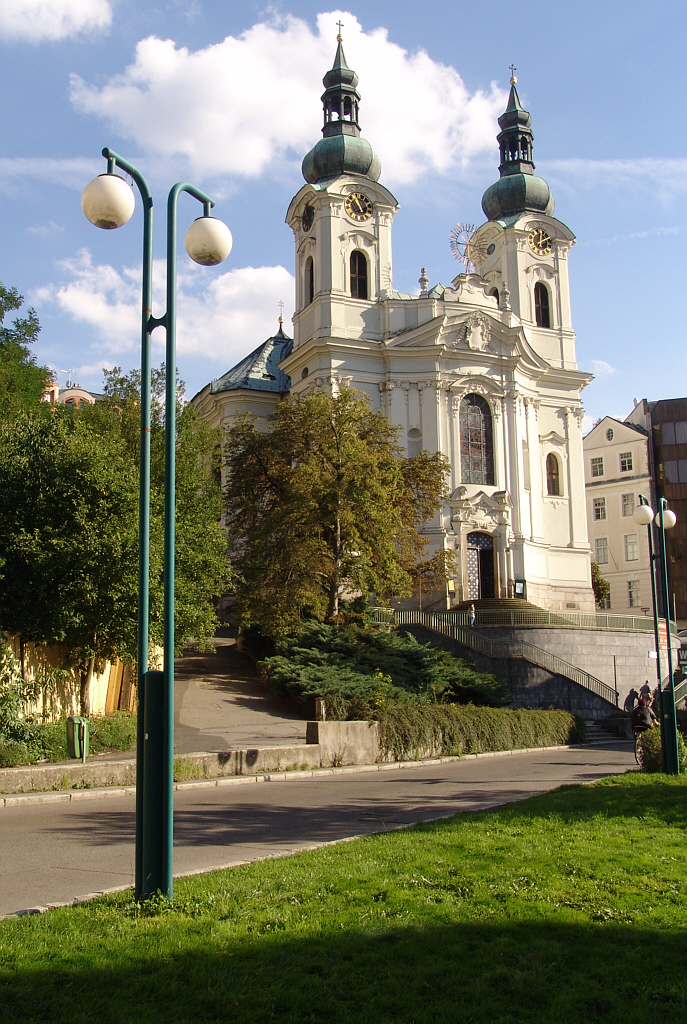
Church of St. Mary Magdalene

In the 19th century, Karlovy Vary became a popular tourist destination, especially known for international celebrities who visited for spa treatment. The city is also known for the Karlovy Vary International Film Festival, which is one of the oldest in the world and one of Europe's major film events.

The city has been used as the location for a number of film-shoots, including the 2006 films Last Holiday and Casino Royale, both of which used the city's Grandhotel Pupp in different guises. Moreover, the Palace Bristol Hotel in Karlovy Vary was used as a model for The Grand Budapest Hotel.

== Sport ==
Karlovy Vary is home to the top-tier ice hockey club HC Karlovy Vary, and the top-tier volleyball club VK Karlovarsko.

The city is also represented by the football club FC Slavia Karlovy Vary, which plays in the third tier of the Czech football system.

== Sights ==
Karlovy Vary is notable for its large concentration of monuments and architecturally valuable buildings. The origin of most of them is connected with the spa tradition of the city. Since 2018, the spa centre of the city along the Teplá river and the wider surroundings with the spa cultural landscape have been protected as an urban monument reservation. As part of the Great Spa Towns of Europe, Karlovy Vary became a UNESCO World Heritage Site because of its spas and architecture from the 18th through 20th centuries.

=== Spa buildings ===
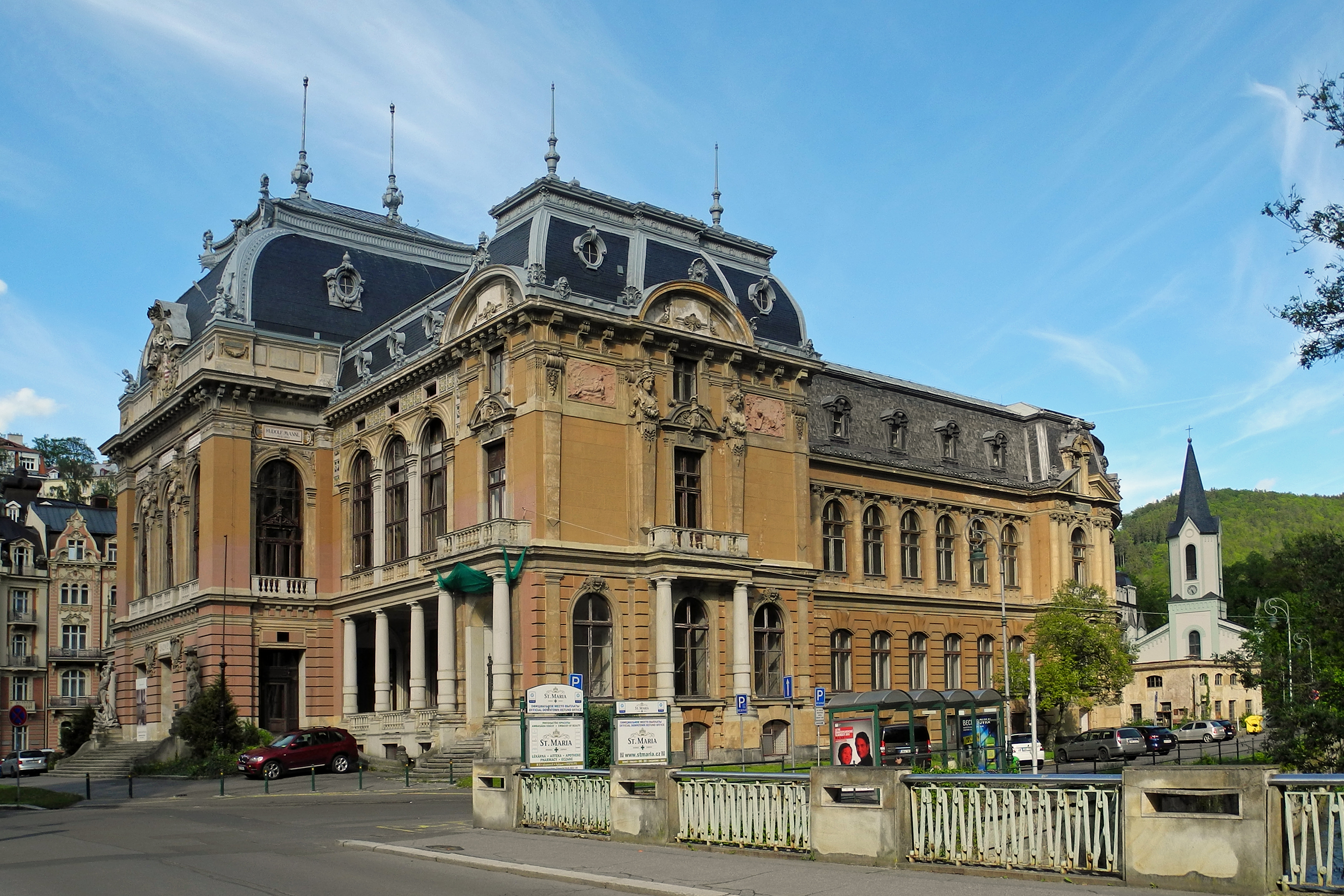
Císařské lázně spa building

Císařské lázně is the most important spa building, protected as a national cultural monument. It was built in the historicist style of the French Neo-Renaissance in 1893–1895. The largest colonnade with five mineral springs is the Mill Colonnade (Czech: Mlýnská; pseudo-Renaissance structure, built in 1871–1881). The best-known spring is Vřídlo, located in Hot Spring Colonnade (Vřídelní; built in Functionalistic style in 1975). The spring gushes out in a geyser up to 12 m (39 ft) high. Other colonnades in the city are Park Colonnade (Sadová; cast-iron architecture structure built in 1880–1881 by Fellner & Helmer), Market Colonnade (Tržní; a wooden structure, built in Swiss style in 1882–1883 by Fellner & Helmer), and Castle Colonnade (Zámecká; built in Art Nouveau style in 1910–1912 by Friedrich Ohmann).

=== Churches ===
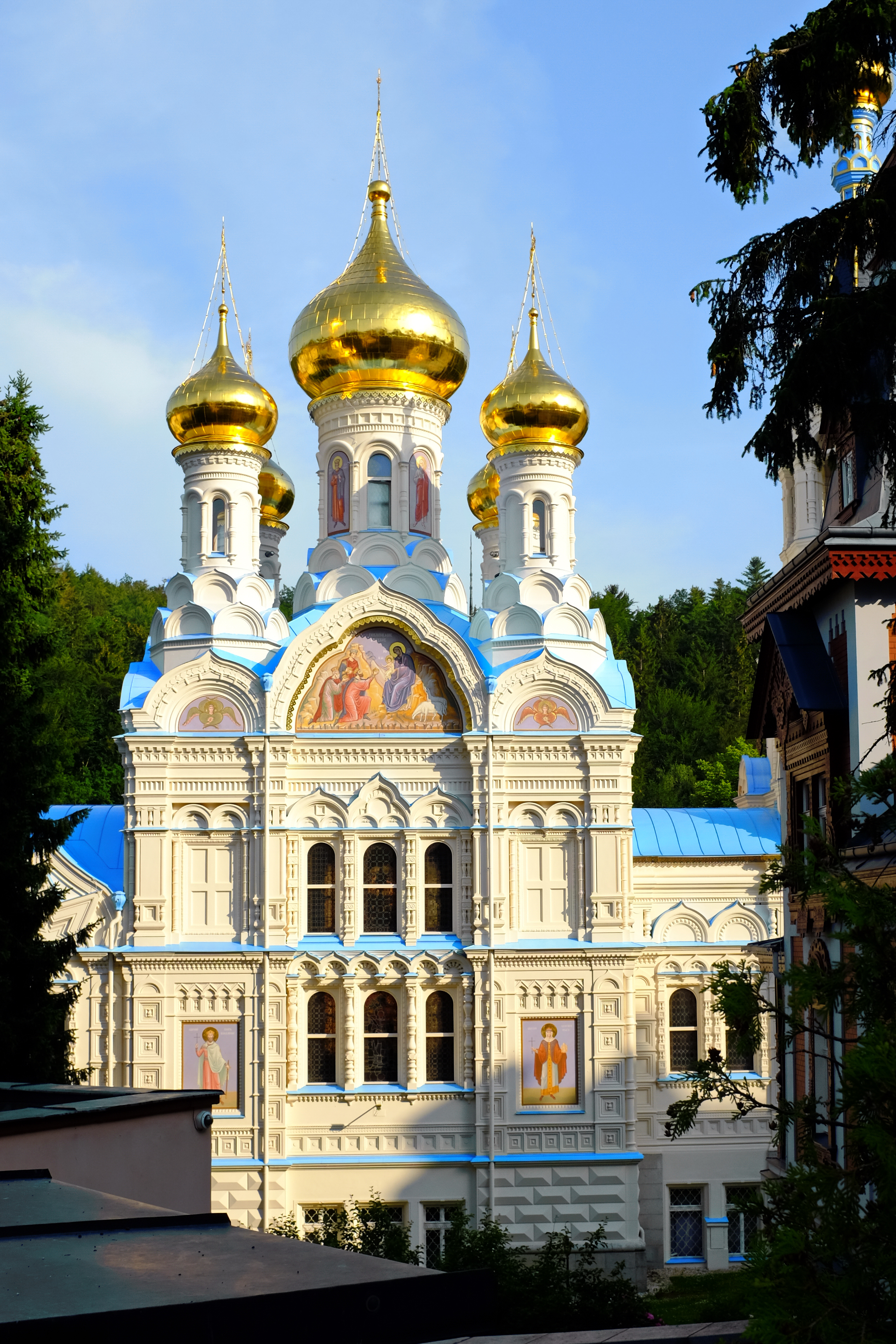
Orthodox Church of Saint Peter and Paul

The most valuable church is the Church of Saint Mary Magdalene. It is a Catholic church, built in the Baroque style in 1732–1736 on the site of an old Gothic church from the second half of the 14th century. It was built according to the design by Kilian Ignaz Dientzenhofer and belongs to the most important buildings of the Czech Baroque. It is protected as a national cultural monument.

Among the most famous buildings of the city is the Church of Saint Peter and Paul. It was built in the Byzantine style in 1893–1897. It is the largest Orthodox church west of Post-Soviet states.

The Church of Saint Andrew was built in the late Gothic style around 1500, reconstructed in the Empire style in 1840–1841. A cemetery was established next to the church for foreign guests of the spa who died in Karlovy Vary. In 1911, the cemetery was converted into a park, known as Mozart's Park, with many Neoclassical tombstones. Since 2005, it is owned by the Greek Catholic Church.

The Church of Saint Anne was built in the Baroque style in 1738–1749 on the site of an old church. It is a pilgrimage church, in the construction of which K. I. Dientzenhofer took part.

The Church of Saints Peter and Paul is a pseudo-Gothic church, built in 1854–1856 and rebuilt in 1893–1894. Since 1946, it is property of the Czechoslovak Hussite Church.

The Church of Saint Luke is a Methodist pseudo-Gothic two-aisle church, built in 1876–1877. It was built with the financial support of English spa guests. Today it no longer serves religious purposes and houses a wax museum.

The Church of Saint Leonard of Noblac was the oldest ecclesiastical structure in the territory of Karlovy Vary. It was first documented in 1246. This late Romanesque structure is located in the woods south of the city proper, where a village used to be. From the end of the 15th century, after the village was depopulated, the church began to deteriorate and became a ruin.

== Notable people ==
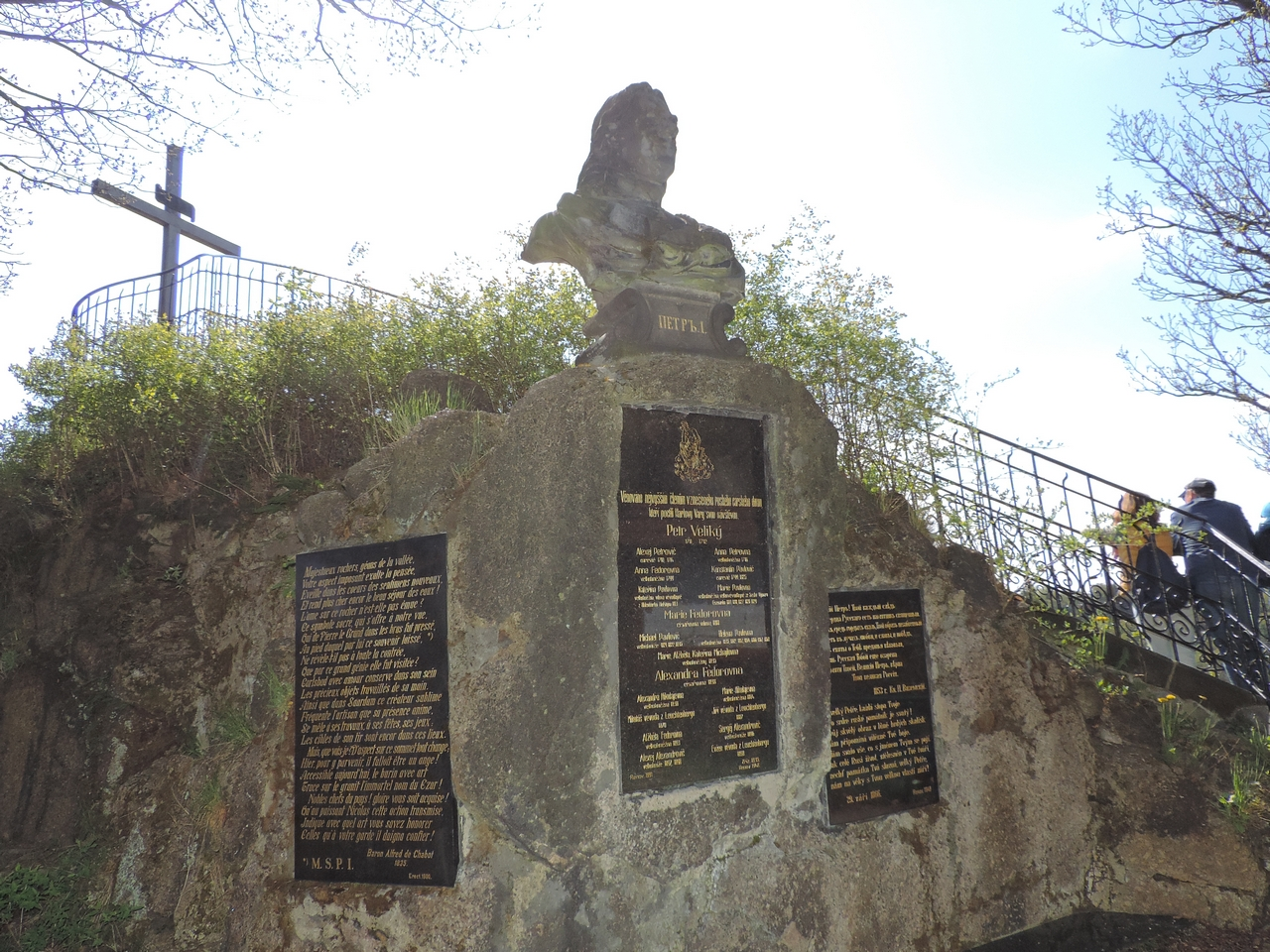
Peter the Great Monument

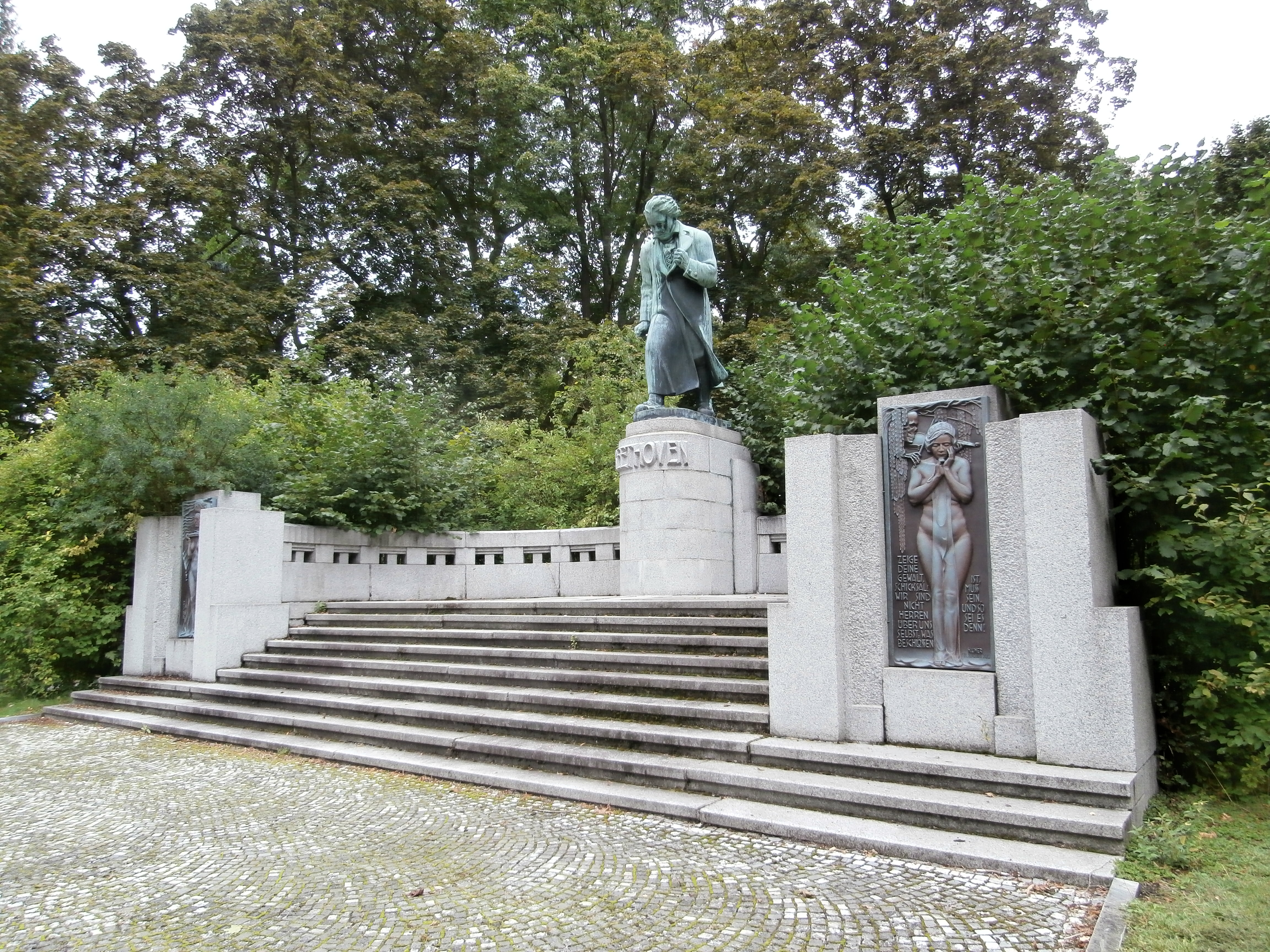
Ludwig van Beethoven Monument

- Johann Josef Loschmidt (1821–1895), Austrian scientist
- Ignaz Ziegler (1861–1948), Austrian-Czech rabbi
- Walter Serner (1889–1942), writer, dadaist
- Lily Pincus (1898–1981), German-British social worker, marital psychotherapist and author
- Franz Planer (1894–1963), Czech-American cinematographer
- Karl Hermann Frank (1898–1946), Nazi official
- Walter Becher (1912–2005), German-Czech politician
- Zbyněk Brynych (1927–1995), film director
- Gerda Mayer (1927–2021), English poet
- Georg Riedel (1934–2024), Swedish musician and composer
- Karin Stoiber (born 1943), former First Lady of Bavaria
- Rudolf Křesťan (born 1943), writer
- Princess Michael of Kent (born 1945), member of the British royal family
- Vašo Patejdl (1954–2023), Slovak musician and composer
- Stanislav Birner (born 1956), tennis player
- Josef Řihák (born 1959), politician
- Rick Lanz (born 1961), Canadian ice hockey player
- Ludmila Peterková (born 1967), clarinetist
- Karel Dobrý (born 1969), actor
- Jaroslava Pokorná Jermanová (born 1970), politician
- Karel Rada (born 1971), footballer
- Jana Sýkorová (born 1973) opera singer
- Tomáš Vokoun (born 1976), ice hockey player
- Simona Kijonková (born 1977), entrepreneur
- Petr Kopfstein (born 1978), aerobatic pilot
- Tomáš Došek (born 1978), footballer
- Milan Šperl (born 1980), cross country skier
- Hana Soukupová (born 1985), supermodel
- Tomáš Borek (born 1986), footballer
- Aiko (born 1999), Russian-Czech singer; lives here
- Pavel Šulc (born 2000), footballer

=== Associated with the city ===
- Dorothea Sophie (1636–1689), Electress of Brandenburg, died in Karlsbad
- Peter the Great (1672–1725), Tsar of Russia; visited Karlovy Vary in 1711
- Johann Wolfgang von Goethe (1749–1832), German poet, novelist and scientist; published a paper on local geology
- James Ogilvy, 7th Earl of Findlater (1750–1811), Scottish noble and an accomplished amateur landscape architect and philanthropist; regularly visited the spa and became a patron of the city
- Jean de Carro (1770–1857), Swiss physician; published the Almanach de Carlsbad
- Ludwig van Beethoven (1770–1827), composer; came twice for spa treatments. In 1812, he performed a concert in the Czech Hall of the Grandhotel Pupp.
- Adalbert Stifter (1805–1868), Austrian writer; treated here in 1865–1867
- Frédéric Chopin (1810–1849), composer; he and his parents met for the last time during a holiday in Karlsbad, August/September 1835
- Ivan Turgenev (1818–1883), Russian novelist; visited Karlsbad on numerous occasions
- Anthony J. Drexel (1826–1893), senior partner of Drexel, Morgan & Co. (JPMorgan, today) and founder of Drexel University; died in Karlsbad in 1893
- Mustafa Kemal Atatürk (1881–1938), founder of the Republic of Turkey, as well as its first President; treated here in 1918
- David Makofski (1892–1974), British tailor; visited the spa for arthritis treatment, and which contributed to his efforts to help Jewish refugees escape from Nazi Germany
- František Běhounek (1898–1973), scientist and novelist; died here
- Vladimir Voronin (born 1941), former president of the Republic of Moldova; visits Karlovy Vary every year for spa treatments

== International relations ==
=== Name sharing ===
This places take their names from Karlovy Vary's English name, Carlsbad. All of these places were so named because they were the sites of mineral springs or natural sources of mineral water.

- Carlsbad, New Mexico, United States (after which Carlsbad Caverns National Park is named)
- Carlsbad, California, United States
- Carlsbad Springs, Ontario, Canada
- Carlsbad, Texas, United States

=== Twin towns – sister cities ===
Karlovy Vary is twinned with:

- Baden-Baden, Germany
- Bernkastel-Kues, Germany
- Carlsbad, United States
- Eilat, Israel
- Kusatsu, Japan
- Locarno, Switzerland
- Varberg, Sweden

== Gallery ==
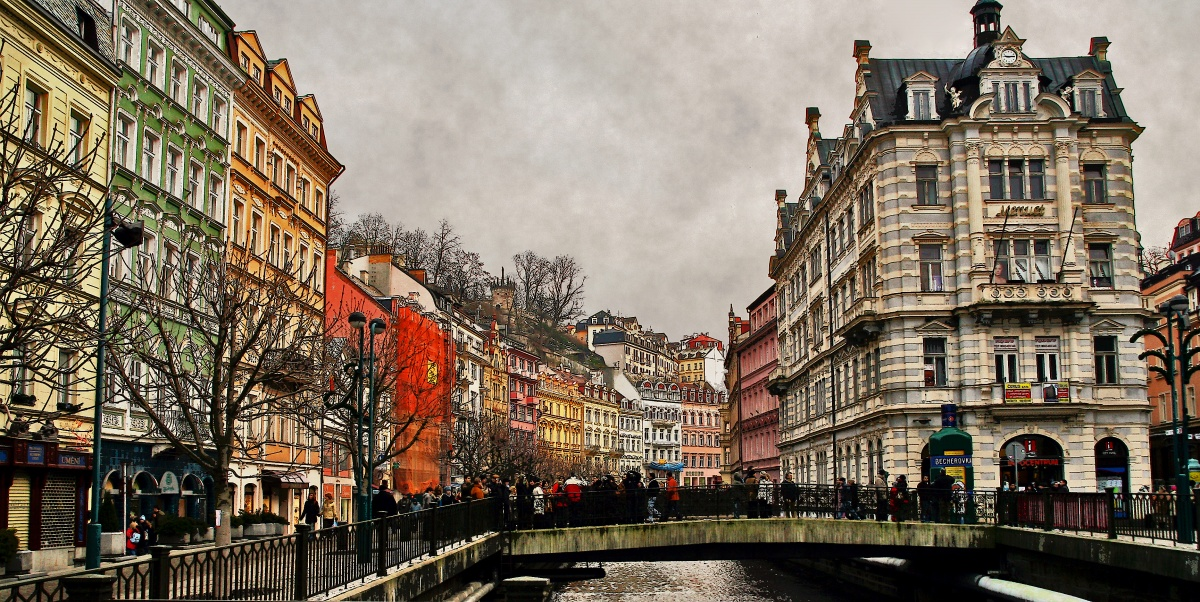
Teplá River embankment

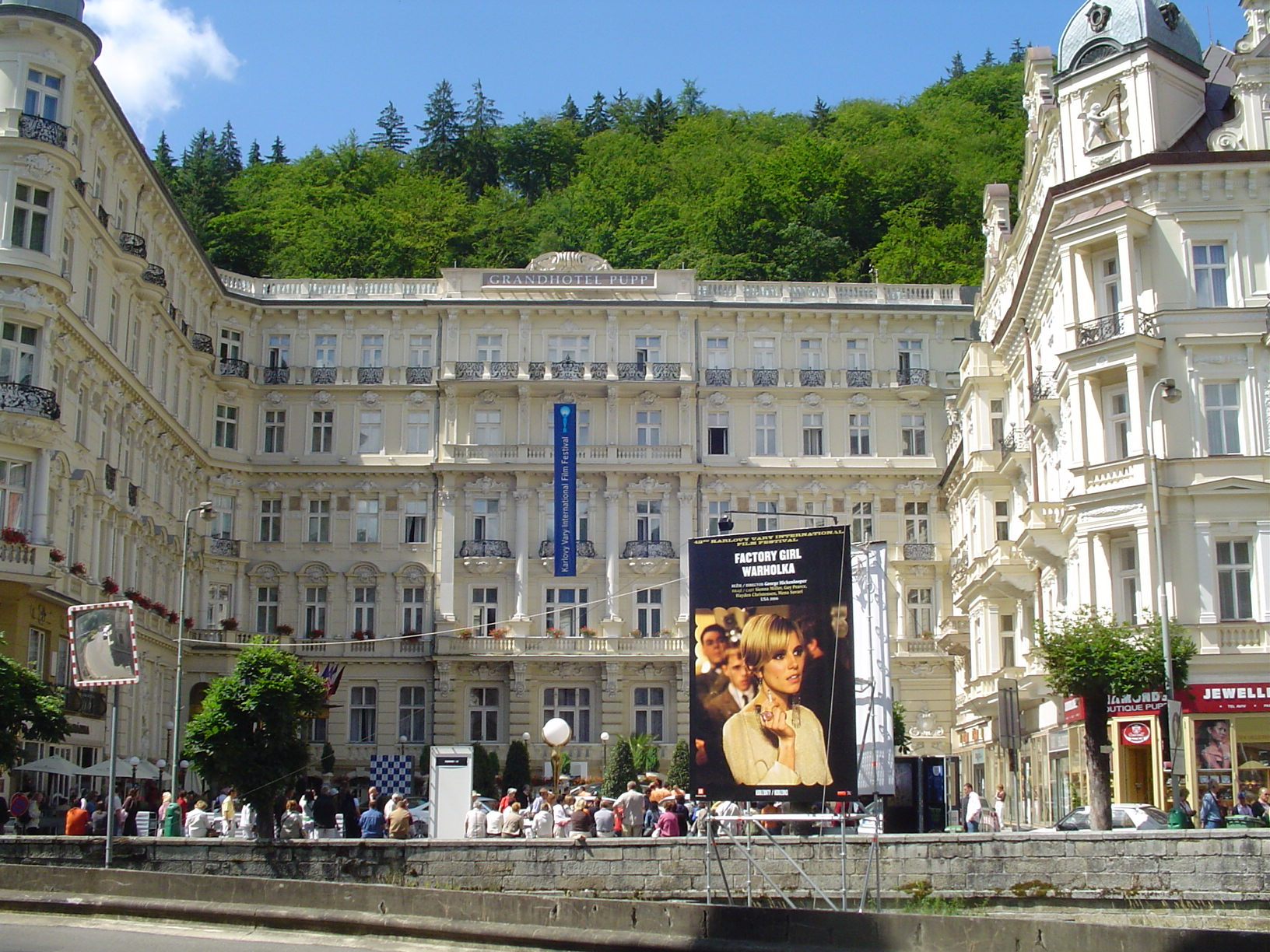
The Grandhotel Pupp

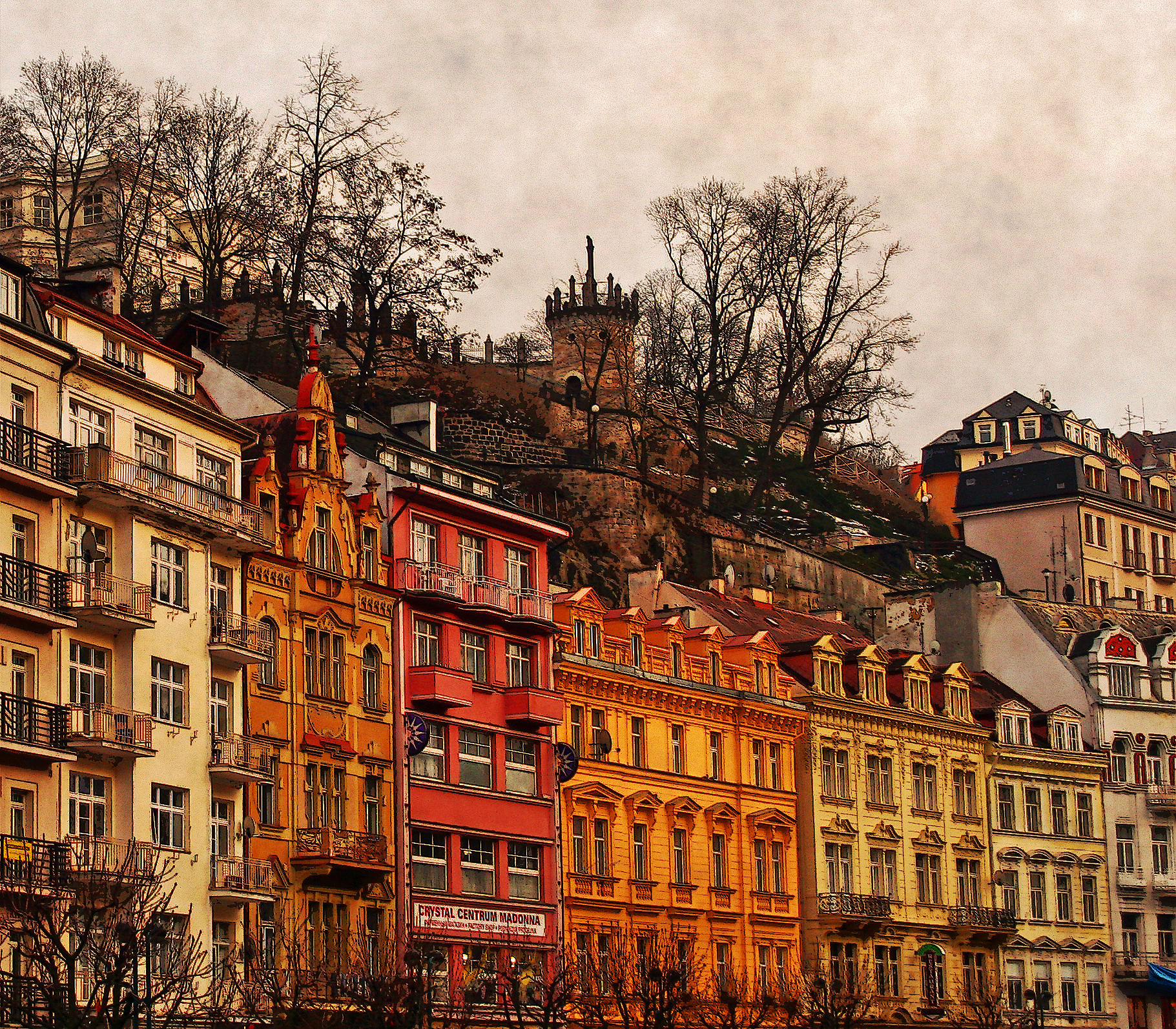
Vřídelní street, above sets of Jeanna de Carro

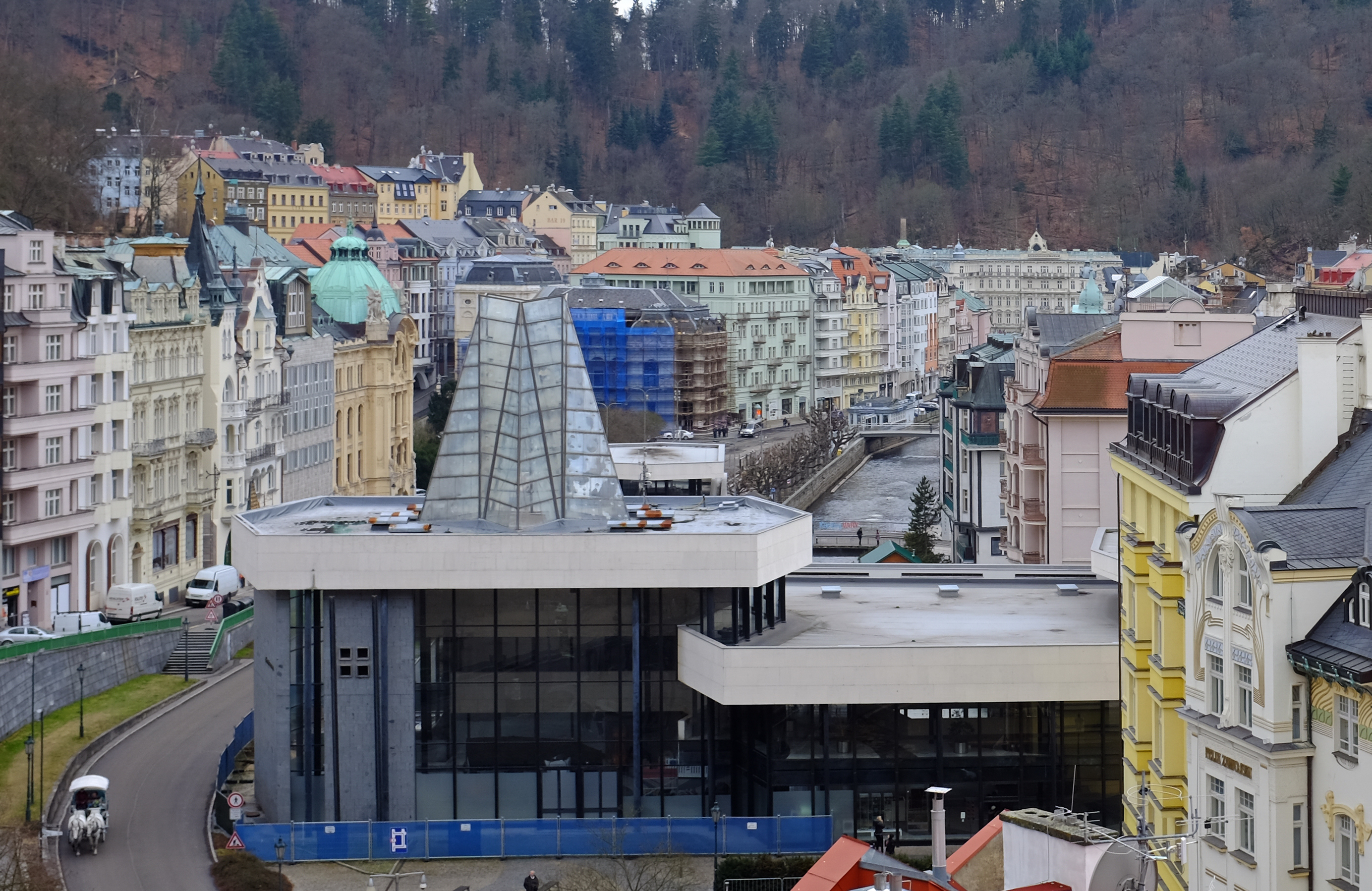
Hot Spring Colonnade and Vřídelní street

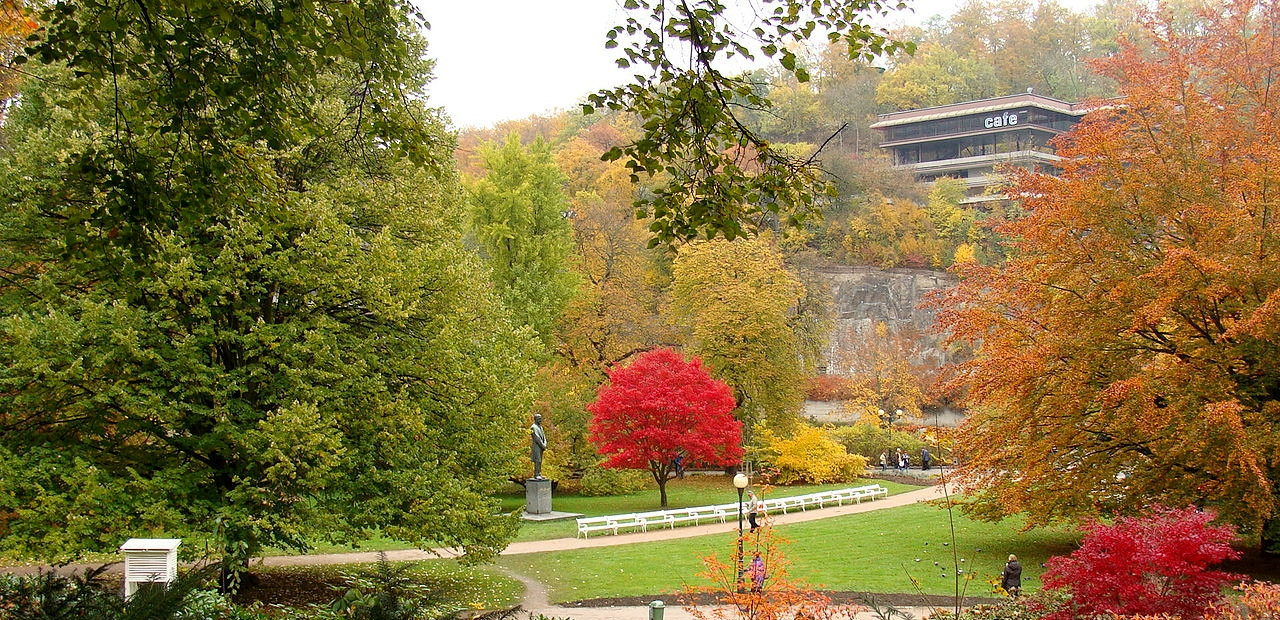
Dvořák Park

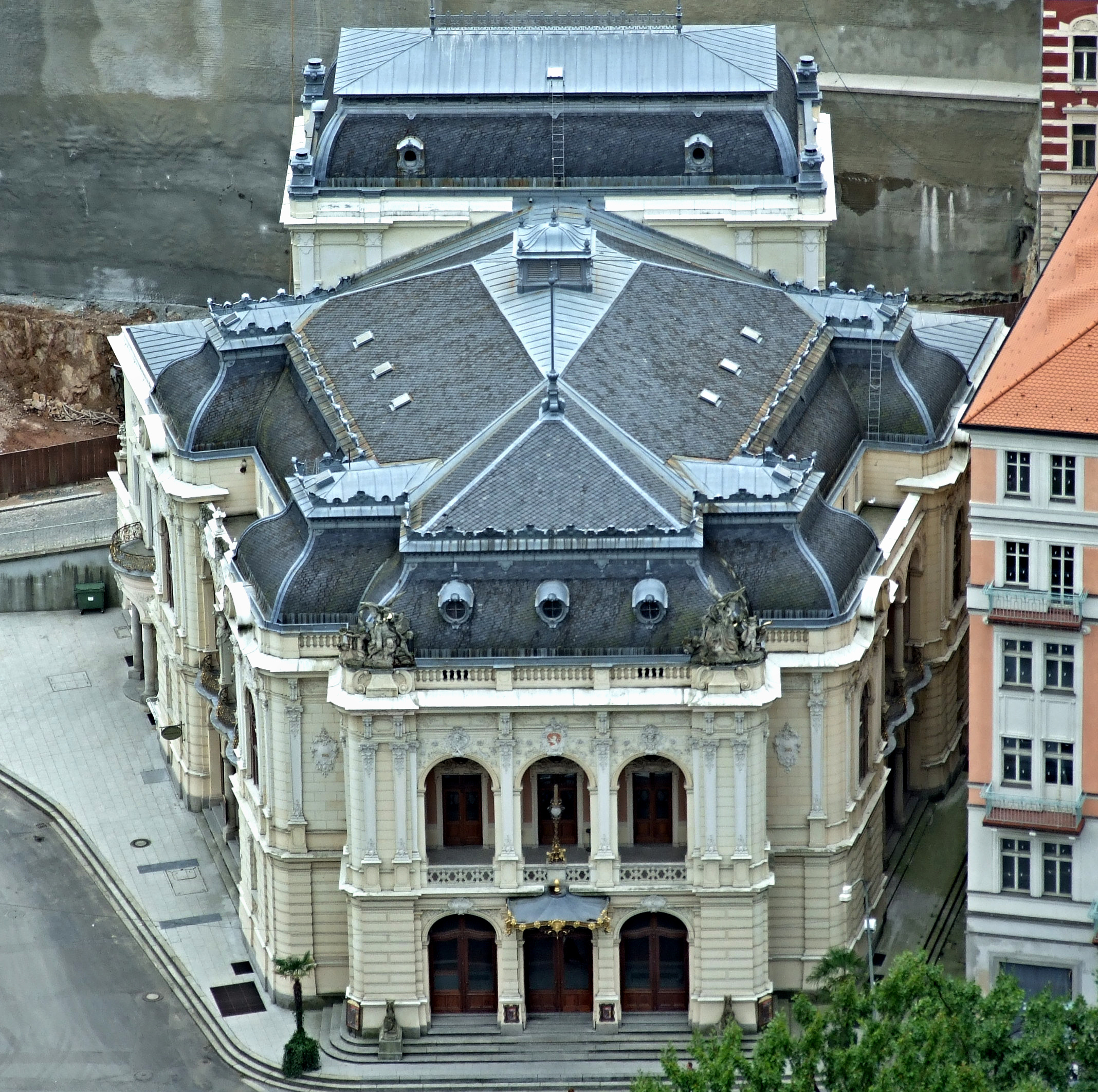
City Opera House

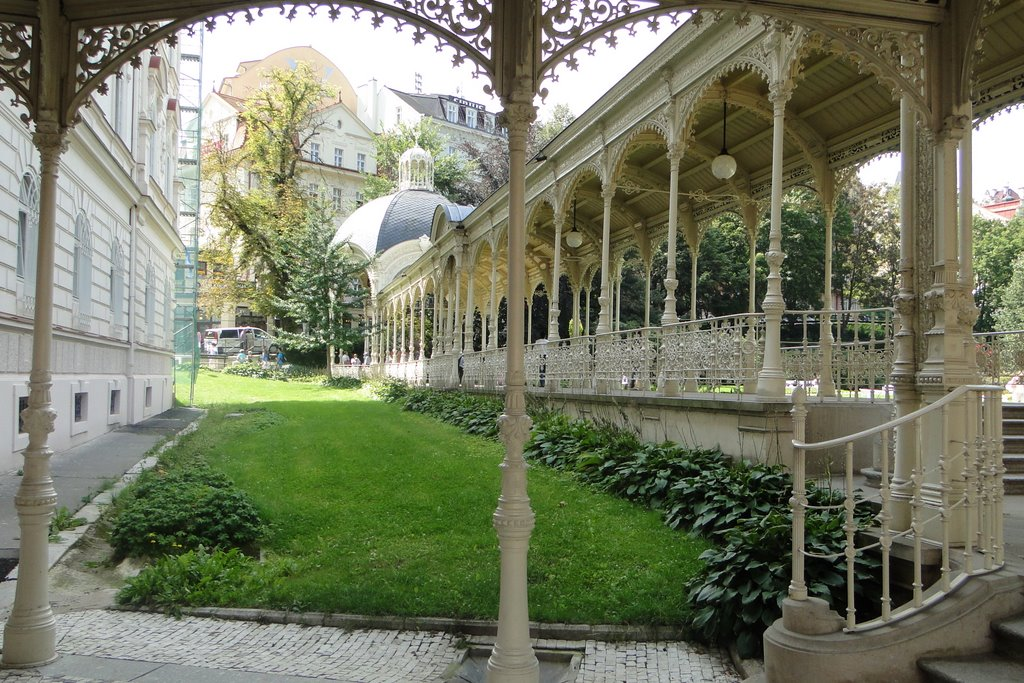
Park Colonnade

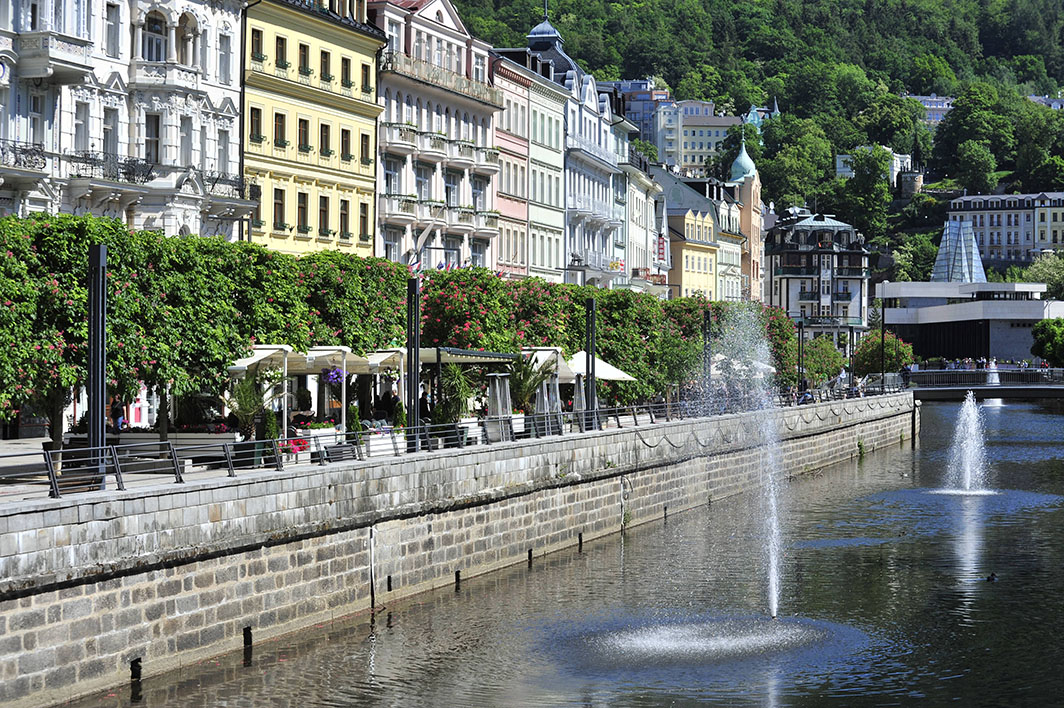
Canal in Karlovy Vary

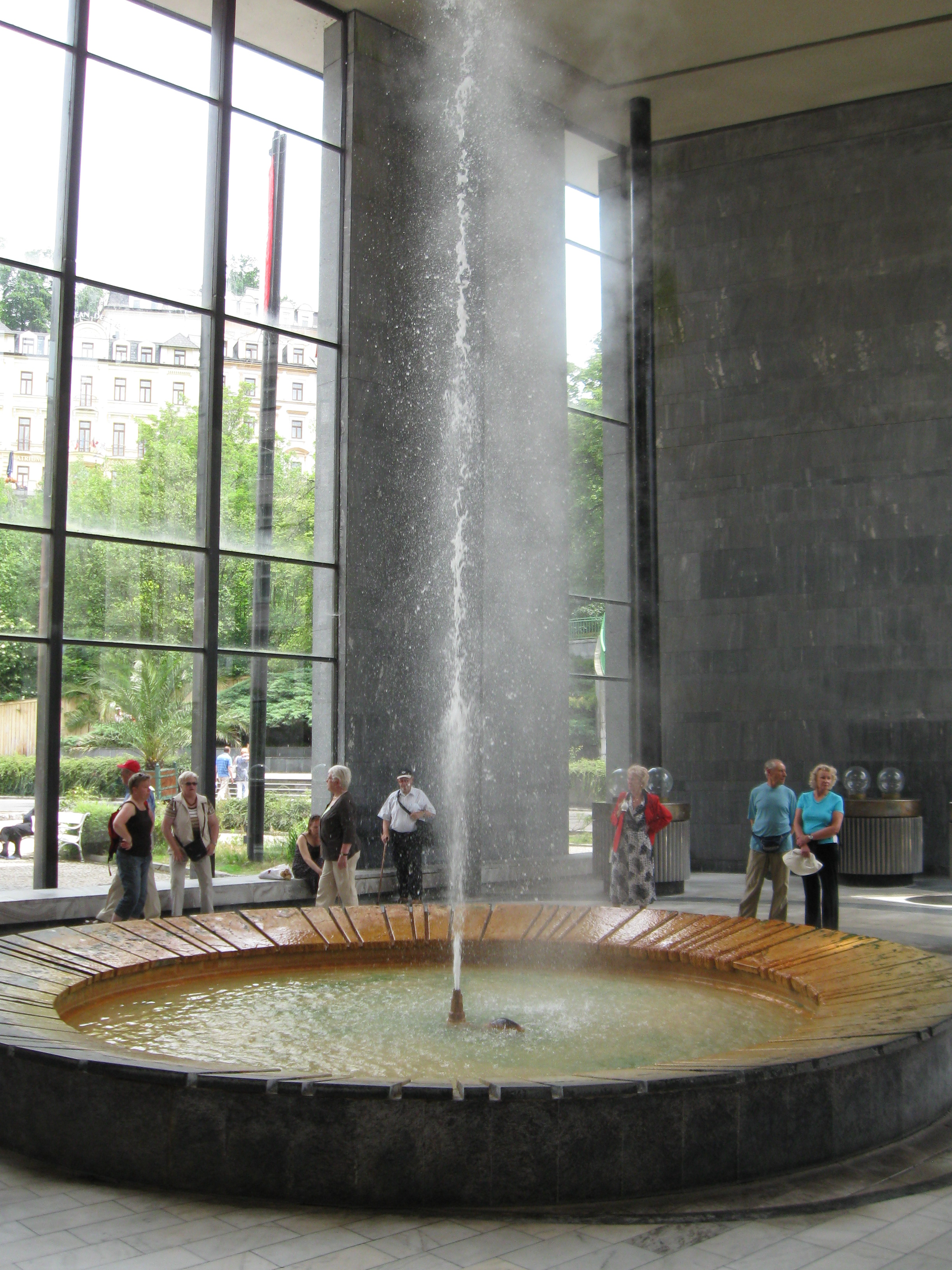
Vřídlo, a geyser of mineral water

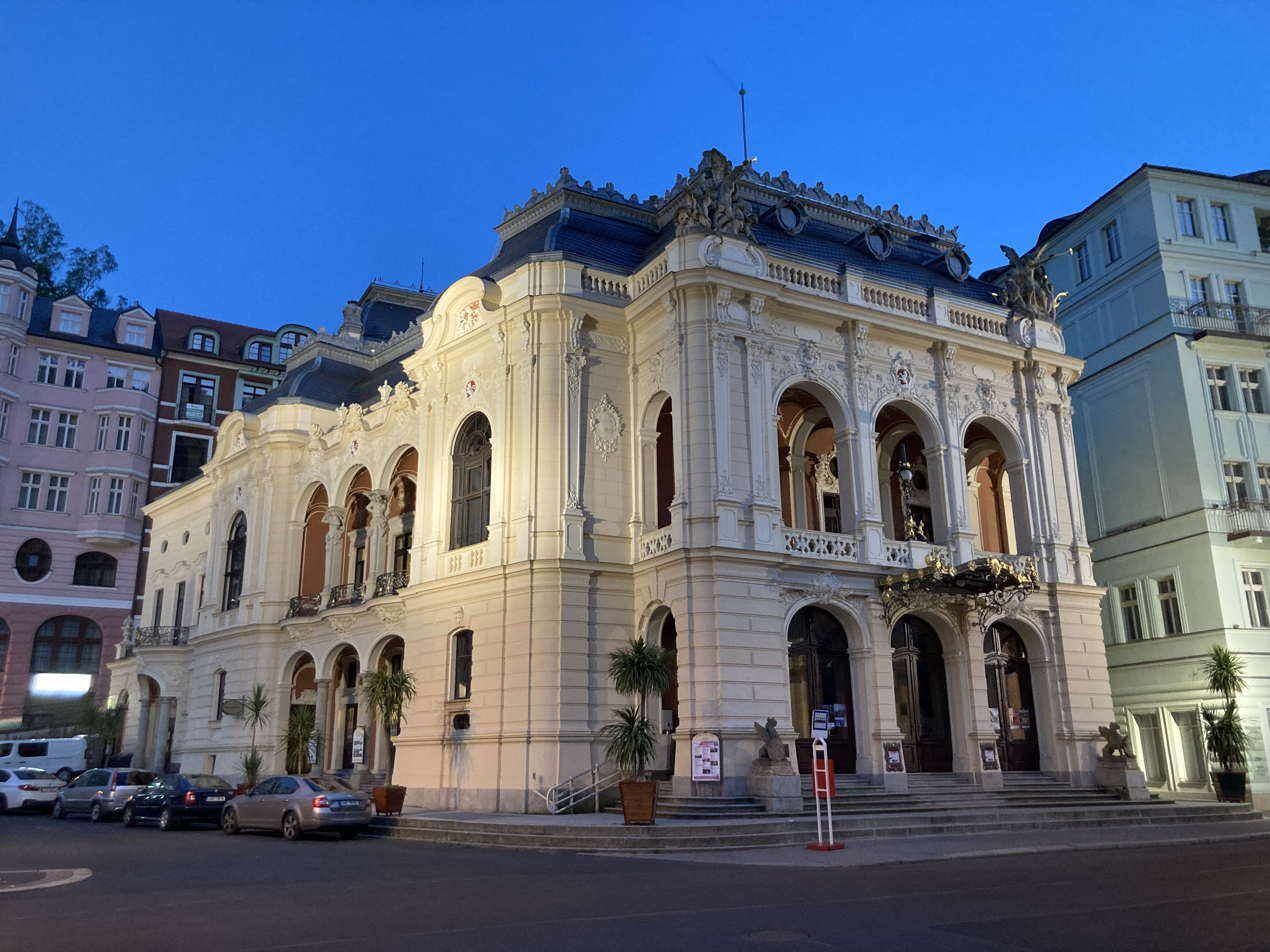
City theatre

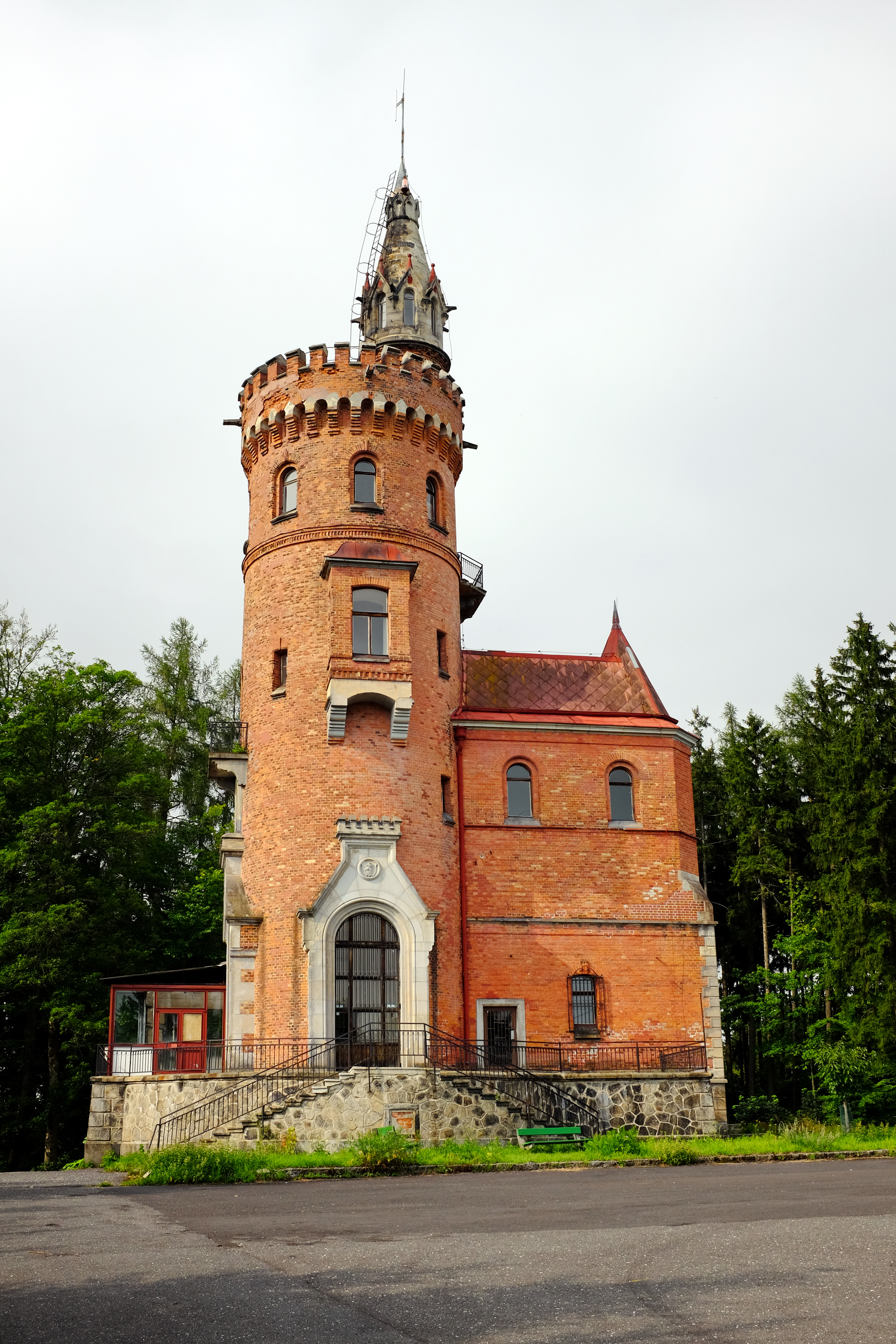
Goethe's Lookout

=== Panorama ===
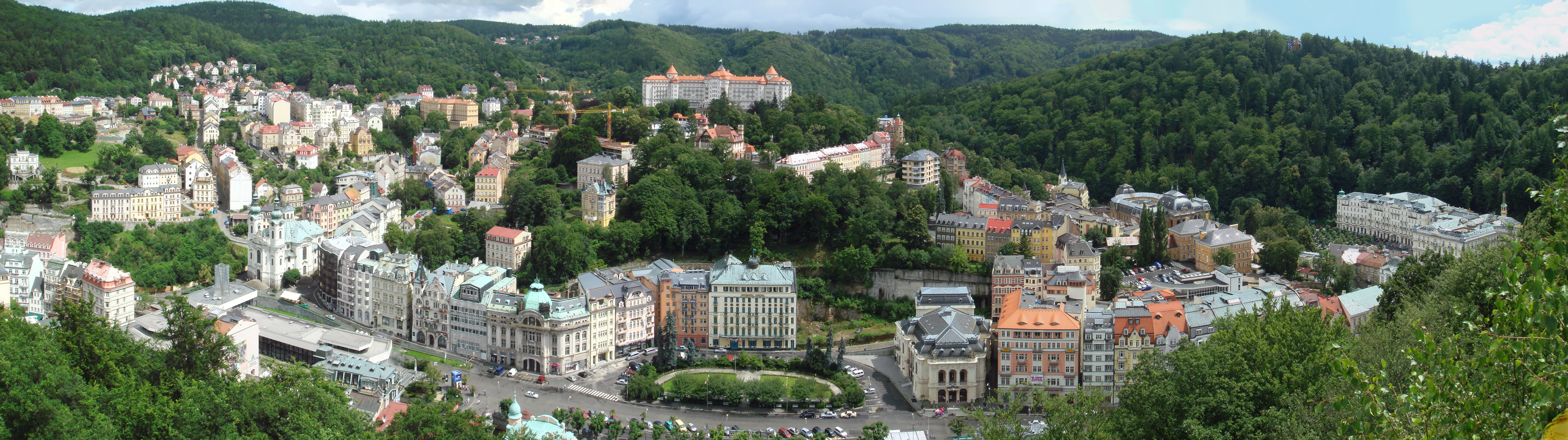
Key sites, from left to right, are: the dark grey Hot Spring Colonnade featuring a glass chimney. Directly above is the twin-steeple Church of St. Mary Magdalene. The large, stately building on the central hill is the Hotel Imperial. Below, to the right of the square, is the Opera House. The Grandhotel Pupp is the large white building, far right.

== See also ==
- Karlsbad-style coffee maker
