= Karlovy Vary (administrative district) =

Administrative district in the Czech Republic

Administrative district of the municipality with extended powers of Karlovy Vary Správní obvod obce s rozšířenou působností Karlovy Vary
- Administrative district of municipality with extended powers
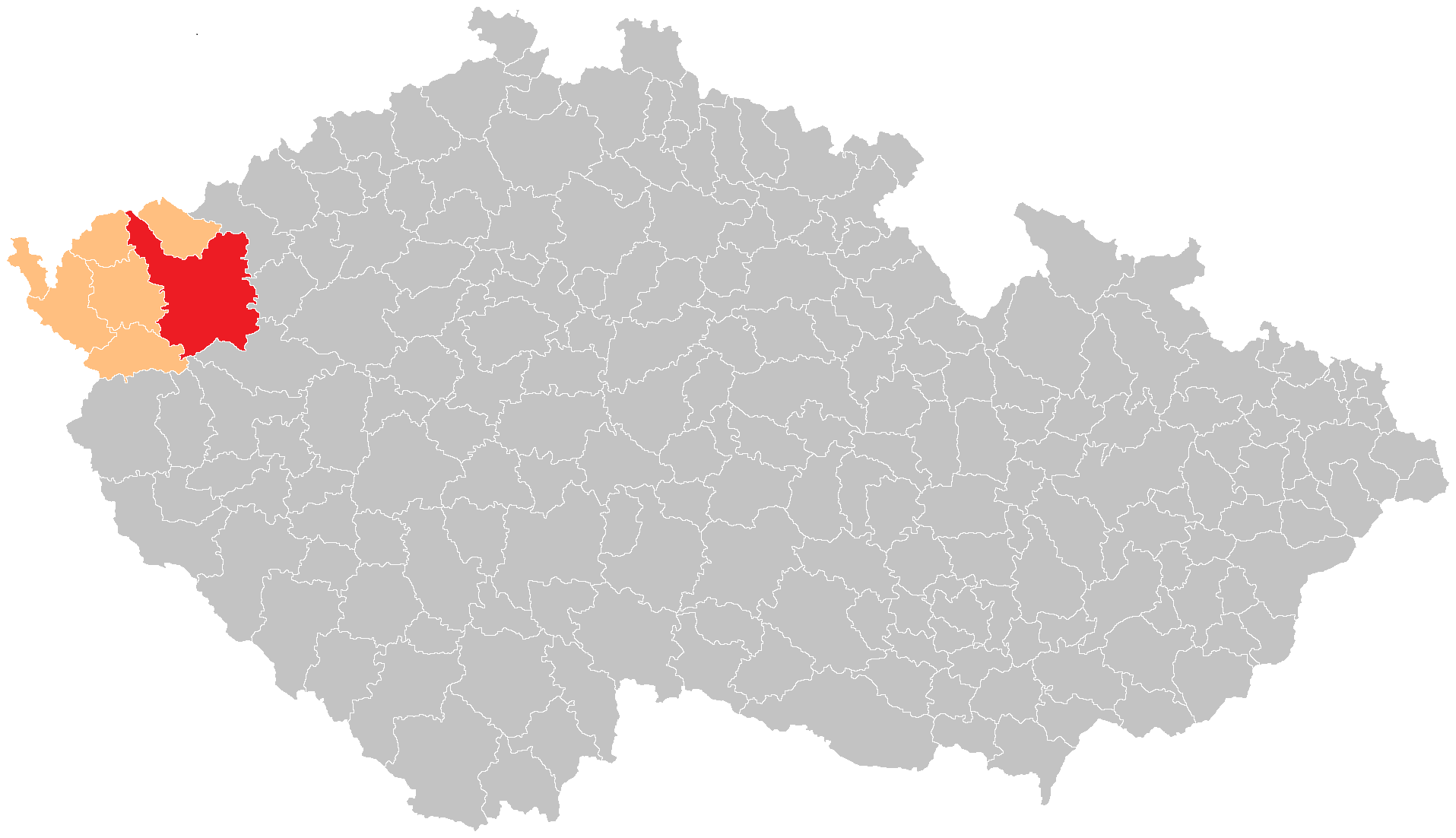
- Location in the Karlovy Vary Region within the Czech Republic
- Coordinates: 50°10′N 13°1′E
- Country: Czech Republic
- Region: Karlovy Vary
- District: Karlovy Vary
- Municipality with extended powers: Karlovy Vary

Area
  - Total: 1,171.45 km^{2} (452.30 sq mi)

Population (2024)
  - Total: 88,671
  - Density: 75.693/km^{2} (196.04/sq mi)
- Time zone: UTC+1 (CET)
  - Summer (DST): UTC+2 (CEST)
- Municipalities: 40
- * Cities and towns: 9
- * Market towns: 0

The administrative district of the municipality with extended powers of Karlovy Vary (abbreviated AD MEP Karlovy Vary; Czech: Správní obvod obce s rozšířenou působností Karlovy Vary, SO ORP Karlovy Vary) is an administrative district of municipality with extended powers in Karlovy Vary District in the Karlovy Vary Region of the Czech Republic. It has existed since 1 January 2003, when districts were replaced. It includes 40 municipalities and the Hradiště Military Training Area.

== Municipalities ==
Cities and towns are in bold.

Municipality	Population	Area (km^{2)}	Density
Andělská Hora	398	8.08	49
**Bečov nad Teplou**	919	19.82	46
**Bochov**	1,897	95.69	20
Božičany	641	7.66	84
Bražec	245	12.64	19
Březová	694	2.08	333
Černava	311	7.07	44
Chodov	124	8.16	15
**Chyše**	591	28.62	21
Čichalov	178	12.83	14
Dalovice	1,993	6.28	317
Děpoltovice	448	12.88	35
Hory	439	7.88	56
Jenišov	1,167	5.18	225
**Karlovy Vary**	49,353	59.08	840
Kolová	913	7.03	129
**Krásné Údolí**	390	9.16	43
Kyselka	846	6.52	129
Mírová	341	3.90	87
**Nejdek**	7,785	52.27	148
**Nová Role**	4,244	13.53	313
Nové Hamry	358	25.11	14
Otovice	1,027	4.41	232
Otročín	446	35.80	12
Pila	583	7.11	82
Pšov	604	48.70	12
Sadov	1,291	19.34	67
Šemnice	685	13.22	52
Smolné Pece	242	6.45	38
Stanovice	638	31.61	20
Štědrá	522	36.56	14
Stružná	626	12.62	50
Teplička	103	4.56	23
**Toužim**	3,492	98.55	35
Útvina	581	37.83	15
Valeč	336	23.66	14
Verušičky	469	24.78	19
Vrbice	201	7.66	26
Vysoká Pec	348	13.36	26
Žlutice	2,202	53.00	42

== Demographics ==
Historical population

Year	Pop.	±%
1869	90,461	—
1880	102,725	+13.6%
1890	109,722	+6.8%
1900	127,688	+16.4%
1910	142,297	+11.4%

Year	Pop.	±%
1921	138,647	−2.6%
1930	154,589	+11.5%
1950	79,593	−48.5%
1961	88,280	+10.9%
1970	92,157	+4.4%

Year	Pop.	±%
1980	95,486	+3.6%
1991	91,822	−3.8%
2001	90,333	−1.6%
2011	86,099	−4.7%
2021	81,840	−4.9%

Source: Censuses
