= Karlovy Vary agglomeration =

Area of the Czech Republic

Karlovy Vary agglomeration Karlovarská aglomerace
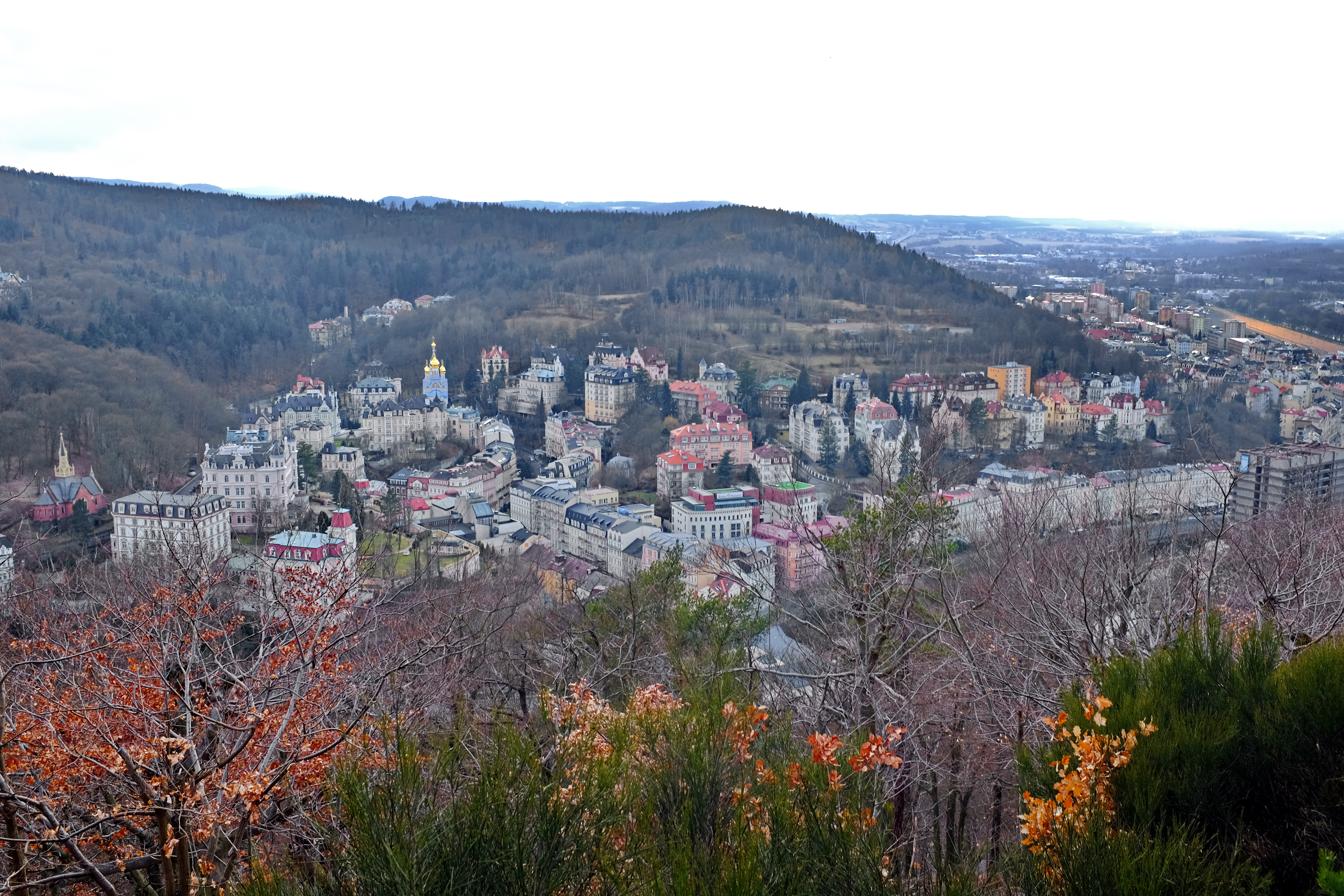
- View of Karlovy Vary
- Country: Czech Republic
- Region: Karlovy Vary
- Largest city: Karlovy Vary

Area
  - Total: 610 km^{2} (240 sq mi)

Population (2024)
  - Total: 138,355
  - Density: 230/km^{2} (590/sq mi)
- Time zone: UTC+1 (CET)
  - Summer (DST): UTC+2 (CEST)

The Karlovy Vary agglomeration (Czech: Karlovarská aglomerace) is the agglomeration of the city of Karlovy Vary and its surroundings in the Czech Republic. It was defined in 2020 as a tool for drawing money from the European Structural and Investment Funds and is valid in 2021–2027. The agglomeration also includes the towns of Sokolov and Ostrov and has a population of about 138,000.

== Definition ==
The Karlovy Vary agglomeration was defined in 2020 by the Ministry of Regional Development of the Czech Republic for the purposes of the so-called Integrated Territorial Investment (ITI), which is a tool for drawing money from the European Structural and Investment Funds.

The territory was defined on the basis of a coefficient composed of three methods: integrated system of centres (i.e. delineation of commuting flows based on mobile operator data from 2019), time spent in core cities (based on mobile operator data from 2019) and residential suburbanization zones (based on statistics of realized housing construction and directional migration from the core of the agglomeration to suburban municipalities in the period 2009–2016). The scope of the territory is valid for the period 2021–2027.

== Municipalities ==
The agglomeration includes 33 municipalities.

Name	Population (2024)
Andělská Hora	398
Bečov nad Teplou	919
Bochov	1,897
Božičany	641
Březová	694
Chodov	12,649
Dalovice	1,993
Děpoltovice	448
Hájek	643
Hory	439
Hroznětín	2,107
Jenišov	1,167
Karlovy Vary	49,353
Kolová	913
Krásný Les	347
Kyselka	846
Loket	3,071
Mírová	341
Nejdek	7,785
Nová Role	4,244
Nové Sedlo	2,557
Ostrov	15,825
Otovice	1,027
Pila	583
Sadov	1,291
Šemnice	685
Smolné Pece	242
Sokolov	22,155
Stanovice	638
Stružná	626
Teplička	103
Velichov	496
Vintířov	1,232
Total	138,355
