= Bražec =

- Municipality
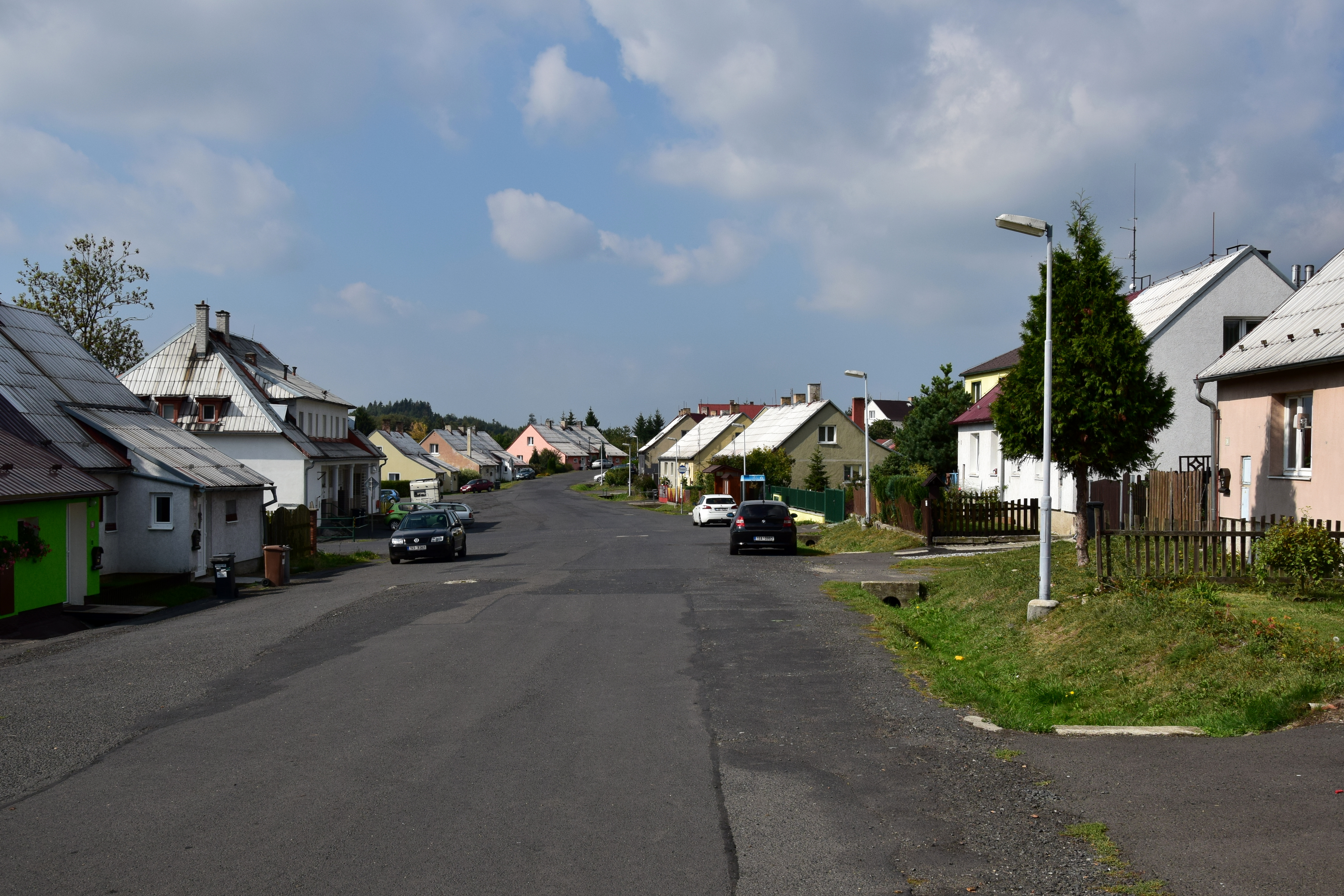
- Main street

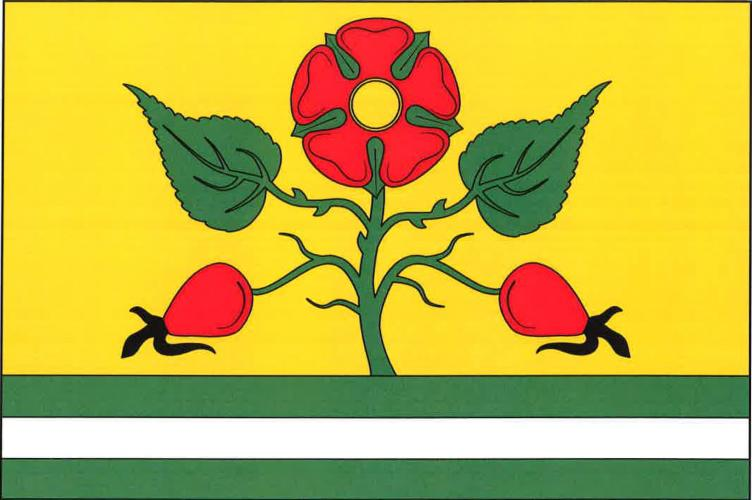
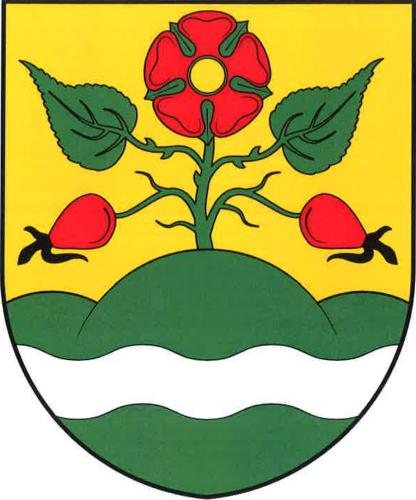
- Flag Coat of arms

- Location in the Czech Republic
- Coordinates: 50°10′26″N 13°2′47″E
- Country: Czech Republic
- Region: Karlovy Vary
- District: Karlovy Vary
- First mentioned: 1289

Area
  - Total: 12.64 km^{2} (4.88 sq mi)
- Elevation: 765 m (2,510 ft)

Population (2026-01-01)
  - Total: 264
  - Density: 20.9/km^{2} (54.1/sq mi)
- Time zone: UTC+1 (CET)
  - Summer (DST): UTC+2 (CEST)
- Postal code: 364 71
- Website: www.brazec.cz

Bražec (German: Bergles) is a municipality and village in Karlovy Vary District in the Karlovy Vary Region of the Czech Republic. It has about 300 inhabitants.

== Administrative division ==
Bražec consists of three municipal parts (in brackets population according to the 2021 census):

- Bražec (207)
- Dolní Valov (5)
- Javorná (0)

== Etymology ==
The name Bražec is a diminutive of the Old Czech word brah, which meant 'pile', 'pit'.

== Geography ==
Bražec is located about 13 kilometres (8 mi) southeast of Karlovy Vary. Most of the municipal territory lies in the Doupov Mountains, only the western part lies in the Slavkov Forest. The highest point is a hill at 793 m (2,602 ft) above sea level.

== History ==
The first written mention of Bražec is from 1289. Until 1410, the village was owned by a local noble family, who called themselves Lords of Bražec. Bražec then often changed owners. From 1581 to 1622, it was part of the Andělská Hora estate. In 1622, Bražec was acquired by the Czernin family. Since then, the village was part of the Stružná estate, which remained so until the establishment of an independent municipality in 1848.

In 1953, the Military Training Area Hradiště was created, which caused the eviction of 65 villages and the demise of several municipalities including Bražec. The municipality was then created again on 1 January 2016 by diminishing of the military area.

== Demographics ==
Historical population

Year	Pop.	±%
1869	778	—
1880	851	+9.4%
1890	753	−11.5%
1900	779	+3.5%
1910	840	+7.8%

Year	Pop.	±%
1921	771	−8.2%
1930	687	−10.9%
1950	233	−66.1%
1961	0	−100.0%
1970	0	0.00%

Year	Pop.	±%
1980	0	0.00%
1991	0	0.00%
2001	269	—
2011	219	−18.6%
2021	212	−3.2%

Source: Censuses

== Transport ==
There are no railways or major roads running through the municipality.

== Sights ==
The only protected cultural monument in the municipality are the relics of a fortified medieval fortress. The location is an archaeological site, explored in 1986–1989.
