= Otovice =

Otovice may refer to places in the Czech Republic:

- Otovice (Karlovy Vary District), a municipality and village in the Karlovy Vary Region
- Otovice (Náchod District), a municipality and village in the Hradec Králové Region
