= Herbert Zimmermann (neuroscientist) =

German neuroscientist (born 1944)

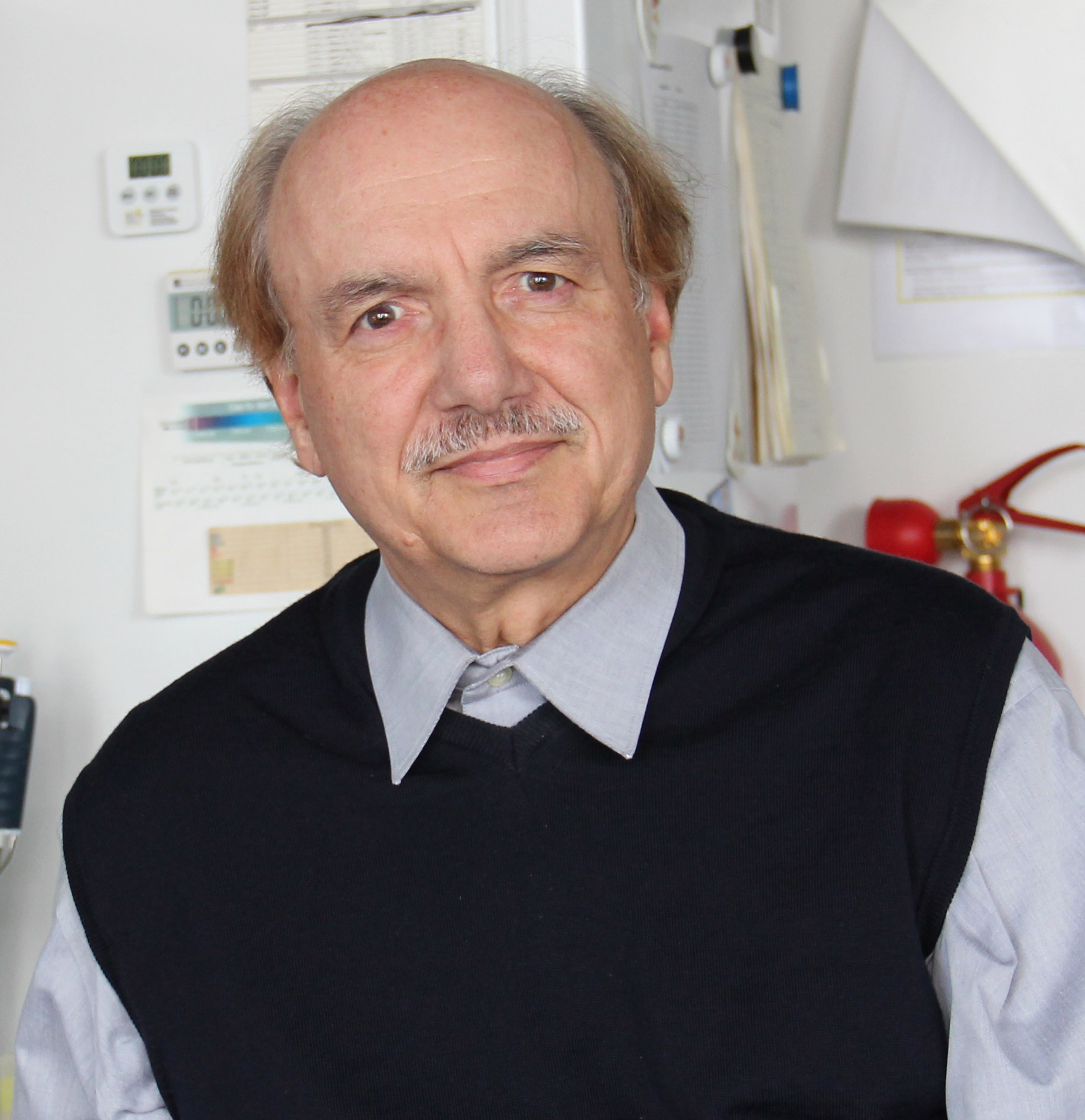
- Herbert Zimmermann
- Born: 10 January 1944 (age 82); Chiesch/Chyše, Nazi Germany (modern-day Czech Republic)
- Known for: Characterization of the biochemical and structural heterogeneity of synaptic vesicle pools and the biochemical and molecular characterization of ectonucleotidases
- Scientific career
- Fields: Neurobiochemistry, Synaptic Transmission and Purinergic Signalling

Herbert Zimmermann (born 10 January 1944) is a German neuroscientist who pioneered the studies on the biochemical, structural and functional heterogeneity of cholinergic synaptic vesicles from the electric organ of the electric ray Torpedo, and the functional and biochemical characterization of enzymes hydrolyzing extracellular nucleotides.

== Biography ==
Herbert Zimmermann was born in Chiesch (now Chyše, Czech Republic). He studied chemistry and biology at LMU Munich (1964–69) and obtained his PhD at the University of Regensburg in 1971. From 1972 to 1973, he continued as postdoctoral fellow at the Department of Biochemistry at the University of Cambridge, UK. From 1973 to 1979, he was scientist and senior scientist at the Department of Neurochemistry of the Max Planck Institute for Biophysical Chemistry in Göttingen (Germany). From 1980 to 1983, he held the position of Professor of Neurobiology at the University of Oldenburg (Germany). In 1983, he was appointed chair and section leader of Neurochemistry at Goethe University Frankfurt (Germany). In 1987, he was visiting professor at the Institute of Brain Research of the Medical Faculty of the Tokyo University (Tokyo Daigaku). From 1991 to 1995 he was elected president of the German Neuroscience Society. 2008 he was elected president of the German Purine Club. After his retirement (2010) he continued as emeritus in the Department of Molecular and Cellular Neurobiology of Goethe University Frankfurt. Since 2009, he is president of the Scientific Society at the Johann Wolfgang Goethe-University Frankfurt am Main.

== Research ==
Zimmermann's initial studies at LMU Munich and the University of Regensburg under the supervision of Helmut Altner addressed a circumventricular organ specific for fishes, the saccus vasculosus. In Cambridge, in the laboratory of Victor P. Whittaker, he began his studies on the dynamics of the synaptic vesicle compartment. He used the electric ray electric organ that is homologous to the neuromuscular junction as a model system for cholinergic synaptic transmission. This system permitted parallel electrophysiological stimulation and recording and electron microscopic and in particular biochemical analysis of the outcome of the synaptic activation on the synaptic vesicle compartment. He showed that nerve stimulation induces both morphological and biochemical heterogeneity of synaptic vesicles. Vesicles that had gone through at least one cycle of exo- and endocytosis where reduced in size, could be separated by density centrifugation or chromatography on porous glass beads and were preferentially refilled with newly synthesized acetylcholine and ATP. This was in contrast to the reserve pool of synaptic vesicles that was not yet involved in the transmission process. The data suggested that synaptic activation induces synaptic vesicle heterogeneity whereby reloaded synaptic vesicles preferentially release newly synthesized acetylcholine and ATP. They provided a cell biological explanation for a previously unresolved problem in the earlier history of neurotransmission, namely that newly synthesized acetylcholine is preferentially released from stimulated nerve endings. He further showed that ATP released from the electric nerves is hydrolyzed extracellularly to adenosine that is recycled via a high affinity transport mechanism into the nerve terminals where it is rephosphorylated and taken up in the form of ATP into synaptic vesicles. Starting from the observation that ATP is hydrolyzed extracellularly he analyzed the biochemical pathways leading to the extracellular breakdown of released nucleotides to their respective nucleosides. This resulted in the isolation and molecular cloning of the AMP-hydrolyzing enzyme ecto-5'-nucleotidase as well as of a number of the nucleoside triphosphate and diphosphate-hydrolyzing enzymes of the family of the ectonucleoside triphosphate diphosphohydrolases. He also initiated a new nomenclature for these enzymes and for the ectopyrophosphatase/phosphodiesterases. More recently he analyzed the proteome of synaptic vesicles and the role of nucleotide signaling in the control of adult neurogenesis, the formation of new neurons in the adult mammalian brain.

== Awards ==
- 2006: Geoffrey Burnstock Lecture, Ferrara, Italy
- 2007: Elected to Correspondent Academician of the Real Academia Nacional de Farmacia, Spain
- 2009: Elected to Academia Europaea
- 2013: Giuliana Fassina Award of the Italian Purine Club

== Selected publications ==
- Altner, H, Zimmermann, H. (1972) "The saccus vasculosus" In: The Structure and Function of Nervous Tissue, Vol. V. Bourne E.G. (Ed.) Academic Press, New York and London. Ch. 19, pp 293–328 ISBN 0-19-508293-1.
- Zimmermann, H.; Denston, C.R. (1977). "Recycling of synaptic vesicles in the cholinergic synapses of the Torpedo electric organ during induced transmitter release". Neuroscience. 2 (5): 695–714. doi:10.1016/0306-4522(77)90024-0. PMID 22832. S2CID 40640580.
- Zimmermann, H.; Whittaker, V.P. (1977). "Morphological and biochemical heterogeneity of cholinergic synaptic vesicles". Nature. 267 (5612): 633–635. Bibcode:1977Natur.267..633Z. doi:10.1038/267633a0. PMID 876386. S2CID 4257576.
- Zimmermann, H. (1978). "Turnover of adenine nucleotides in cholinergic synaptic vesicles of the Torpedo electric organ". Neuroscience. 3 (9): 827–836. doi:10.1016/0306-4522(78)90035-0. PMID 714254. S2CID 24567009.
- Zimmermann, H.; Dowdall, M.J.; Lane, D.A. (1979). "Purine salvage at the cholinergic nerve endings of the Torpedo electric organ: the central role of adenosine". Neuroscience. 4 (7): 979–993. doi:10.1016/0306-4522(79)90181-7. PMID 552616. S2CID 309550.
- Zimmermann, H. (1979). "Vesicle recycling and transmitter release". Neuroscience. 4 (12): 1773–1804. doi:10.1016/0306-4522(79)90058-7. PMID 43485. S2CID 33010785.
- Zimmermann, H. (1979). "On the vesicle hypothesis". Trends Neurosci. 2: 282–285. doi:10.1016/0166-2236(79)90111-5. S2CID 54379989.
- Kreutzberg, G.W., Reddington, M., Zimmermann, H. (eds.) (1986) Cellular Biology of Ectoenzymes. Springer Verlag, Berlin, Heidelberg, New York, Tokyo. ISBN 3-540-15746-8
- Grondal, E.J.M.; Zimmermann, H. (1987). "Purification, characterization and cellular localization of 5'-nucleotidase from Torpedo electric organ". Biochemical Journal. 245 (3): 805–810. doi:10.1042/bj2450805. PMC 1148201. PMID 2822031.
- Volknandt, W.; Vogel, M.; Pevsner, J.; Misumi, Y.; Ikehara, Y.; Zimmermann, H. (1991). "5'-nucleotidase from the electric ray electric lobe. Primary structure and relation to mammalian and procaryotic enzymes". Biochem. J. 202 (3): 855–861. doi:10.1111/j.1432-1033.1991.tb16443.x. PMID 1765099.
- Zimmermann, H. (1993) Synaptic Transmission. Cellular and Molecular Basis. Thieme/Oxford, University Press, ISBN 0-19-521065-4.
- Kegel, B.; Braun, N.; Heine, P.; Maliszewski, C.R.; Zimmermann, H. (1997). "An ecto-ATPase and an ecto-ATP diphosphohydrolase are expressed in brain". Neuropharmacology. 36 (9): 1189–1200. doi:10.1016/s0028-3908(97)00115-9. PMID 9364474. S2CID 9941809.
- Illes, P., Zimmermann H. (eds.) (1999) Nucleotides and their Receptors in the Nervous System. Elesevier, Amsterdam, New York, Oxford, Tokyo.
- Braun, N.; Fengler, S.; Ebeling, C.; Servos, J.; Zimmermann, H. (2000). "Sequencing, functional expression and characterization of rat NTPDase6, a nucleoside diphosphatase and novel member of the ecto-nucleoside triphosphate diphosphohydrolase family". Biochem. J. 351 (3): 639–647. doi:10.1042/0264-6021:3510639. PMC 1221403. PMID 11042118.
- Mishra, S.K.; Braun, N.; Shukla, V.; Füllgrabe, M.; Schomerus, C.; Korf, H.-W.; Gachet, C.; -Ikehara, S.C.; Sévigny, Y.; Robson, Simon C.; Zimmermann, Herbert (2006). "Extracellular nucleotide signaling in adult neural stem cells: synergism with growth factor-mediated cellular proliferation". Development. 133 (4): 675–684. doi:10.1242/dev.02233. PMID 16436623. S2CID 19978427.
- Burré, J.; Beckhaus, T.; Schägger, H.; Corvey, C.; Hofmann, S.; Karas, M.; Zimmermann, H.; Volknandt, W. (2006). "Analysis of the synaptic vesicle proteome using three gel-based protein separation techniques". Proteomics. 6 (23): 6250–6262. doi:10.1002/pmic.200600357. PMID 17080482. S2CID 24340148.
