= Chyše =

- Town
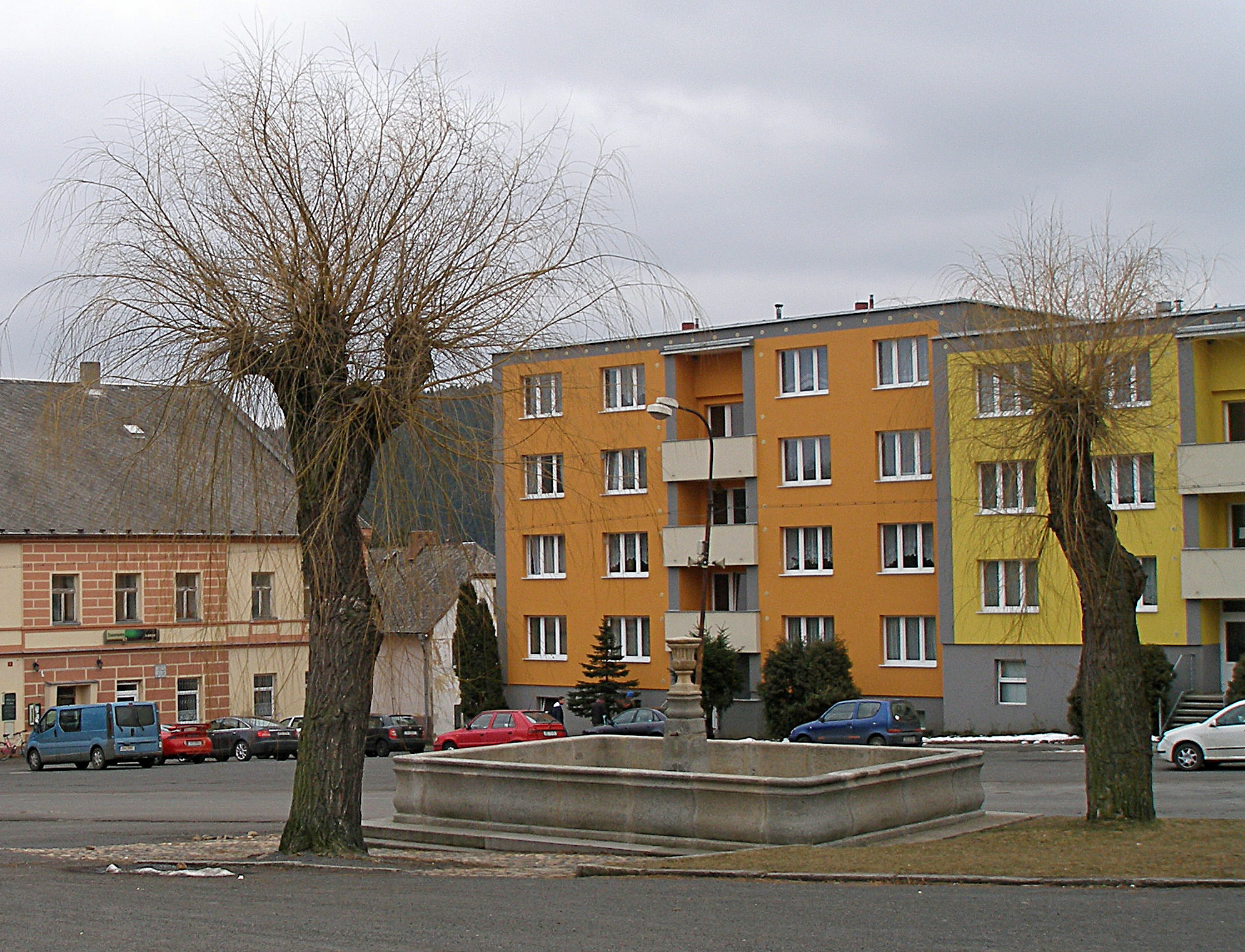
- Town square

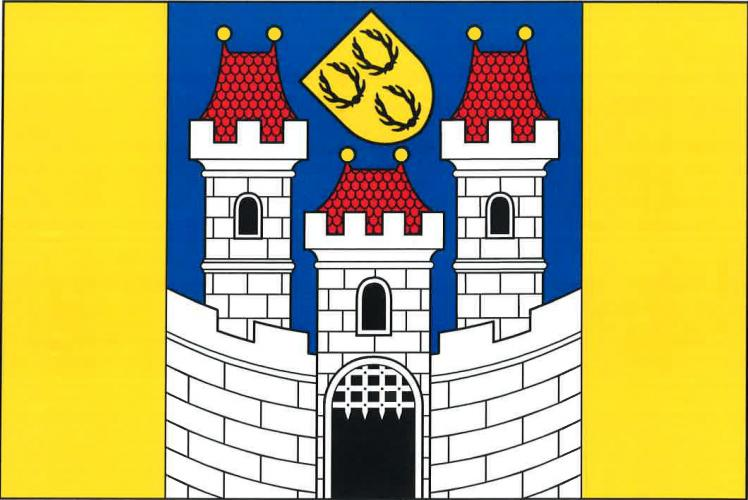
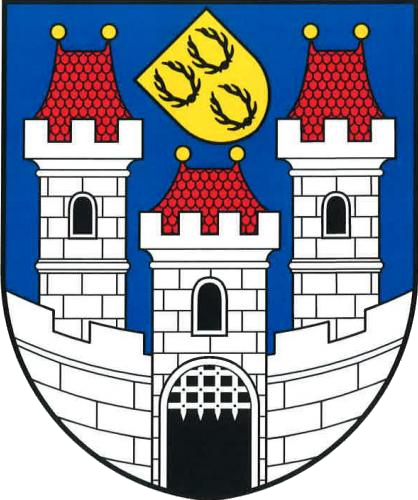
- Flag Coat of arms

- Location in the Czech Republic
- Coordinates: 50°6′45″N 13°14′53″E
- Country: Czech Republic
- Region: Karlovy Vary
- District: Karlovy Vary
- First mentioned: 1169

Government
  - Mayor: Miroslav Dorňák

Area
  - Total: 28.62 km^{2} (11.05 sq mi)
- Elevation: 458 m (1,503 ft)

Population (2026-01-01)
  - Total: 586
  - Density: 20.5/km^{2} (53.0/sq mi)
- Time zone: UTC+1 (CET)
  - Summer (DST): UTC+2 (CEST)
- Postal code: 364 53
- Website: www.mestochyse.cz

Chyše (Czech pronunciation: [ˈxɪʃɛ]; German: Chiesch) is a town in Karlovy Vary District in the Karlovy Vary Region of the Czech Republic. It has about 600 inhabitants.

== Administrative division ==
Chyše consists of 11 municipal parts (in brackets population according to the 2021 census):

- Chyše (461)
- Chýšky (6)
- Čichořice (9)
- Číhání (0)
- Dvorec (0)
- Jablonná (10)
- Luby (7)
- Podštěly (25)
- Poříčí (4)
- Radotín (19)
- Žďárek (11)

== Etymology ==
The name Chyše means 'hut', 'shack'. Throughout history, the spelling of the town's name has alternated between Chyše and Chýše.

== Geography ==
Chyše is located about 30 kilometres (19 mi) southeast of Karlovy Vary. The built-up area lies in the eastern tip of the Teplá Highlands, but most of the municipal territory lies in the Rakovník Uplands. The highest point is at 607 m (1,991 ft) above sea level. The town is situated on the left bank of the Střela River.

== History ==
The first written mention of Chyše is from 1169, when a fortress was documented here. For 200 years, it was owned by the Lords of Odolenovice.

According to the census of 1921, 93% of the population were Germans, 6% Czechoslovaks and 1% foreigners. The vast majority of the inhabitants were Roman Catholics, complemented by 20 Jews, six Protestants and three people without religion.

From 1938 to 1945, Chyše was occupied by Nazi Germany and administered as part of the Reichsgau Sudetenland. After World War II, the town was returned to Czechoslovakia and the local German-speaking population was expelled.

== Demographics ==
Historical population

Year	Pop.	±%
1869	2,270	—
1880	2,370	+4.4%
1890	2,086	−12.0%
1900	2,051	−1.7%
1910	1,988	−3.1%

Year	Pop.	±%
1921	1,807	−9.1%
1930	1,851	+2.4%
1950	987	−46.7%
1961	885	−10.3%
1970	826	−6.7%

Year	Pop.	±%
1980	695	−15.9%
1991	646	−7.1%
2001	586	−9.3%
2011	567	−3.2%
2021	552	−2.6%

Source: Censuses

== Transport ==
Chyše is located on the railway line Rakovník–Bečov nad Teplou.

== Culture ==
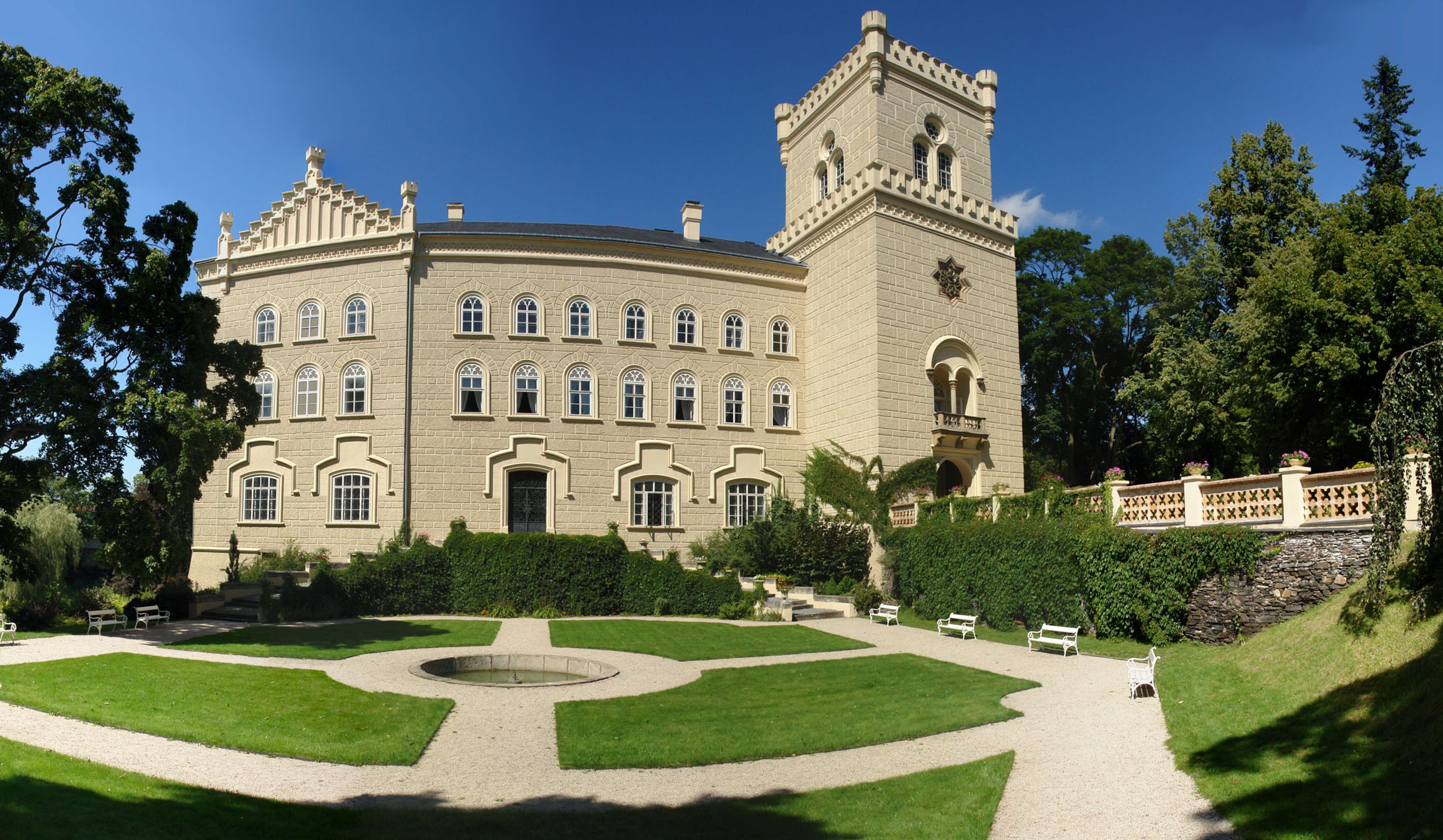
Chyše Castle

In 2022, 2023 and 2024, an annual meeting of micronations, known as the Micro Euro Summit, took place in Chyše Castle.

== Sights ==
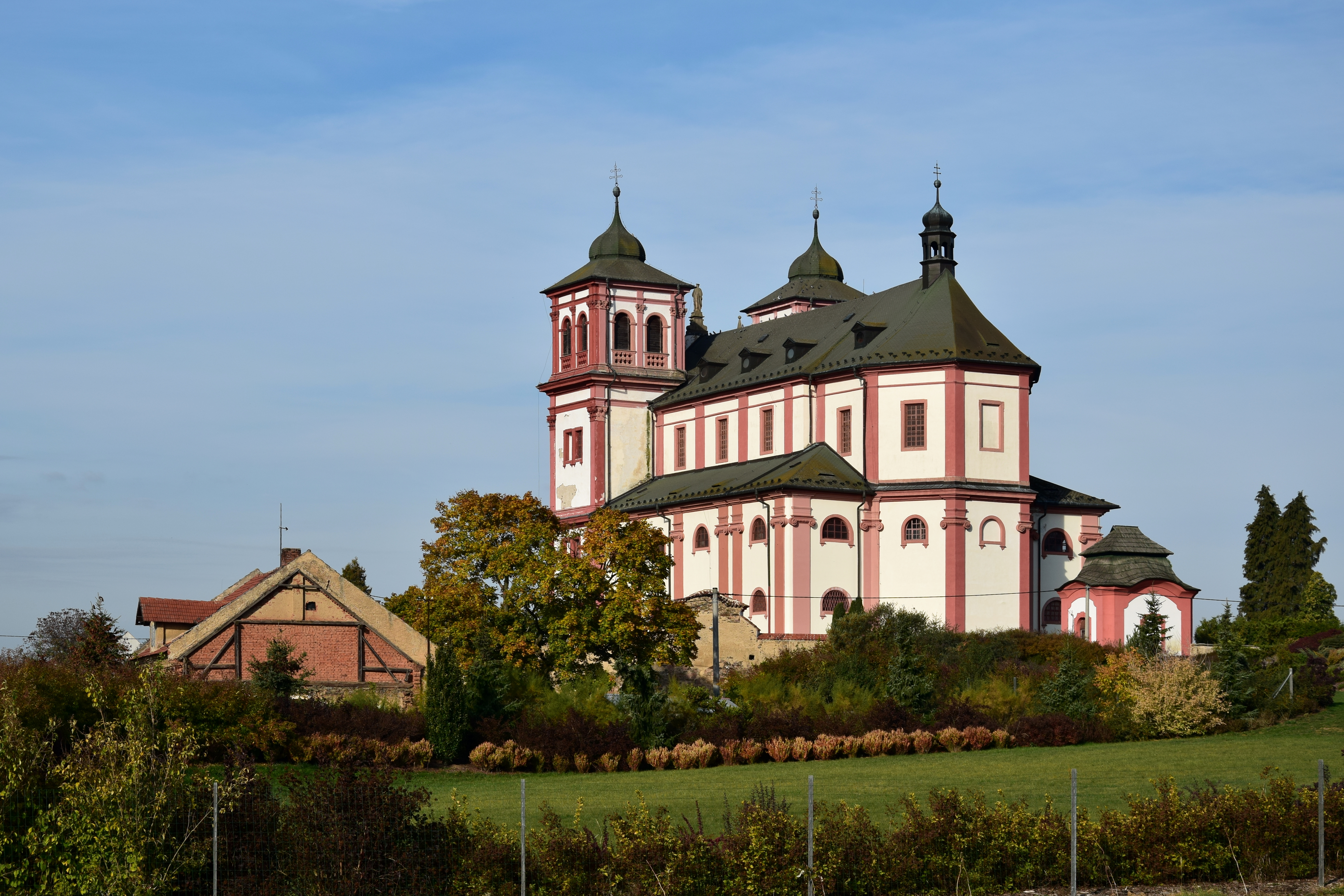
Church of the Exaltation of the Holy Cross

The main landmark of the town is the Chyše Castle. The old fortress was rebuilt into a Gothic castle, then it was rebuilt into a Renaissance residence in 1578. The Baroque modifications were made in 1695–1708. The current appearance is a result of the neo-Gothic reconstruction in 1856–1858. Today the castle is open to the public. A rare ceiling painting by Petr Brandl on the vault of one of the castle's representative salons dates from 1699.

The Church of the Name of the Virgin Mary and the Carmelite monastery were originally late Gothic buildings from the 15th century. After they were almost completely destroyed by a fire in 1687, they were rebuilt in the early Baroque style. The interior of the church is decorated with paintings by Petr Brandl.

A notable building is the Church of the Exaltation of the Holy Cross. It is an early Baroque cemetery church from 1710, which replaced an older Gothic church.

Only a few fragments have survived from the medieval fortifications.

== Notable people ==
- Angelika Campbell, Countess Cawdor (born 1944), Czech-British horticulturist
- Herbert Zimmermann (born 1944), German neuroscientist
