= Mírová =

- Municipality
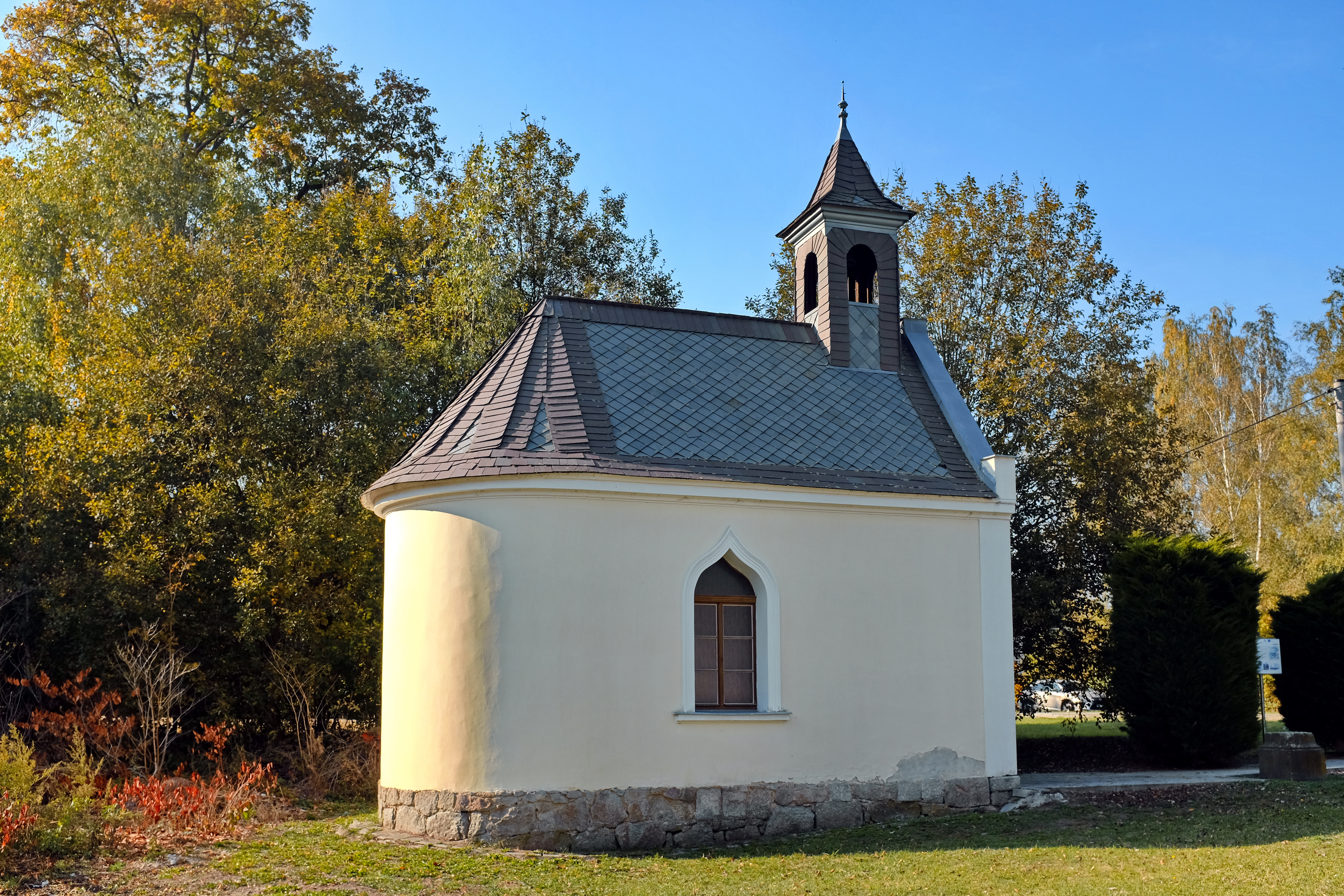
- Chapel in the village

- Flag Coat of arms

- Location in the Czech Republic
- Coordinates: 50°14′14″N 12°46′12″E
- Country: Czech Republic
- Region: Karlovy Vary
- District: Karlovy Vary
- First mentioned: 1437

Area
  - Total: 3.90 km^{2} (1.51 sq mi)
- Elevation: 414 m (1,358 ft)

Population (2026-01-01)
  - Total: 382
  - Density: 97.9/km^{2} (254/sq mi)
- Time zone: UTC+1 (CET)
  - Summer (DST): UTC+2 (CEST)
- Postal code: 357 35
- Website: www.obec-mirova.cz

Mírová (until 1955 Mnichov; German: Münchhof) is a municipality and village in Karlovy Vary District in the Karlovy Vary Region of the Czech Republic. It has about 400 inhabitants.

== Demographics ==
Historical population
Year	Pop.	±%
1869	409	—
1880	527	+28.9%
1890	681	+29.2%
1900	790	+16.0%
1910	721	−8.7%
1921	741	+2.8%
1930	989	+33.5%
1950	445	−55.0%
1961	344	−22.7%
1970	313	−9.0%
1980	239	−23.6%
1991	213	−10.9%
2001	224	+5.2%
2011	311	+38.8%
2021	321	+3.2%
Source: Censuses
