= Teplička (Karlovy Vary District) =

- Municipality
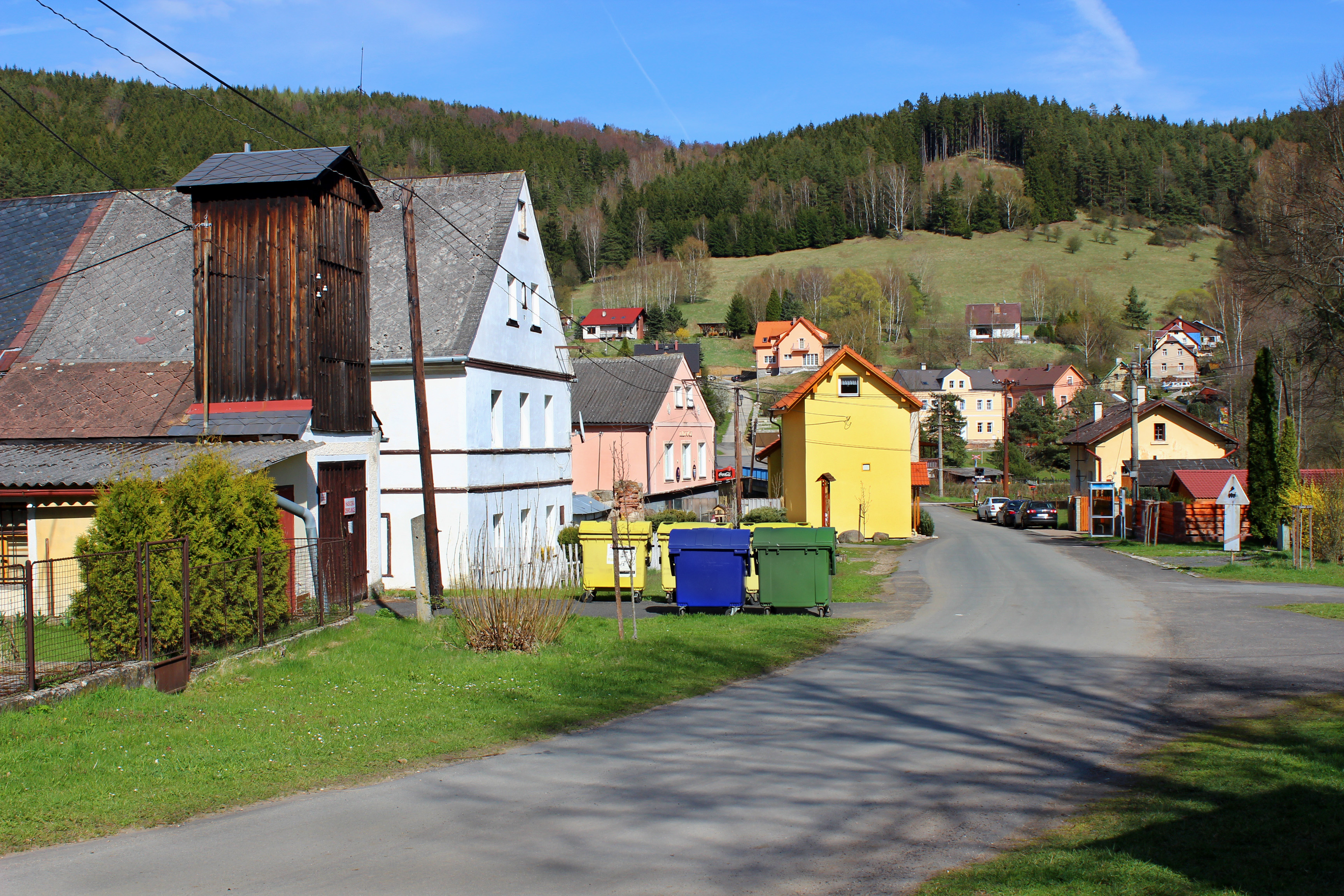
- Centre of Teplička

- Flag Coat of arms

- Location in the Czech Republic
- Coordinates: 50°8′55″N 12°51′6″E
- Country: Czech Republic
- Region: Karlovy Vary
- District: Karlovy Vary
- First mentioned: 1475

Area
  - Total: 4.56 km^{2} (1.76 sq mi)
- Elevation: 457 m (1,499 ft)

Population (2026-01-01)
  - Total: 103
  - Density: 22.6/km^{2} (58.5/sq mi)
- Time zone: UTC+1 (CET)
  - Summer (DST): UTC+2 (CEST)
- Postal code: 364 64
- Website: www.teplicka.cz

Teplička (German: Töpeles) is a municipality and village in Karlovy Vary District in the Karlovy Vary Region of the Czech Republic. It has about 100 inhabitants.

== History ==
The first written mention of Teplička is from 1475.

== Demographics ==
Historical population
Year	Pop.	±%
1869	277	—
1880	315	+13.7%
1890	324	+2.9%
1900	386	+19.1%
1910	384	−0.5%
1921	383	−0.3%
1930	408	+6.5%
1950	148	−63.7%
1961	151	+2.0%
1970	107	−29.1%
1980	81	−24.3%
1991	73	−9.9%
2001	74	+1.4%
2011	98	+32.4%
2021	113	+15.3%
Source: Censuses
