= Děpoltovice =

- Municipality
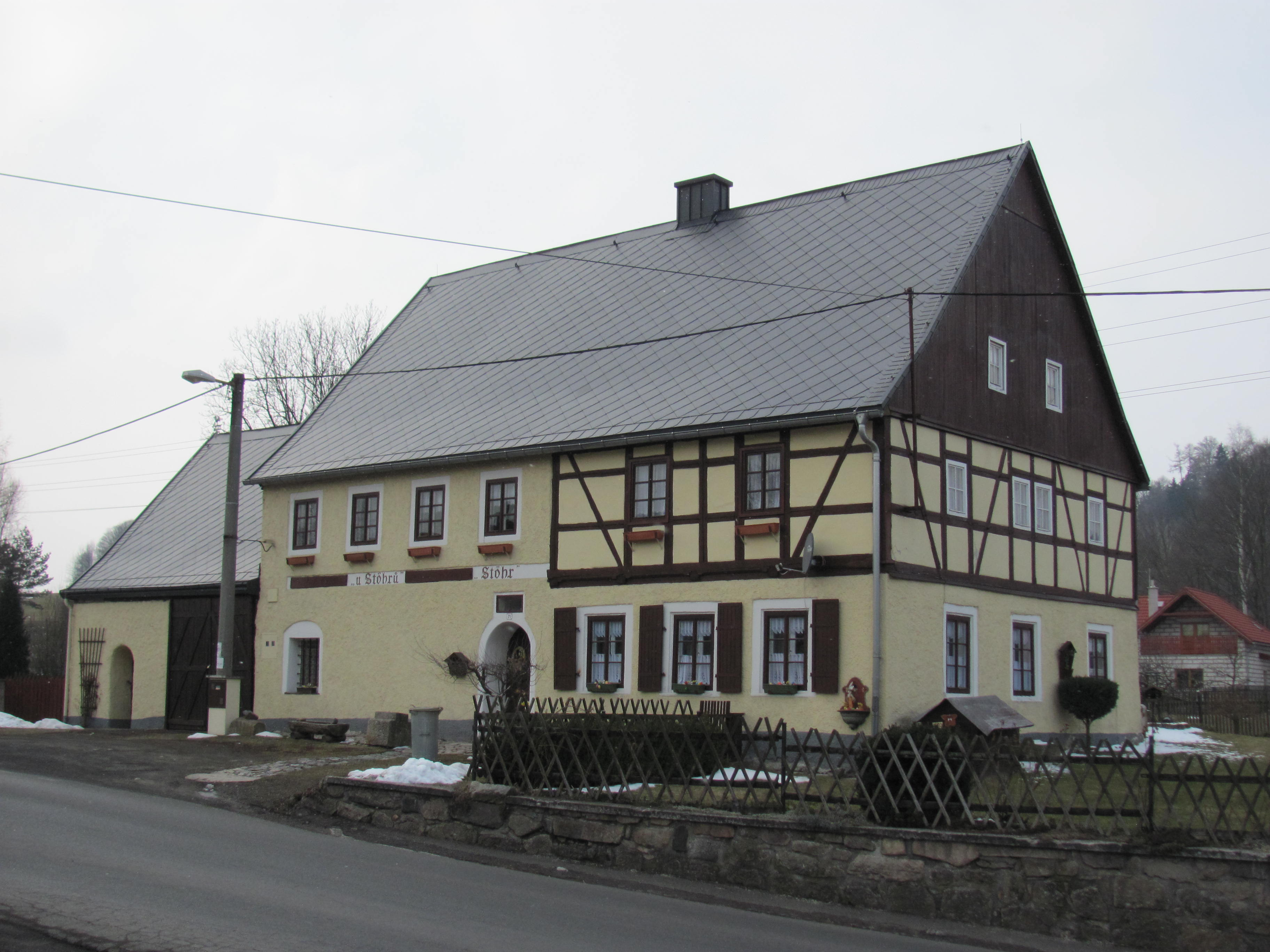
- Half-timbered building of a pub

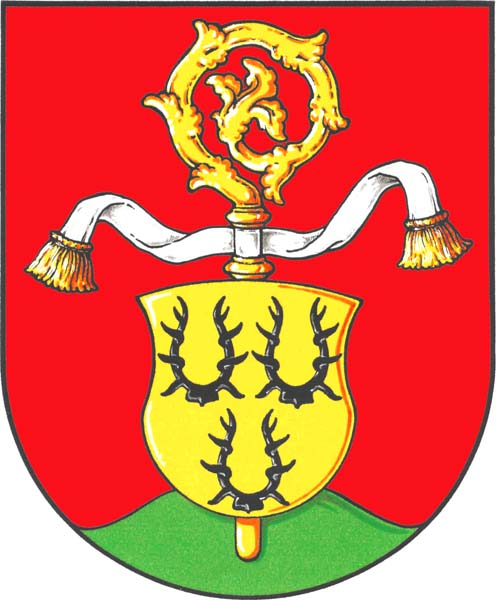
- Flag Coat of arms

- Location in the Czech Republic
- Coordinates: 50°17′41″N 12°48′50″E
- Country: Czech Republic
- Region: Karlovy Vary
- District: Karlovy Vary
- First mentioned: 1273

Area
  - Total: 12.88 km^{2} (4.97 sq mi)
- Elevation: 492 m (1,614 ft)

Population (2026-01-01)
  - Total: 466
  - Density: 36.2/km^{2} (93.7/sq mi)
- Time zone: UTC+1 (CET)
  - Summer (DST): UTC+2 (CEST)
- Postal code: 362 25
- Website: www.obecdepoltovice.cz

Děpoltovice (German: Tüppelsgrün) is a municipality and village in Karlovy Vary District in the Karlovy Vary Region of the Czech Republic. It has about 500 inhabitants.

== Administrative division ==
Děpoltovice consists of two municipal parts (in brackets population according to the 2021 census):

- Děpoltovice (309)
- Nivy (103)

== Demographics ==
Historical population
Year	Pop.	±%
1869	717	—
1880	753	+5.0%
1890	845	+12.2%
1900	924	+9.3%
1910	992	+7.4%
1921	862	−13.1%
1930	923	+7.1%
1950	389	−57.9%
1961	391	+0.5%
1970	315	−19.4%
1980	263	−16.5%
1991	206	−21.7%
2001	291	+41.3%
2011	368	+26.5%
2021	412	+12.0%
Source: Censuses
