= Božičany =

Municipality in the Czech Republic

- Municipality
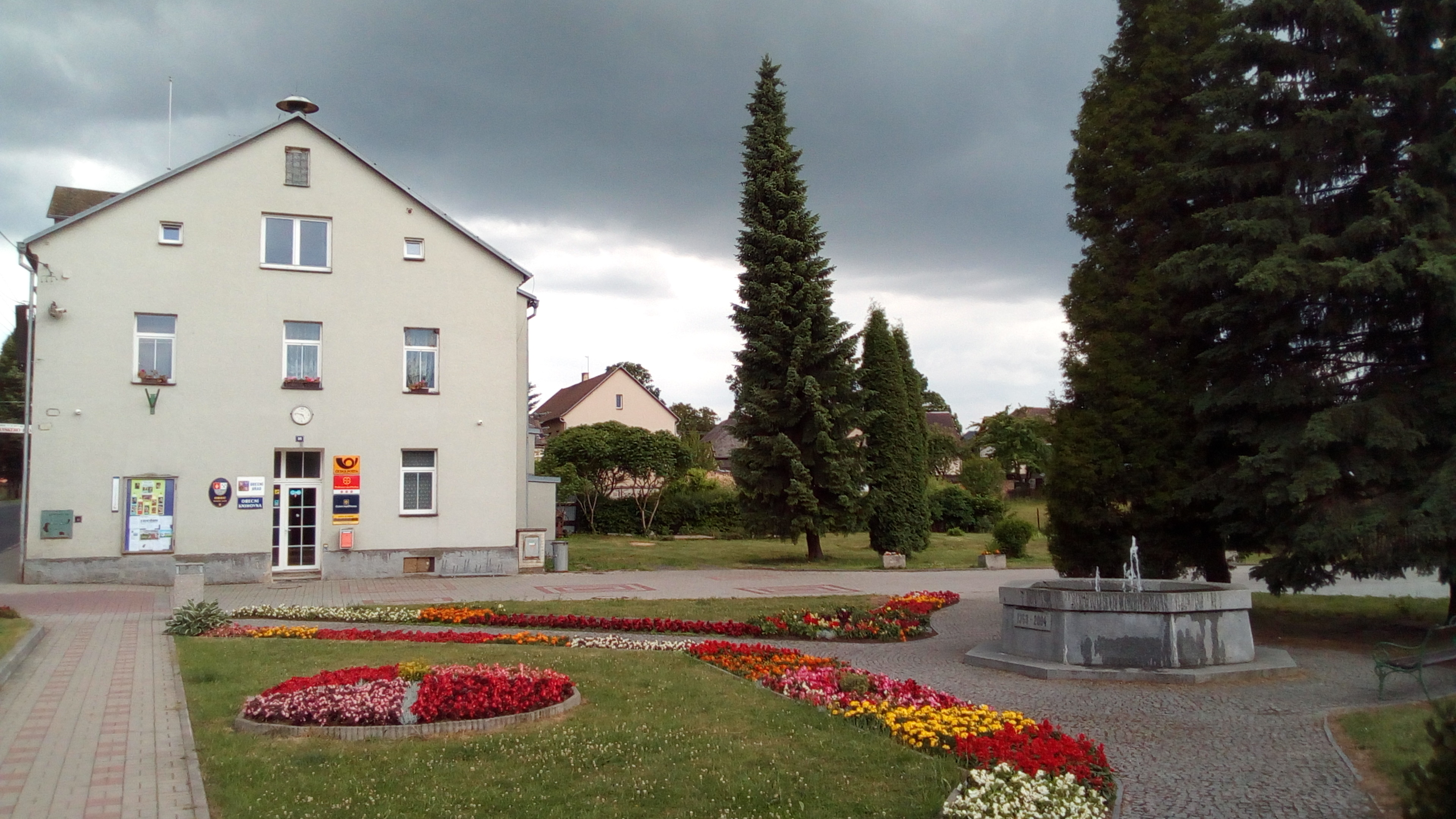
- Square in front of the municipal office

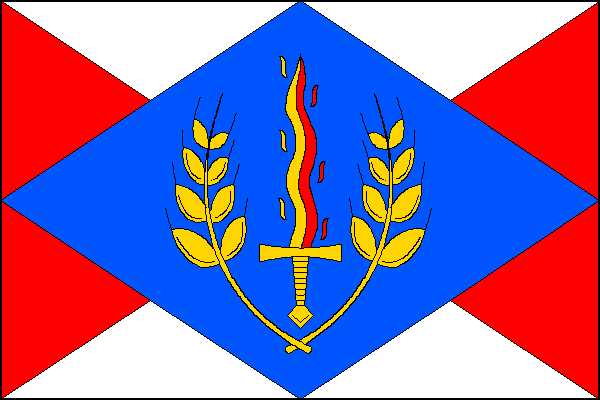
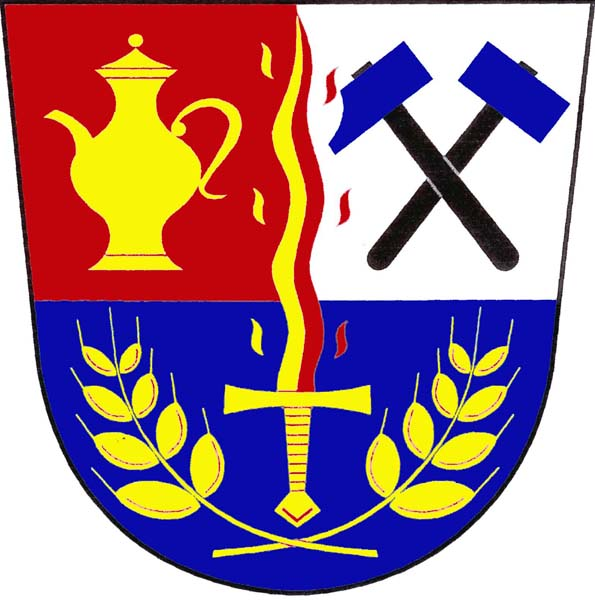
- Flag Coat of arms

- Location in the Czech Republic
- Coordinates: 50°15′29″N 12°46′8″E
- Country: Czech Republic
- Region: Karlovy Vary
- District: Karlovy Vary
- First mentioned: 1359

Area
  - Total: 7.66 km^{2} (2.96 sq mi)
- Elevation: 424 m (1,391 ft)

Population (2026-01-01)
  - Total: 589
  - Density: 76.9/km^{2} (199/sq mi)
- Time zone: UTC+1 (CET)
  - Summer (DST): UTC+2 (CEST)
- Postal code: 362 26
- Website: www.bozicany.cz

Božičany (German: Poschetzau) is a municipality and village in Karlovy Vary District in the Karlovy Vary Region of the Czech Republic. It has about 600 inhabitants.

== Demographics ==
Historical population
Year	Pop.	±%
1869	370	—
1880	412	+11.4%
1890	469	+13.8%
1900	991	+111.3%
1910	1,180	+19.1%
1921	1,062	−10.0%
1930	1,219	+14.8%
1950	800	−34.4%
1961	654	−18.2%
1970	590	−9.8%
1980	650	+10.2%
1991	569	−12.5%
2001	631	+10.9%
2011	593	−6.0%
2021	604	+1.9%
Source: Censuses
