= Pila (Karlovy Vary District) =

- Municipality
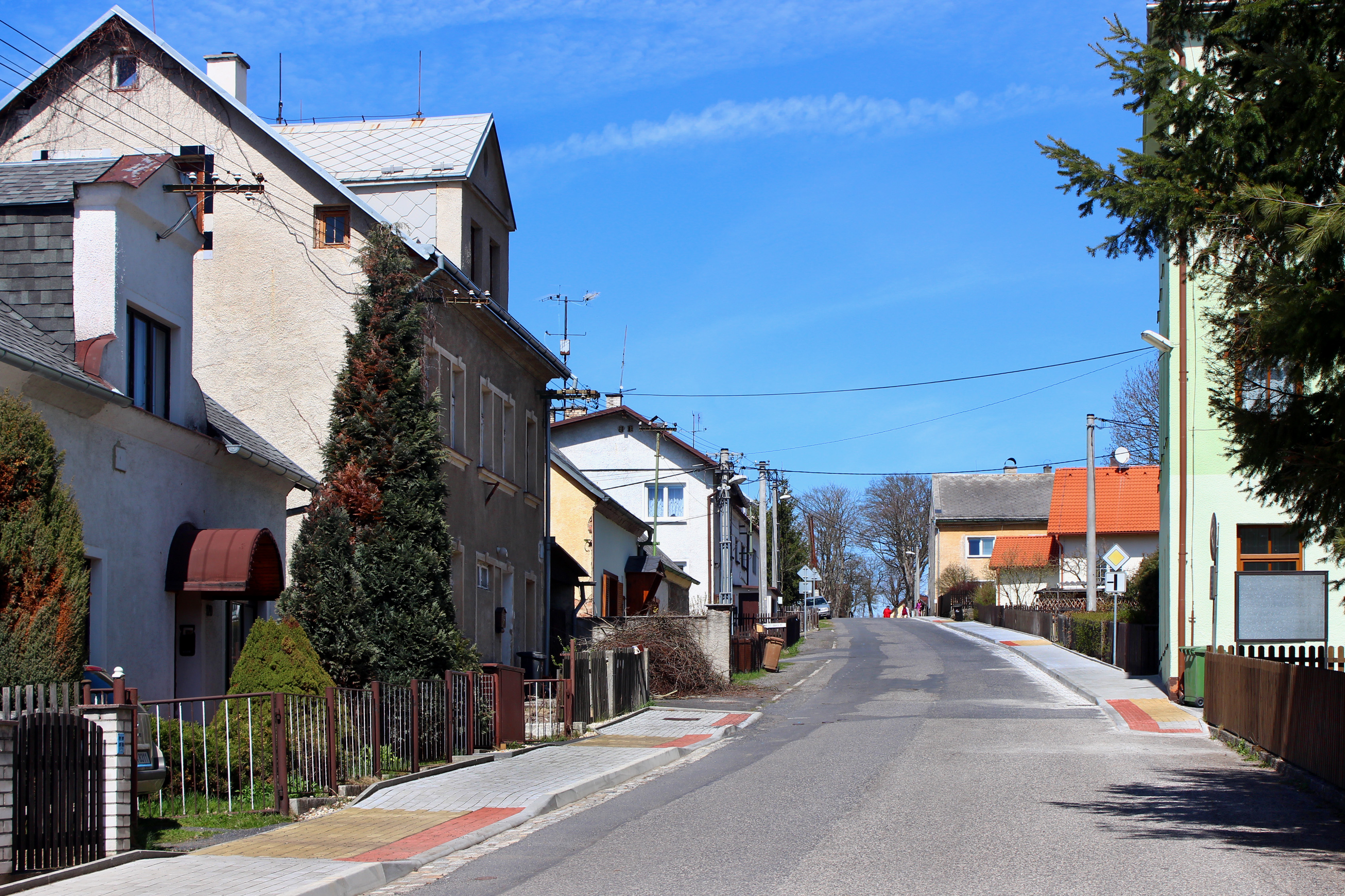
- Upper part of Pila

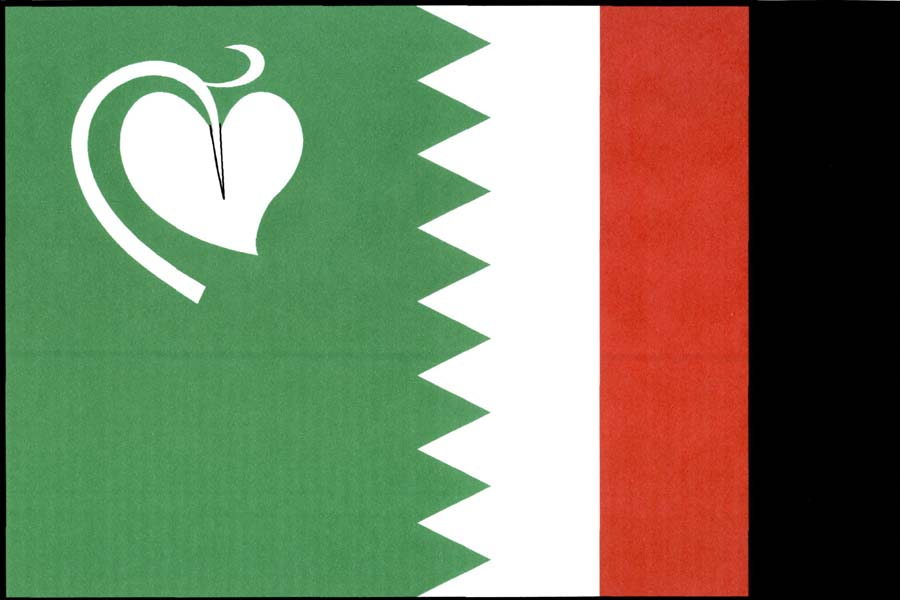
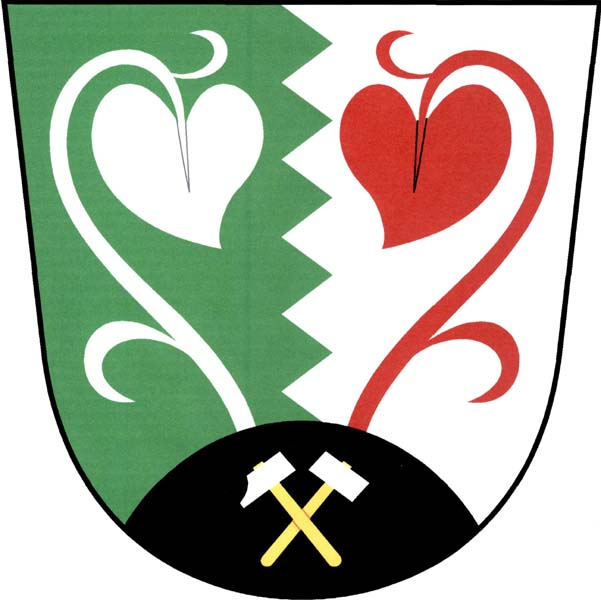
- Flag Coat of arms

- Location in the Czech Republic
- Coordinates: 50°10′47″N 12°55′33″E
- Country: Czech Republic
- Region: Karlovy Vary
- District: Karlovy Vary
- First mentioned: 1721

Area
  - Total: 7.11 km^{2} (2.75 sq mi)
- Elevation: 550 m (1,800 ft)

Population (2026-01-01)
  - Total: 573
  - Density: 80.6/km^{2} (209/sq mi)
- Time zone: UTC+1 (CET)
  - Summer (DST): UTC+2 (CEST)
- Postal code: 360 01
- Website: www.obec-pila.cz

Pila (German: Schneidmühl) is a municipality and village in Karlovy Vary District in the Karlovy Vary Region of the Czech Republic. It has about 600 inhabitants.

== Demographics ==
Historical population
Year	Pop.	±%
1869	674	—
1880	775	+15.0%
1890	697	−10.1%
1900	725	+4.0%
1910	857	+18.2%
1921	803	−6.3%
1930	829	+3.2%
1950	456	−45.0%
1961	499	+9.4%
1970	424	−15.0%
1980	440	+3.8%
1991	412	−6.4%
2001	422	+2.4%
2011	488	+15.6%
2021	549	+12.5%
Source: Censuses
