= Smolné Pece =

- Municipality
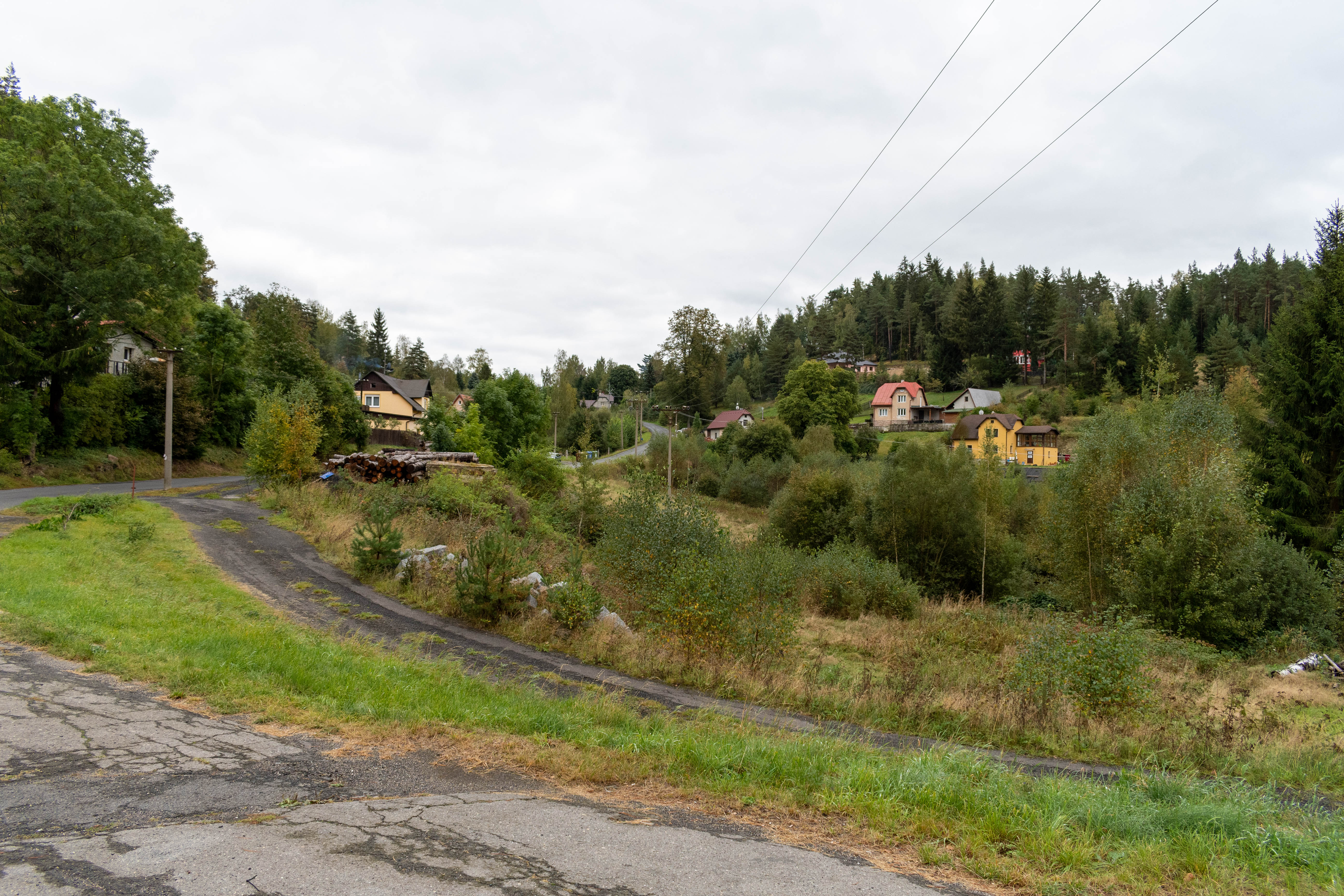
- Houses in Smolné Pece

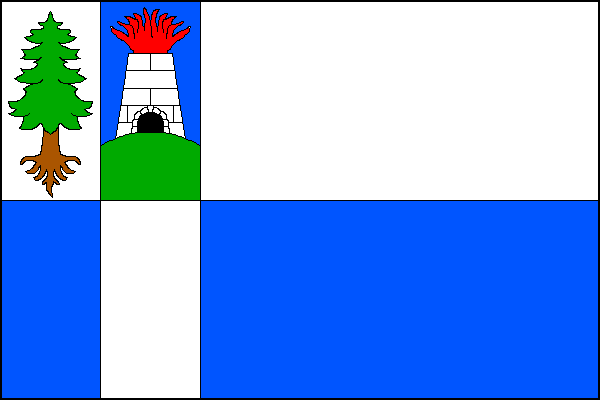
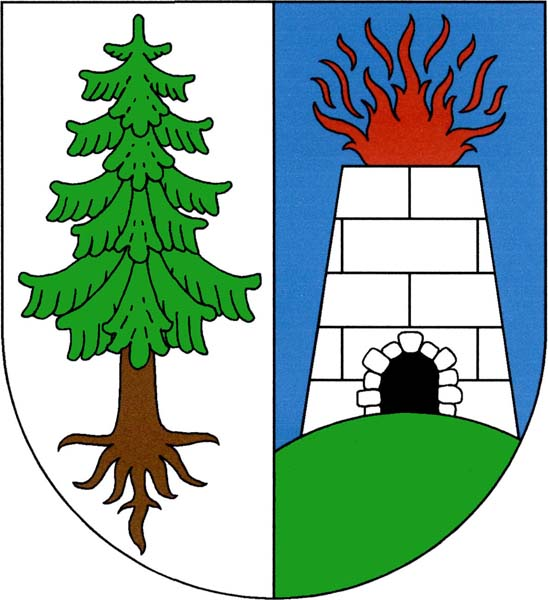
- Flag Coat of arms

- Location in the Czech Republic
- Coordinates: 50°17′30″N 12°45′55″E
- Country: Czech Republic
- Region: Karlovy Vary
- District: Karlovy Vary
- Founded: 1872

Area
  - Total: 6.45 km^{2} (2.49 sq mi)
- Elevation: 518 m (1,699 ft)

Population (2026-01-01)
  - Total: 242
  - Density: 37.5/km^{2} (97.2/sq mi)
- Time zone: UTC+1 (CET)
  - Summer (DST): UTC+2 (CEST)
- Postal code: 362 25
- Website: www.smolnepece.cz

Smolné Pece (German: Pechöfen) is a municipality and village in Karlovy Vary District in the Karlovy Vary Region of the Czech Republic. It has about 200 inhabitants.

== History ==
Smolné Pece was established in 1872.

== Demographics ==
Historical population
Year	Pop.	±%
1869	–	—
1880	–	—
1890	185	—
1900	247	+33.5%
1910	280	+13.4%
1921	0	−100.0%
1930	327	—
1950	0	−100.0%
1961	177	—
1970	139	−21.5%
1980	87	−37.4%
1991	57	−34.5%
2001	91	+59.6%
2011	148	+62.6%
2021	230	+55.4%
Source: Censuses
