= Kolová =

- Municipality
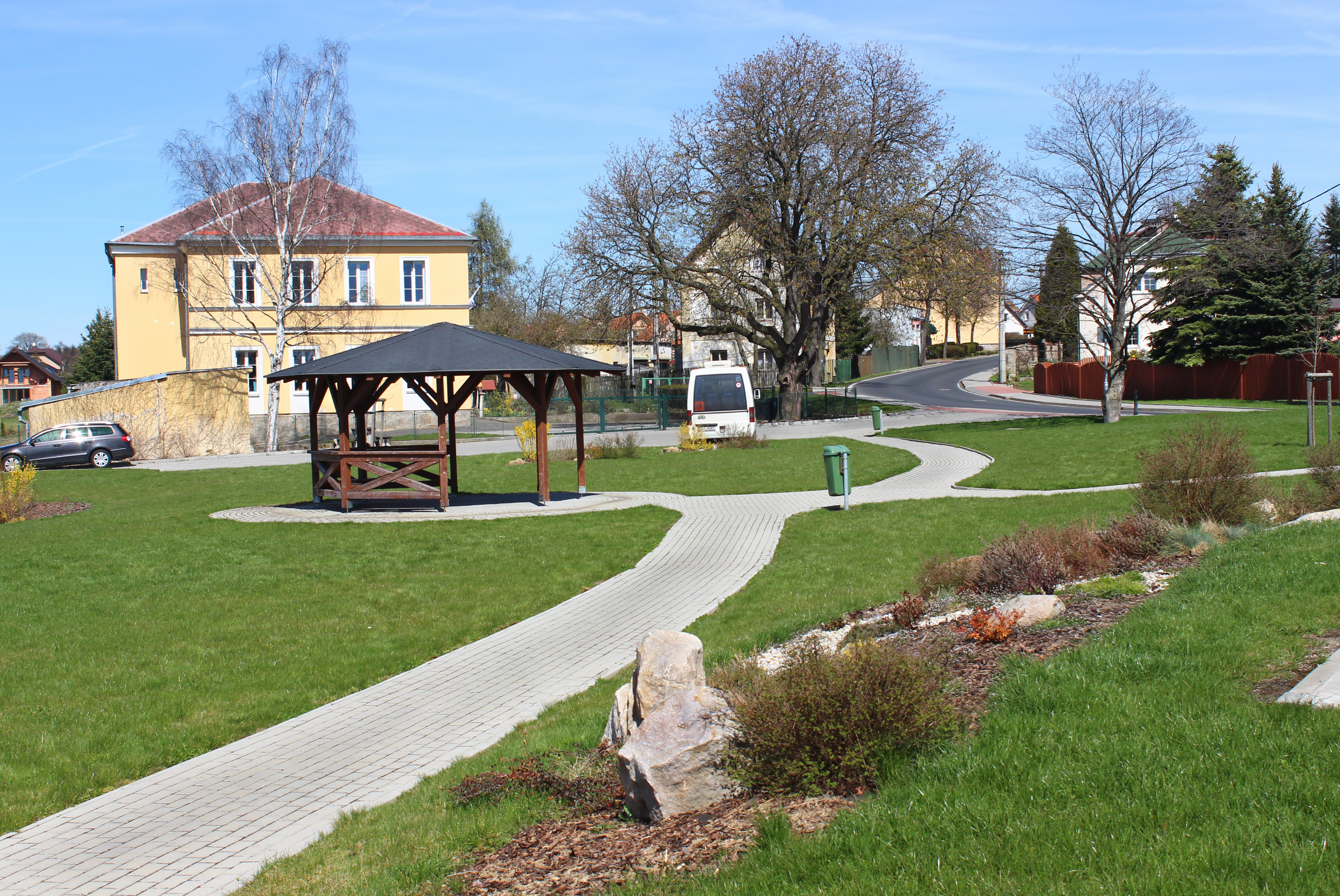
- A park in Kolová

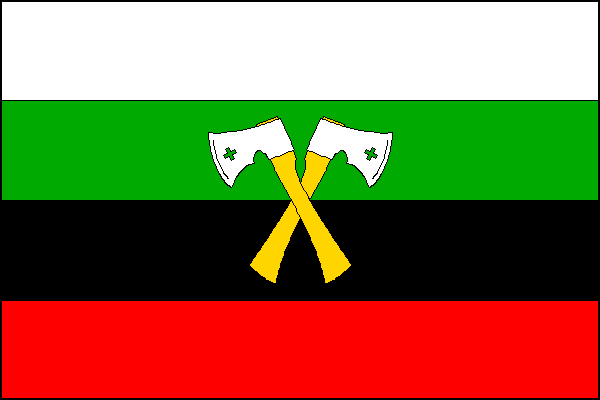
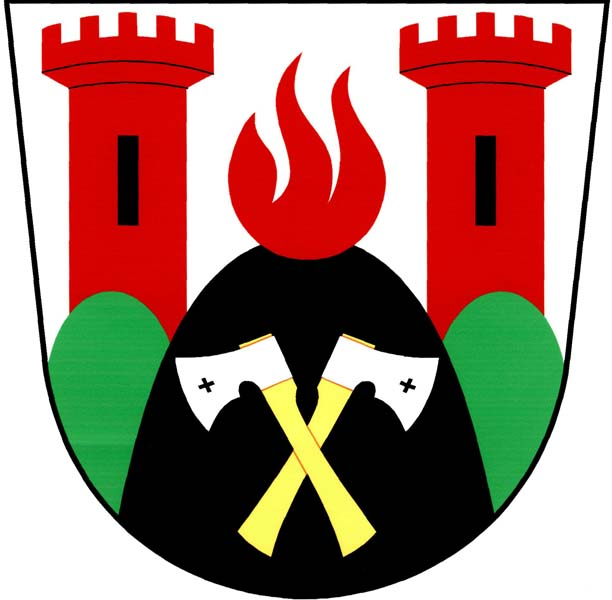
- Flag Coat of arms

- Location in the Czech Republic
- Coordinates: 50°11′15″N 12°54′12″E
- Country: Czech Republic
- Region: Karlovy Vary
- District: Karlovy Vary
- First mentioned: 1622

Area
  - Total: 7.03 km^{2} (2.71 sq mi)
- Elevation: 575 m (1,886 ft)

Population (2026-01-01)
  - Total: 952
  - Density: 135/km^{2} (351/sq mi)
- Time zone: UTC+1 (CET)
  - Summer (DST): UTC+2 (CEST)
- Postal codes: 360 01
- Website: www.kolova-haje.cz

Kolová (German: Kohlhau, Kohlau) is a municipality and village in Karlovy Vary District in the Karlovy Vary Region of the Czech Republic. It has about 1,000 inhabitants.

== Administrative division ==
Kolová consists of two municipal parts (in brackets population according to the 2021 census):

- Kolová (637)
- Háje (182)

== History ==
The first written mention of Kolová is from 1622. The village of Háje (originally named Funkštejn, after the eponymous castle which stood nearby) was first mentioned in 1536. Kolová was initially administered as part of Funkštejn, but in 1713, it became a separate municipality. In 1945, Funkštejn was renamed Háje.

== Demographics ==
Historical population
Year	Pop.	±%
1869	787	—
1880	856	+8.8%
1890	931	+8.8%
1900	1,001	+7.5%
1910	1,056	+5.5%
1921	947	−10.3%
1930	971	+2.5%
1950	476	−51.0%
1961	503	+5.7%
1970	481	−4.4%
1980	453	−5.8%
1991	487	+7.5%
2001	553	+13.6%
2011	711	+28.6%
2021	819	+15.2%
Source: Censuses
