= Jenišov =

- Municipality
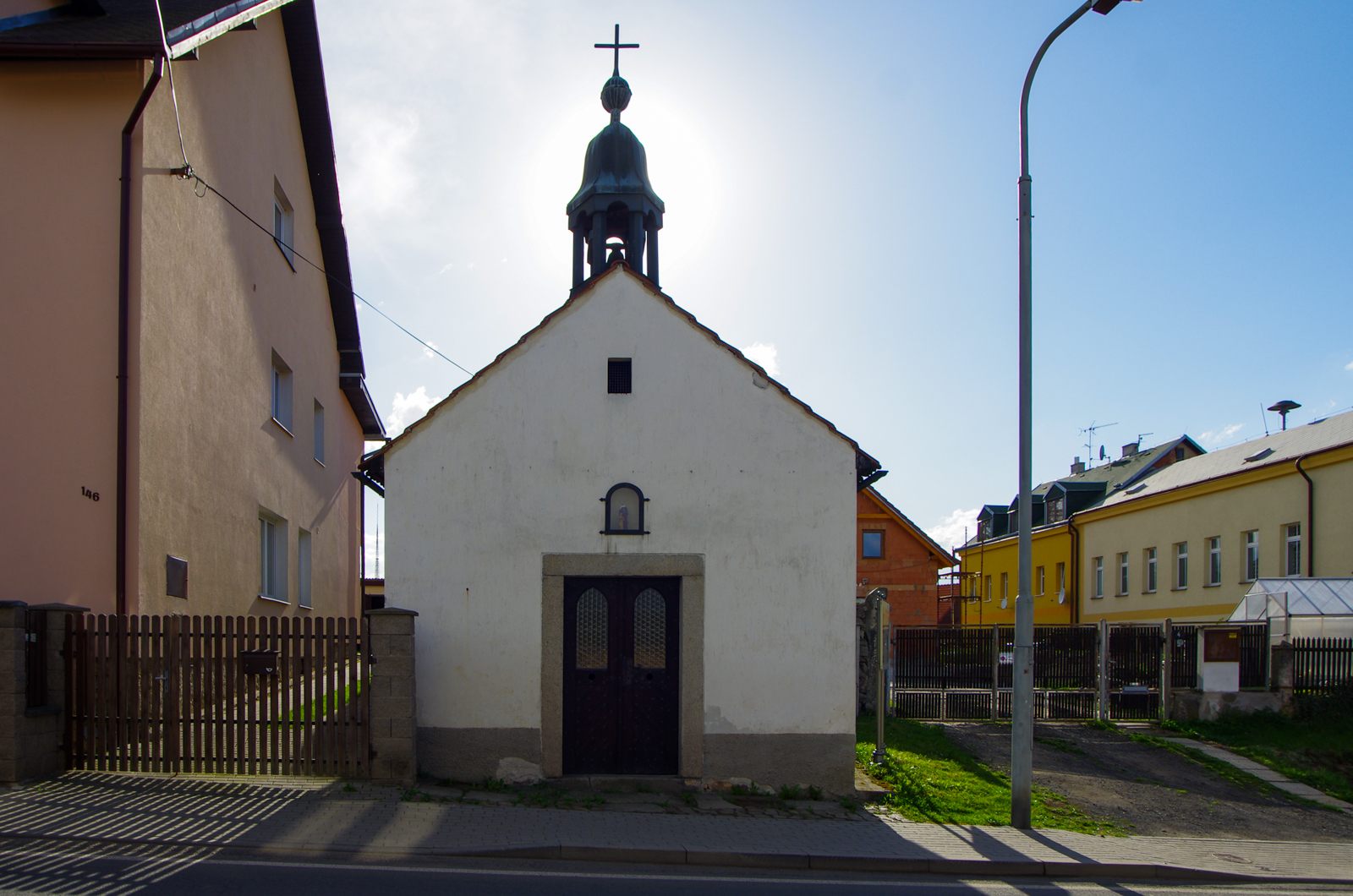
- Chapel of Saint Anne

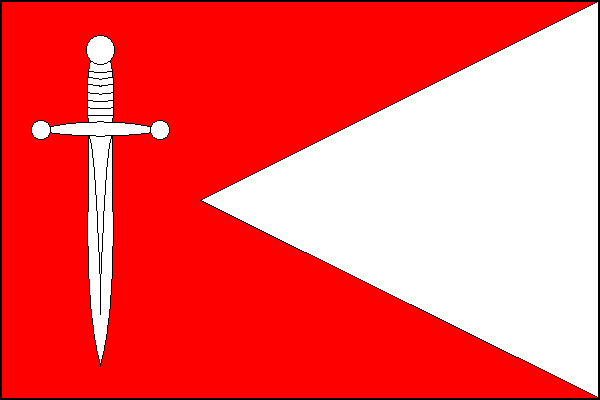
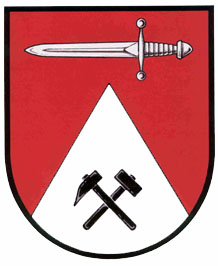
- Flag Coat of arms

- Location in the Czech Republic
- Coordinates: 50°13′36″N 12°48′0″E
- Country: Czech Republic
- Region: Karlovy Vary
- District: Karlovy Vary
- First mentioned: 1390

Area
  - Total: 5.18 km^{2} (2.00 sq mi)
- Elevation: 421 m (1,381 ft)

Population (2026-01-01)
  - Total: 1,116
  - Density: 215/km^{2} (558/sq mi)
- Time zone: UTC+1 (CET)
  - Summer (DST): UTC+2 (CEST)
- Postal code: 362 11
- Website: www.jenisov.cz

Jenišov (German: Janessen) is a municipality and village in Karlovy Vary District in the Karlovy Vary Region of the Czech Republic. It has about 1,100 inhabitants.

== Administrative division ==
Jenišov consists of two municipal parts (in brackets population according to the 2021 census):

- Jenišov (758)
- Pod Rohem (313)

== Demographics ==
Historical population
Year	Pop.	±%
1869	628	—
1880	778	+23.9%
1890	895	+15.0%
1900	1,203	+34.4%
1910	1,338	+11.2%
1921	1,122	−16.1%
1930	1,406	+25.3%
1950	496	−64.7%
1961	379	−23.6%
1970	332	−12.4%
1980	294	−11.4%
1991	306	+4.1%
2001	332	+8.5%
2011	838	+152.4%
2021	1,071	+27.8%
Source: Censuses
