= Šemnice =

- Municipality
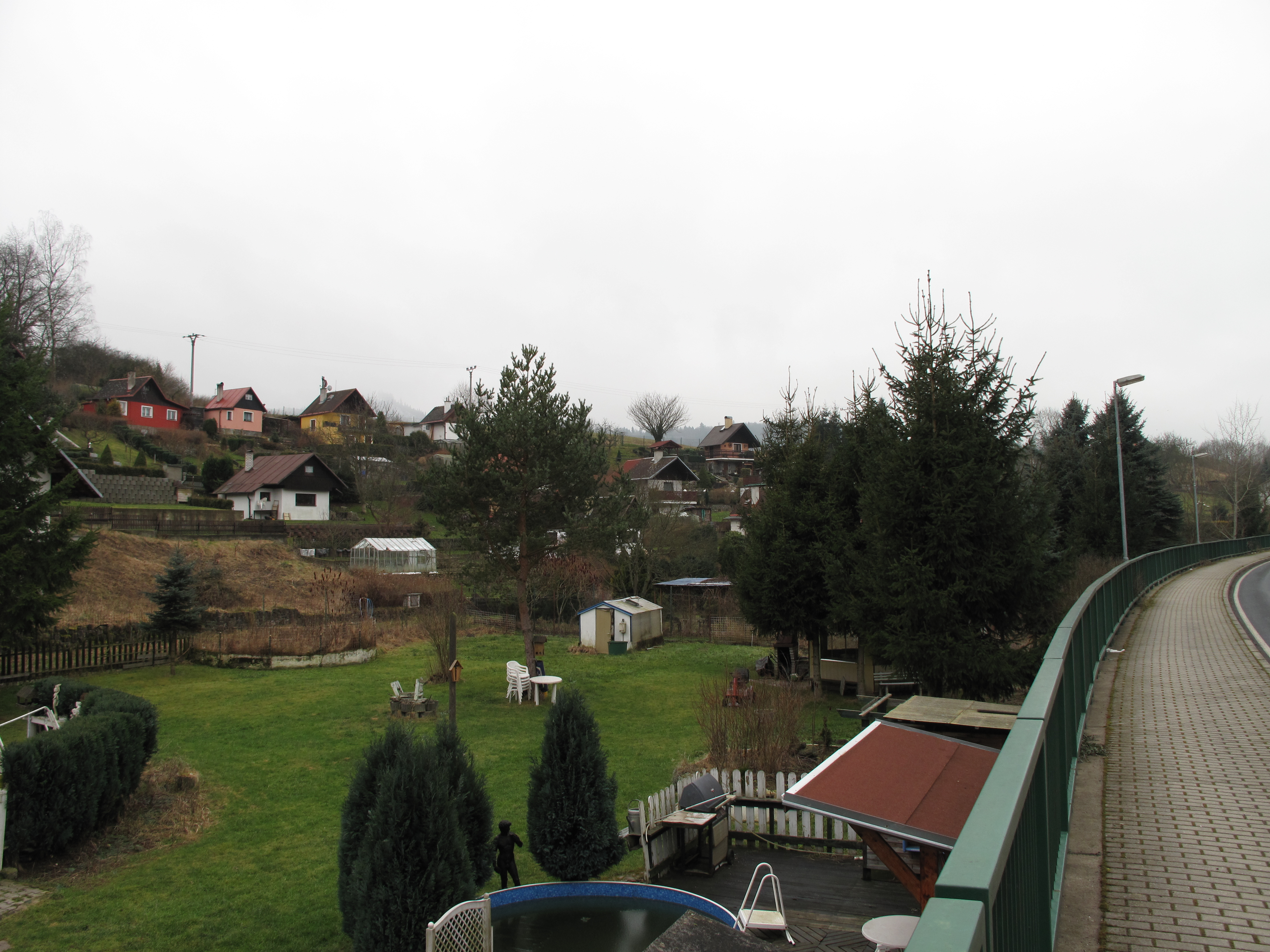
- Dubina, a part of Šemnice

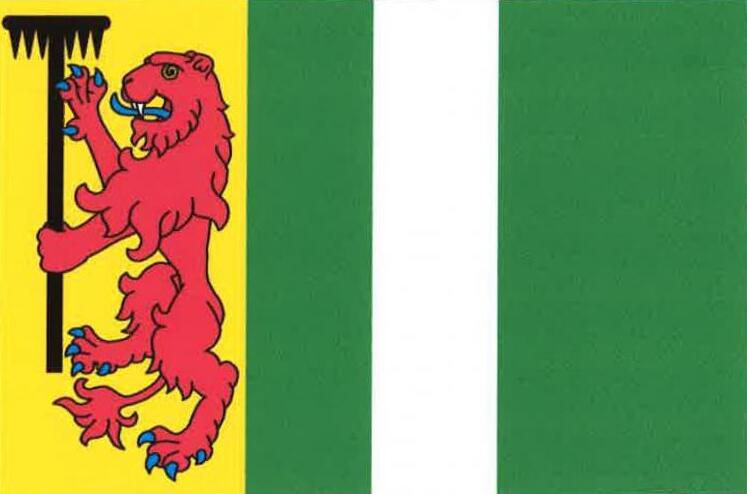
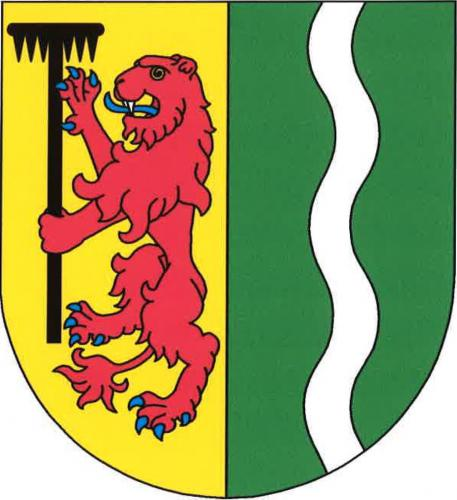
- Flag Coat of arms

- Location in the Czech Republic
- Coordinates: 50°14′13″N 12°58′34″E
- Country: Czech Republic
- Region: Karlovy Vary
- District: Karlovy Vary
- First mentioned: 1239

Area
  - Total: 13.22 km^{2} (5.10 sq mi)
- Elevation: 423 m (1,388 ft)

Population (2026-01-01)
  - Total: 659
  - Density: 49.8/km^{2} (129/sq mi)
- Time zone: UTC+1 (CET)
  - Summer (DST): UTC+2 (CEST)
- Postal code: 362 72
- Website: www.semnice.cz

Šemnice (German: Schömitz) is a municipality and village in Karlovy Vary District in the Karlovy Vary Region of the Czech Republic. It has about 700 inhabitants.

== Administrative division ==
Šemnice consists of four municipal parts (in brackets population according to the 2021 census):

- Šemnice (186)
- Dubina (195)
- Pulovice (60)
- Sedlečko (207)

== Demographics ==
Historical population
| Year | Pop. | ±% |
|---|---|---|
| 1869 | 829 | — |
| 1880 | 900 | +8.6% |
| 1890 | 857 | −4.8% |
| 1900 | 1,008 | +17.6% |
| 1910 | 1,110 | +10.1% |
| 1921 | 959 | −13.6% |
| 1930 | 1,012 | +5.5% |
| 1950 | 355 | −64.9% |
| 1961 | 411 | +15.8% |
| 1970 | 398 | −3.2% |
| 1980 | 425 | +6.8% |
| 1991 | 409 | −3.8% |
| 2001 | 488 | +19.3% |
| 2011 | 567 | +16.2% |
| 2021 | 648 | +14.3% |
Source: Censuses
