= Sadov =

- Municipality
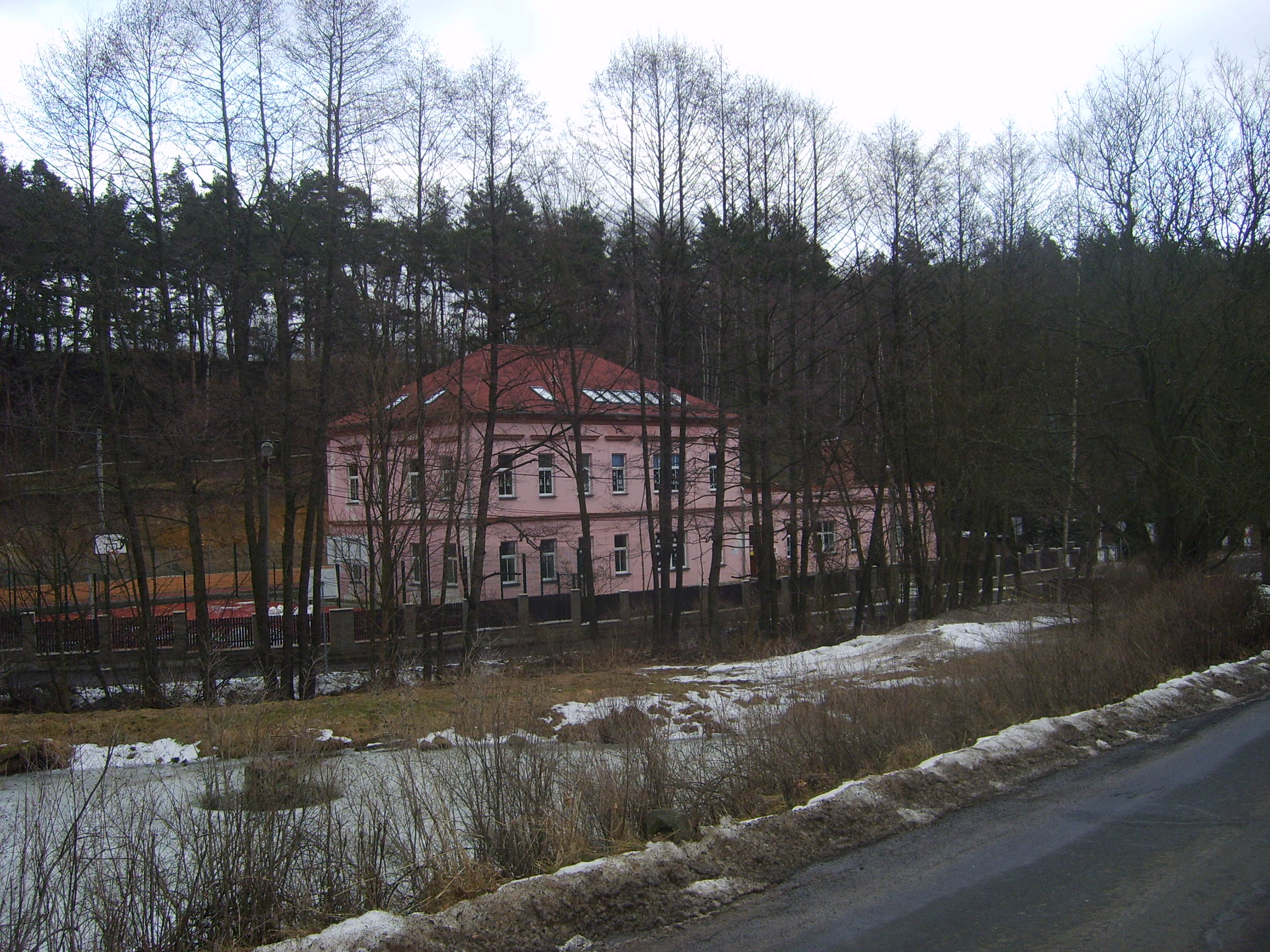
- Primary school

- Flag Coat of arms

- Location in the Czech Republic
- Coordinates: 50°16′2″N 12°53′50″E
- Country: Czech Republic
- Region: Karlovy Vary
- District: Karlovy Vary
- First mentioned: 1253

Area
  - Total: 19.34 km^{2} (7.47 sq mi)
- Elevation: 410 m (1,350 ft)

Population (2026-01-01)
  - Total: 1,298
  - Density: 67.11/km^{2} (173.8/sq mi)
- Time zone: UTC+1 (CET)
  - Summer (DST): UTC+2 (CEST)
- Postal code: 360 01
- Website: www.sadov.cz

Sadov (German: Sodau) is a municipality and village in Karlovy Vary District in the Karlovy Vary Region of the Czech Republic. It has about 1,300 inhabitants.

== Administrative division ==
Sadov consists of five municipal parts (in brackets population according to the 2021 census):

- Sadov (353)
- Bor (313)
- Lesov (461)
- Podlesí (135)
- Stráň (45)

== Demographics ==
Historical population
Year	Pop.	±%
1869	819	—
1880	1,070	+30.6%
1890	1,382	+29.2%
1900	1,840	+33.1%
1910	2,185	+18.8%
1921	1,977	−9.5%
1930	2,529	+27.9%
1950	1,357	−46.3%
1961	1,232	−9.2%
1970	1,066	−13.5%
1980	944	−11.4%
1991	907	−3.9%
2001	1,010	+11.4%
2011	1,165	+15.3%
2021	1,307	+12.2%
Source: Censuses
