= Stružná =

- Municipality
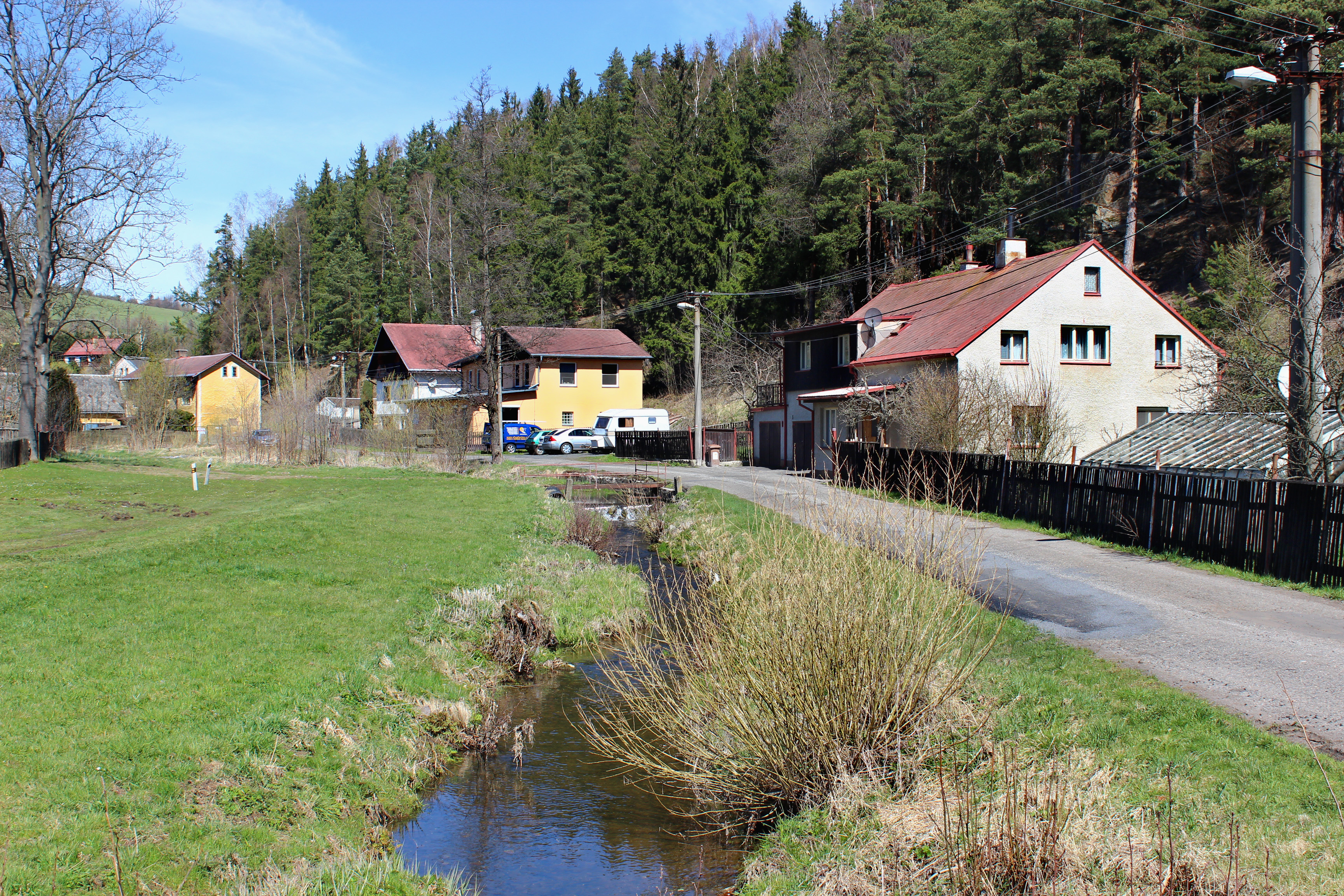
- Horní Tašovice, a part of Stružná

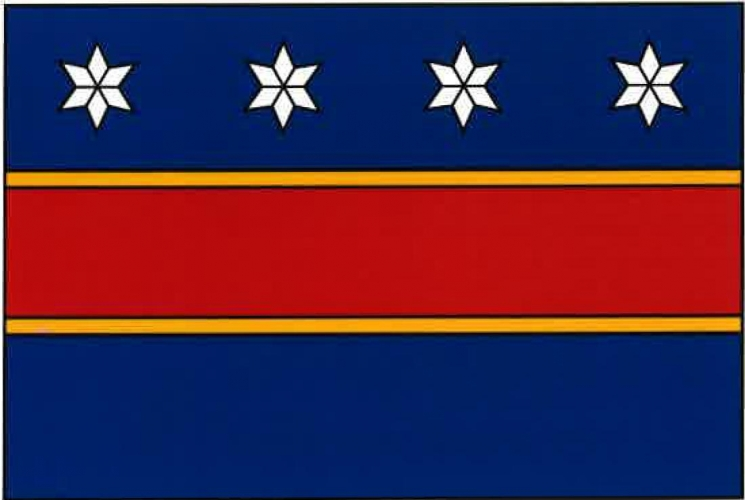
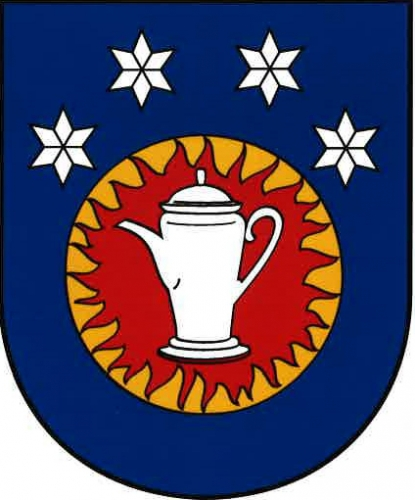
- Flag Coat of arms

- Location in the Czech Republic
- Coordinates: 50°11′0″N 13°0′21″E
- Country: Czech Republic
- Region: Karlovy Vary
- District: Karlovy Vary
- First mentioned: 1378

Area
  - Total: 12.62 km^{2} (4.87 sq mi)
- Elevation: 645 m (2,116 ft)

Population (2026-01-01)
  - Total: 633
  - Density: 50.2/km^{2} (130/sq mi)
- Time zone: UTC+1 (CET)
  - Summer (DST): UTC+2 (CEST)
- Postal code: 364 71
- Website: www.struzna.cz

Stružná (until 1949 Kysibl; German: Gießhübel) is a municipality and village in Karlovy Vary District in the Karlovy Vary Region of the Czech Republic. It has about 600 inhabitants.

== Administrative division ==
Stružná consists of five municipal parts (in brackets population according to the 2021 census):

- Stružná (284)
- Horní Tašovice (81)
- Nová Víska (29)
- Peklo (4)
- Žalmanov (141)

== History ==
The first written mention of Stružná is from 1378. Until 1949, it was called Kysibl.

== Demographics ==
Historical population
Year	Pop.	±%
1869	1,471	—
1880	1,655	+12.5%
1890	1,615	−2.4%
1900	1,721	+6.6%
1910	1,743	+1.3%
1921	1,425	−18.2%
1930	1,355	−4.9%
1950	576	−57.5%
1961	605	+5.0%
1970	565	−6.6%
1980	440	−22.1%
1991	475	+8.0%
2001	502	+5.7%
2011	511	+1.8%
2021	539	+5.5%
Source: Censuses
