= Otovice (Karlovy Vary District) =

- Municipality
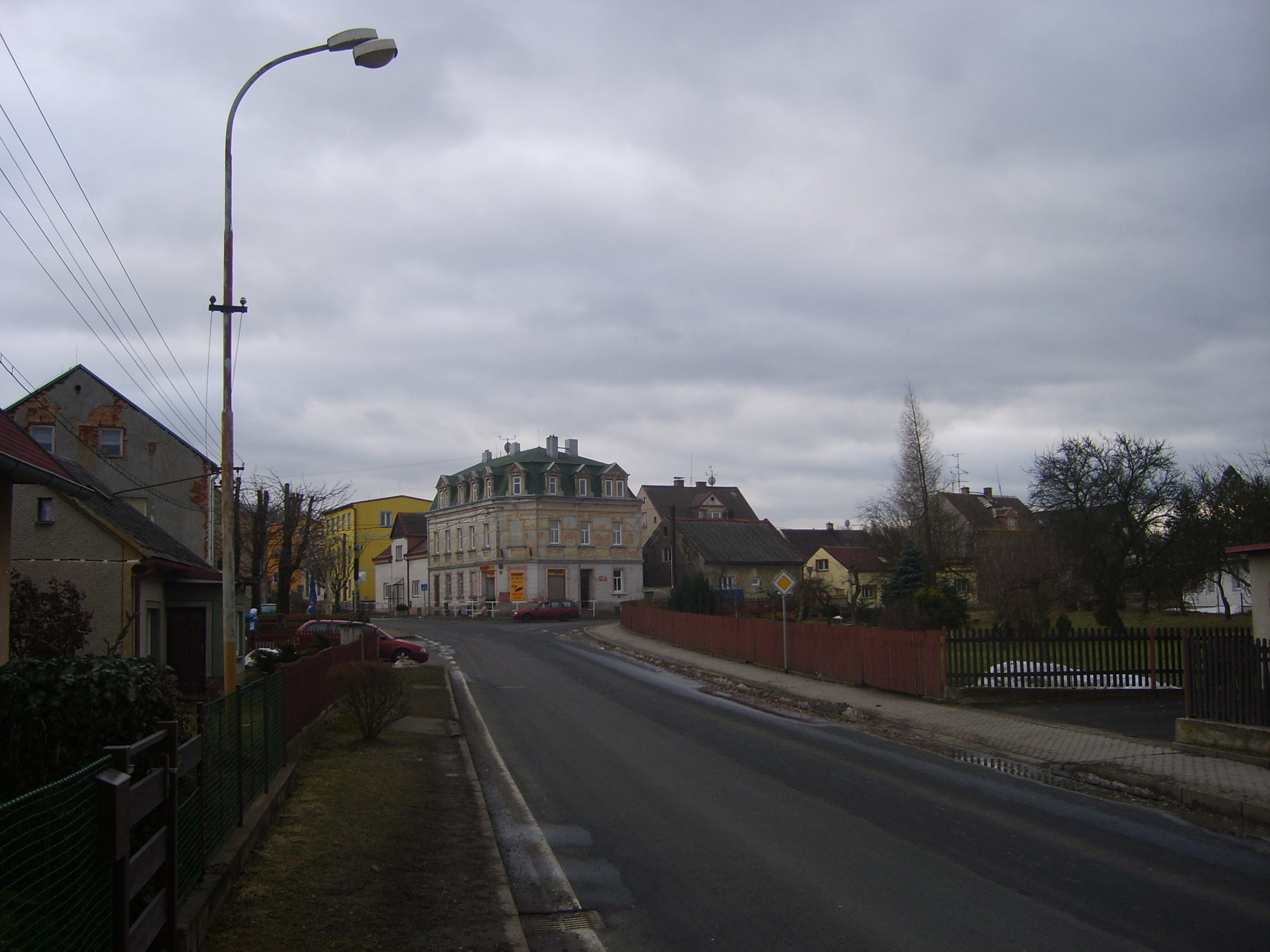
- Centre of Otovice

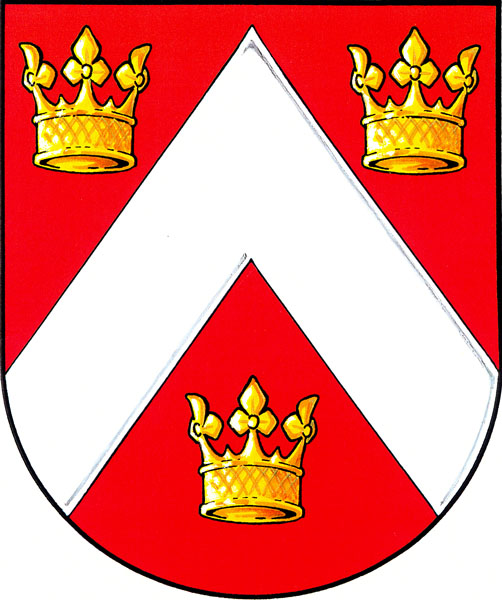
- Flag Coat of arms

- Location in the Czech Republic
- Coordinates: 50°15′20″N 12°52′18″E
- Country: Czech Republic
- Region: Karlovy Vary
- District: Karlovy Vary
- First mentioned: 1325

Area
  - Total: 4.41 km^{2} (1.70 sq mi)
- Elevation: 417 m (1,368 ft)

Population (2026-01-01)
  - Total: 1,061
  - Density: 241/km^{2} (623/sq mi)
- Time zone: UTC+1 (CET)
  - Summer (DST): UTC+2 (CEST)
- Postal code: 362 32
- Website: www.otovice.cz

Otovice (German: Ottowitz) is a municipality and village in Karlovy Vary District in the Karlovy Vary Region of the Czech Republic. It has about 1,100 inhabitants.

== Demographics ==
Historical population
Year	Pop.	±%
1869	335	—
1880	614	+83.3%
1890	851	+38.6%
1900	1,054	+23.9%
1910	1,060	+0.6%
1921	1,033	−2.5%
1930	1,480	+43.3%
1950	797	−46.1%
1961	709	−11.0%
1970	602	−15.1%
1980	569	−5.5%
1991	510	−10.4%
2001	568	+11.4%
2011	698	+22.9%
2021	985	+41.1%
Source: Censuses
