= Karlovy Vary Region =

Region of the Czech Republic

Karlovy Vary Region Karlovarský kraj
- Region
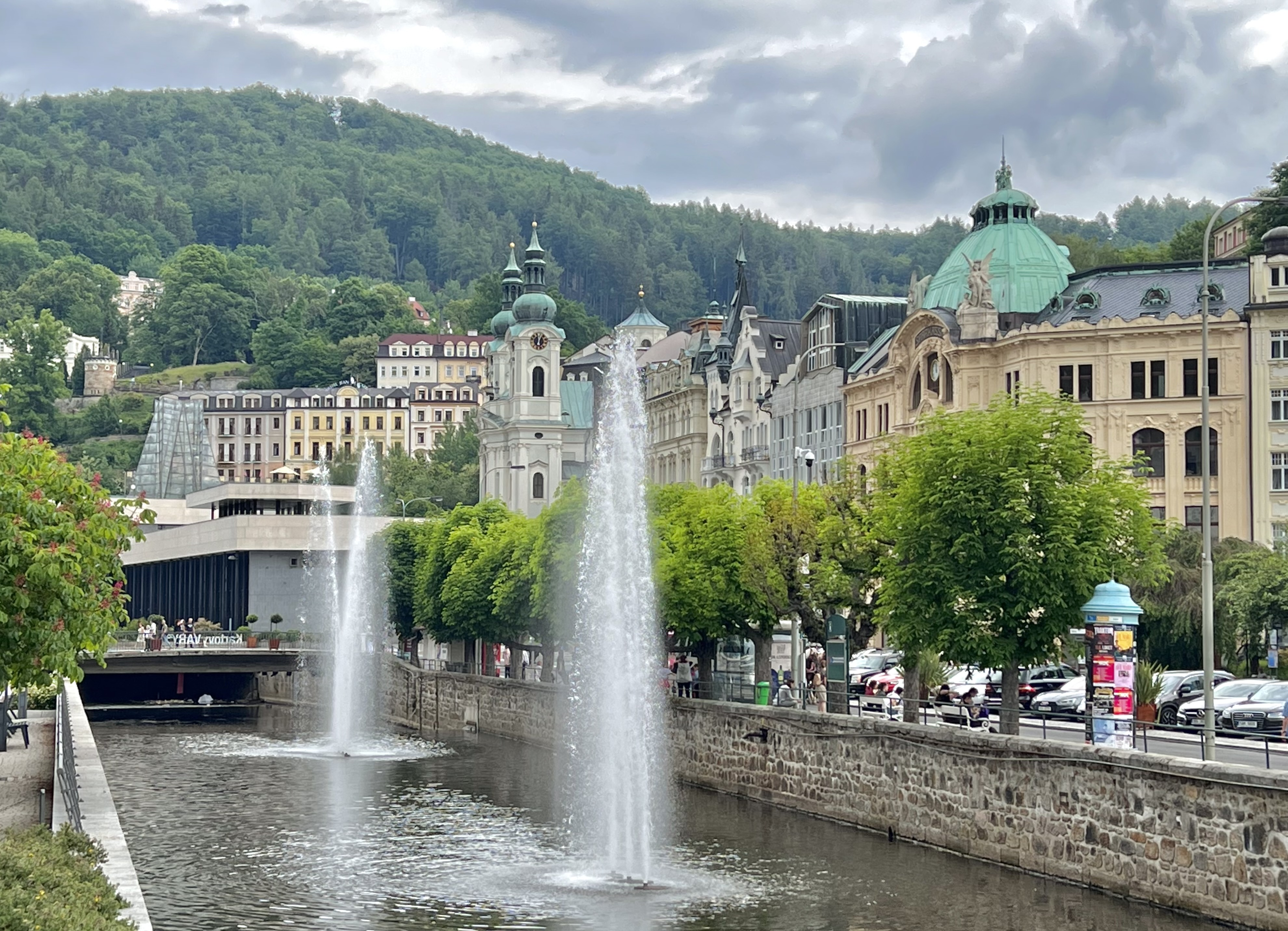

- Flag Coat of arms

- Coordinates: 50°13′42″N 12°58′00″E
- Country: Czech Republic
- Capital: Karlovy Vary
- Districts: Karlovy Vary District, Sokolov District, Cheb District

Government
  - Governor: Jana Mračková Vildumetzová (ANO)

Area
  - Total: 3,314.46 km^{2} (1,279.72 sq mi)
- Highest elevation: 1,244 m (4,081 ft)

Population (2024-01-01)
  - Total: 295,077
  - Density: 89.0272/km^{2} (230.579/sq mi)

GDP
  - Total: CZK 99.823 billion (€3.893 billion)
- ISO 3166 code: CZ-41
- Vehicle registration: K
- Website: www.kr-karlovarsky.cz

The Karlovy Vary Region (Czech: Karlovarský kraj) is an administrative unit (Czech: kraj) of the Czech Republic, located in the westernmost part of the country. It is named after its capital Karlovy Vary. It is known for spas, which include Karlovy Vary and Mariánské Lázně.

The Karlovy Vary Region, as a higher territorial self-governing unit, was created in 2000 in the northern part of the West Bohemian Region. The seat of the region is Karlovy Vary. In terms of size, number of municipalities, and population, it ranks among the smaller regions of the Czech Republic. Its area (3,314 km^{2}) covers 4.25% of the territory of the Czech Republic. The Karlovy Vary Region is the third smallest region by area, right after Prague and the Liberec Region. By population, the Karlovy Vary Region is the smallest region in the Czech Republic, with approximately 279,000 inhabitants.

== Administrative divisions ==
The Karlovy Vary Region is divided into three districts:

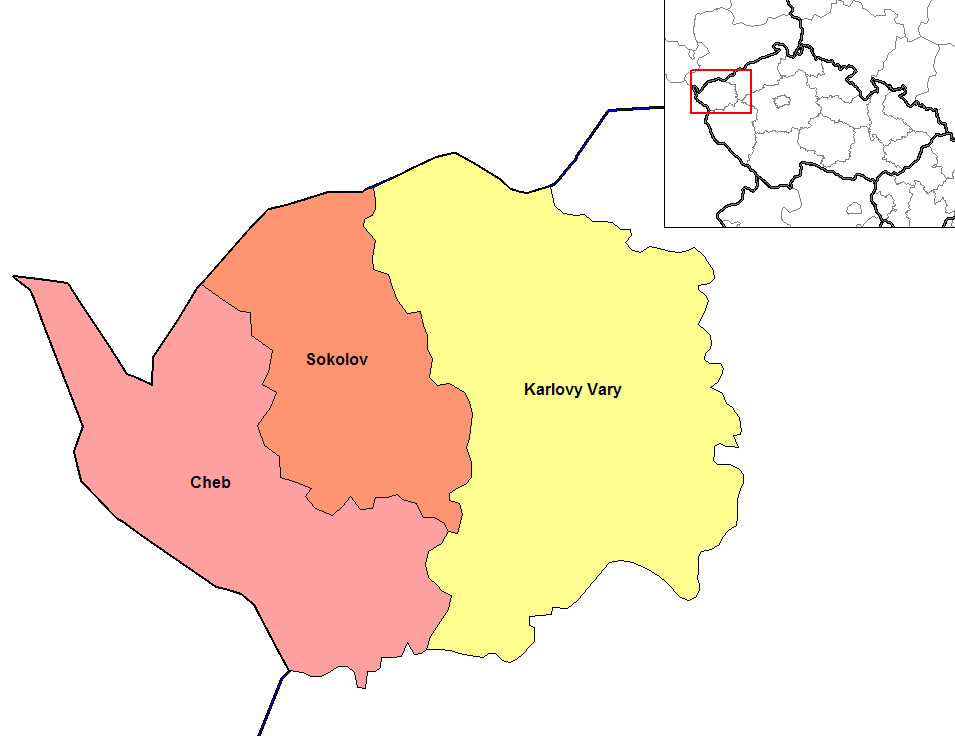
Districts of Karlovy Vary Region

Cheb	Karlovy Vary	Sokolov

At a lower level, the region has 134 municipalities, comprising 56 in the Karlovy Vary District, 40 in the Cheb District and 38 in the Sokolov District.

Since 1 January 2003, Karlovy Vary Region has been administratively divided into 7 administrative districts of municipalities with extended powers (AD MEP):

AD MEP	Population	Area (km^{2)}	Density
Aš	17,255	143.75	120
Cheb	51,232	496.81	103.1
Karlovy Vary	88,671	1,171.45	75.7
Kraslice	12,757	264.54	48.2
Mariánské Lázně	25,737	405.32	63.5
Ostrov	26,512	339.29	78.1
Sokolov	72,913	489.19	149

== Population ==
Karlovy Vary Region is the smallest region in the Czech Republic with a population of less than 300,000. Only 11 municipalities have populations greater than 5,000. The largest municipality of the region is Karlovy Vary with a population of around 50,000. The table below shows the municipalities in Karlovy Vary Region with the largest population (as of 1 January 2024):

Name	Population	Area (km^{2})	District
Karlovy Vary	49,353	59	Karlovy Vary District
Cheb	32,825	96	Cheb District
Sokolov	22,155	23	Sokolov District
Ostrov	15,825	50	Karlovy Vary District
Mariánské Lázně	14,225	52	Cheb District
Chodov	12,649	14	Sokolov District
Aš	12,783	56	Cheb District

Other significant towns in Karlovy Vary Region are Nejdek, Kraslice, Františkovy Lázně and Horní Slavkov.

Historical population

Year	Pop.	±%
1869	322,278	—
1880	357,772	+11.0%
1890	379,786	+6.2%
1900	431,366	+13.6%
1910	477,729	+10.7%

Year	Pop.	±%
1921	457,130	−4.3%
1930	501,905	+9.8%
1950	243,977	−51.4%
1961	278,879	+14.3%
1970	298,110	+6.9%

Year	Pop.	±%
1980	311,995	+4.7%
1991	301,985	−3.2%
2001	304,315	+0.8%
2011	295,564	−2.9%
2021	279,103	−5.6%

Source: Censuses

== Economy ==
=== Spas ===
The region is responsible over half of the county's spa industry. Twelve spas are in the city of Karlovy Vary. Other spa towns in the region include Františkovy Lázně, Mariánské Lázně, Lázně Kynžvart and Jáchymov. The spas are visited by Czechs as well as by people from the rest of Europe, Russia, Israel and North America. The Karlovy Vary spa wafer, a local food item, was awarded protected designation of origin (PDO) status by the European Commission in 2011.

The water from the region is used in locally produced beverages including Mattoni from Karlovy Vary and Aquila from the village of Kyselka.

=== Black Triangle ===
The region is the home of two power stations, Vřesová and Tisová, both in the Sokolov District. The region is also part of the so-called Black Triangle, an area of heavy industrialization and environmental damage on the three-way border of Poland, Germany, and the Czech Republic.

== Transport ==
The Karlovy Region is served by Karlovy Vary Airport, which handled more than 100,000 passengers in 2012. The region is also home to two other airports, neither of which are used for passenger flights. These are Cheb Airport, the oldest airport in the country, and Mariánské Lázně Airport.

The region lacks any motorways. The unfinished R6 expressway passes through the region, linking Cheb and Karlovy Vary to Prague. The length of operated railway lines in the region is 493 km (306 mi).

== Education ==
The Czech University of Life Sciences Prague opened a centre in the village of Dalovice in the Karlovy Vary District in 2007. The private College of Karlovy Vary is also located in the region, in addition to regional centres of the Ambis University in Karlovy Vary and the University of West Bohemia in Cheb and Sokolov.
