= Mariánské Lázně (administrative district) =

Administrative district in the Czech Republic

Administrative district of the municipality with extended powers of Mariánské Lázně Správní obvod obce s rozšířenou působností Mariánské Lázně
- Administrative district of municipality with extended powers
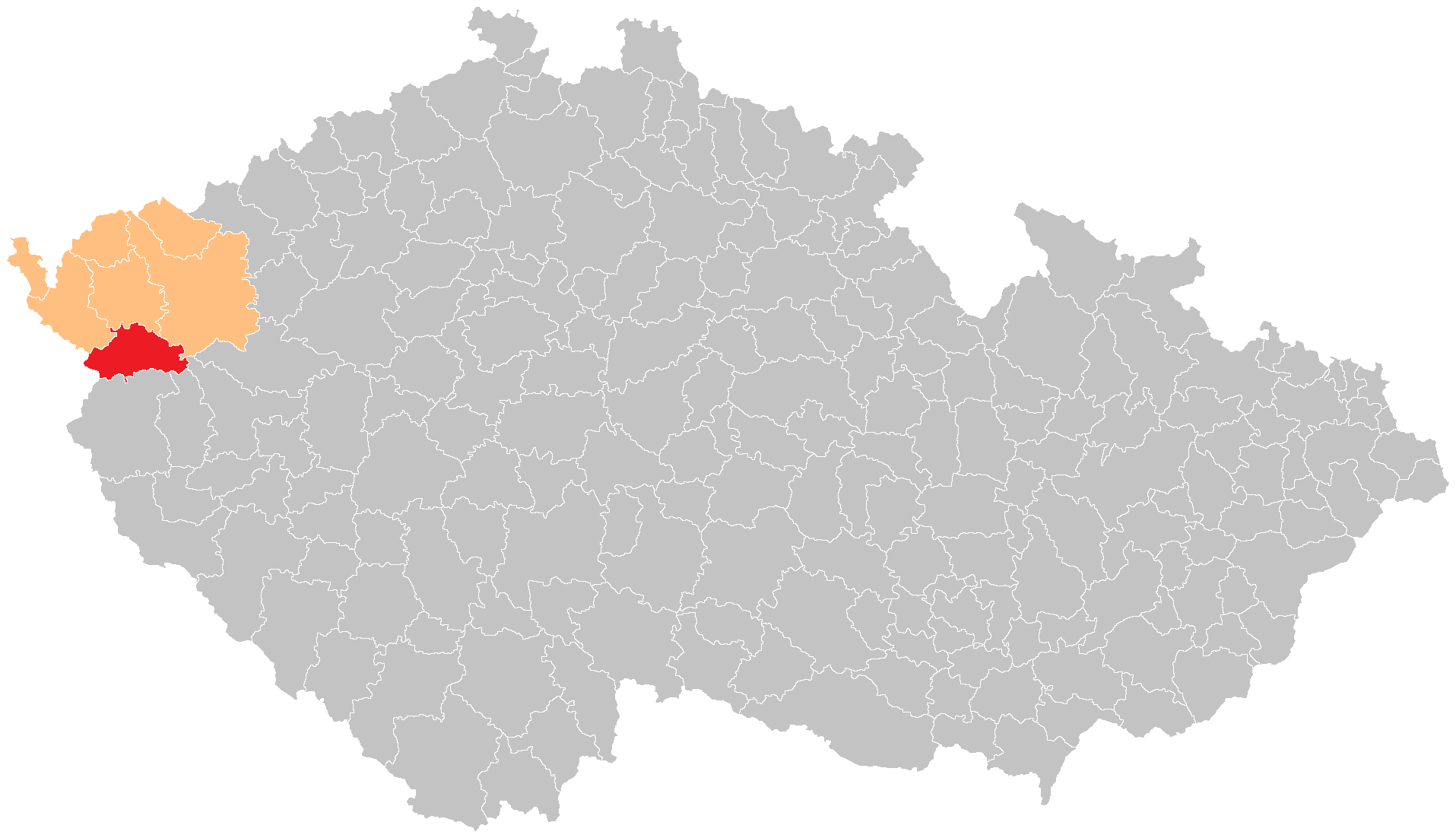
- Location in the Karlovy Vary Region within the Czech Republic
- Coordinates: 50°59′N 12°42′E
- Country: Czech Republic
- Region: Karlovy Vary
- District: Cheb
- Municipality with extended powers: Aš

Area
  - Total: 405.32 km^{2} (156.49 sq mi)

Population (2024)
  - Total: 25,737
  - Density: 63.498/km^{2} (164.46/sq mi)
- Time zone: UTC+1 (CET)
  - Summer (DST): UTC+2 (CEST)
- Municipalities: 14
- * Cities and towns: 3
- * Market towns: 0

The administrative district of the municipality with extended powers of Mariánské Lázně (abbreviated AD MEP Mariánské Lázně; Czech: Správní obvod obce s rozšířenou působností Mariánské Lázně, SO ORP Mariánské Lázně) is an administrative district of municipality with extended powers in Cheb District in the Karlovy Vary Region of the Czech Republic. It has existed since 1 January 2003, when the districts were replaced administratively. It includes 14 municipalities which have a combined population of about 26,000.

== Municipalities ==
Cities and towns are in bold.

Municipality	Population	Area (km^{2)}	Density
Drmoul	1,016	6.37	159
**Lázně Kynžvart**	1,440	32.60	44
**Mariánské Lázně**	14,225	51.79	274
Mnichov	395	27.87	14
Ovesné Kladruby	144	18.05	8
Prameny	109	24.61	4
Stará Voda	510	54.01	9
**Teplá**	2,906	113.21	26
Trstěnice	432	15.50	28
Tři Sekery	1,046	41.18	25
Valy	480	4.30	111
Velká Hleďsebe	2,423	4.56	531
Vlkovice	124	4.93	25
Zádub-Závišín	487	6.33	77

== Demographics ==
Historical population

Year	Pop.	±%
1869	28,160	—
1880	31,536	+12.0%
1890	32,201	+2.1%
1900	33,528	+4.1%
1910	36,972	+10.3%

Year	Pop.	±%
1921	35,921	−2.8%
1930	38,060	+6.0%
1950	19,350	−49.2%
1961	23,652	+22.2%
1970	24,080	+1.8%

Year	Pop.	±%
1980	25,387	+5.4%
1991	25,512	+0.5%
2001	25,143	−1.4%
2011	23,451	−6.7%
2021	22,716	−3.1%

Source: Censuses
