= Aš (disambiguation) =

Aš is a town in the Czech Republic.

Aš may also refer to:

- Aš (administrative district), an administrative district in the Czech Republic
- Aš (cuneiform), a cuneiform sign
- aš, a personal pronoun in Lithuanian

== See also ==
- (AŠ)² or For a Good Latvia, former political party in Latvia
- As (disambiguation)
