= Okrouhlá (Cheb District) =

- Municipality
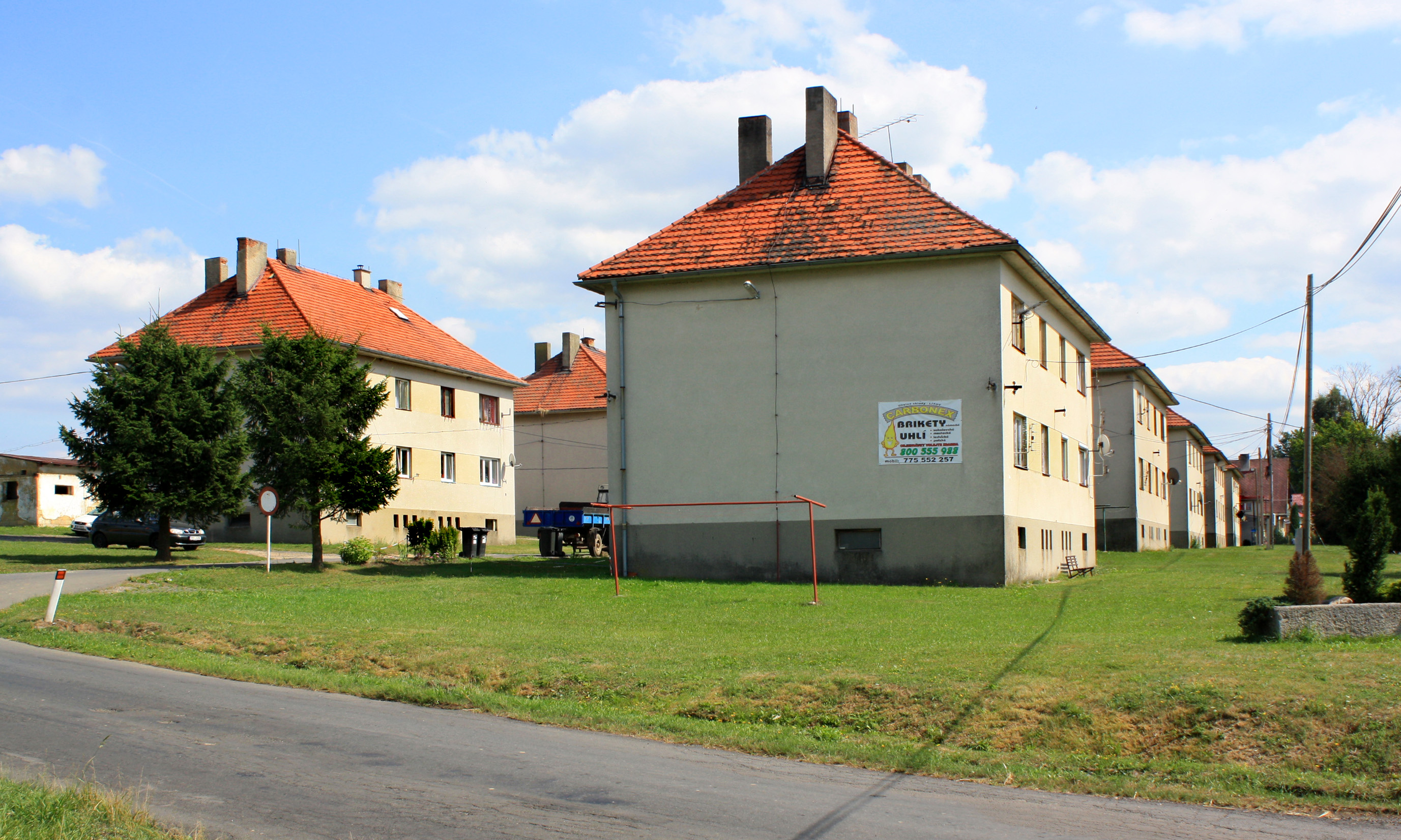
- Tenement houses

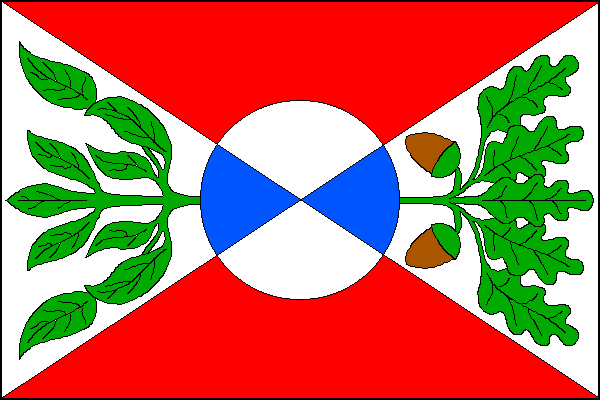
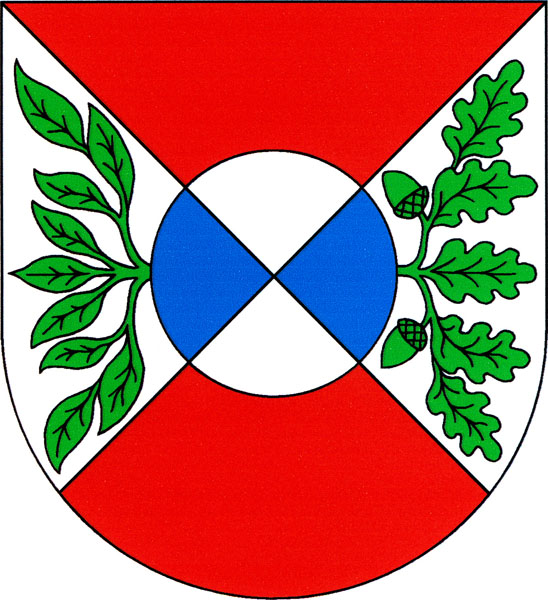
- Flag Coat of arms

- Location in the Czech Republic
- Coordinates: 50°3′45″N 12°29′16″E
- Country: Czech Republic
- Region: Karlovy Vary
- District: Cheb
- First mentioned: 1447

Area
  - Total: 10.43 km^{2} (4.03 sq mi)
- Elevation: 445 m (1,460 ft)

Population (2026-01-01)
  - Total: 266
  - Density: 25.5/km^{2} (66.1/sq mi)
- Time zone: UTC+1 (CET)
  - Summer (DST): UTC+2 (CEST)
- Postal code: 350 02
- Website: www.obec-okrouhla.cz

Okrouhlá (German: Scheibenreuth) is a municipality and village in Cheb District in the Karlovy Vary Region of the Czech Republic. It has about 300 inhabitants.

== Administrative division ==
Okrouhlá consists of two municipal parts (in brackets population according to the 2021 census):

- Okrouhlá (189)
- Jesenice (62)

== Etymology ==
The name Okrouhlá literally means 'rounded' in Czech. It refers to the original shape of the village.

== Geography ==
Okrouhlá is located about 8 kilometres (5 mi) east of Cheb and 31 km (19 mi) southwest of Karlovy Vary. It lies in a flat landscape in the Cheb Basin. The highest point is at 476 m (1,562 ft) above sea level. The municipality is situated on the right shore of the Jesenice Reservoir, built on the Wondreb river.

== History ==
The first written mention of Okrouhlá is from 1447.

== Demographics ==
Historical population

Year	Pop.	±%
1869	571	—
1880	535	−6.3%
1890	438	−18.1%
1900	427	−2.5%
1910	466	+9.1%

Year	Pop.	±%
1921	457	−1.9%
1930	442	−3.3%
1950	205	−53.6%
1961	282	+37.6%
1970	234	−17.0%

Year	Pop.	±%
1980	214	−8.5%
1991	195	−8.9%
2001	234	+20.0%
2011	245	+4.7%
2021	251	+2.4%

Source: Censuses

== Transport ==
The I/21 road, which connects the D5 and D6 motorways, runs through the municipality.

== Sights ==
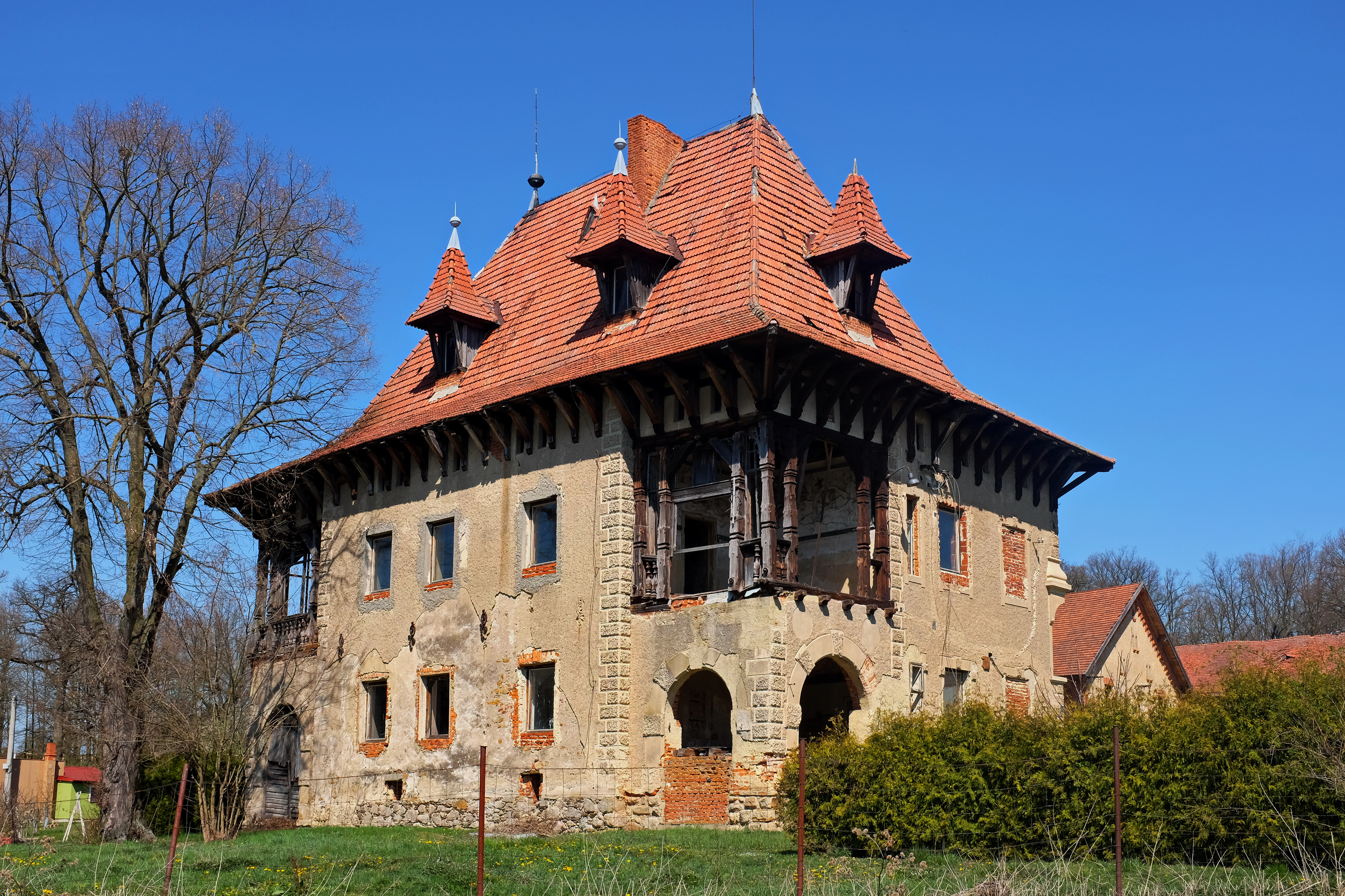
Okrouhlá Castle

The main landmark is the Okrouhlá Castle. It was built as a Gothic fortress at the beginning of the 14th century. At the end of the 19th century, it was rebuilt into a romantic manor house.
