= Třebeň =

- Municipality
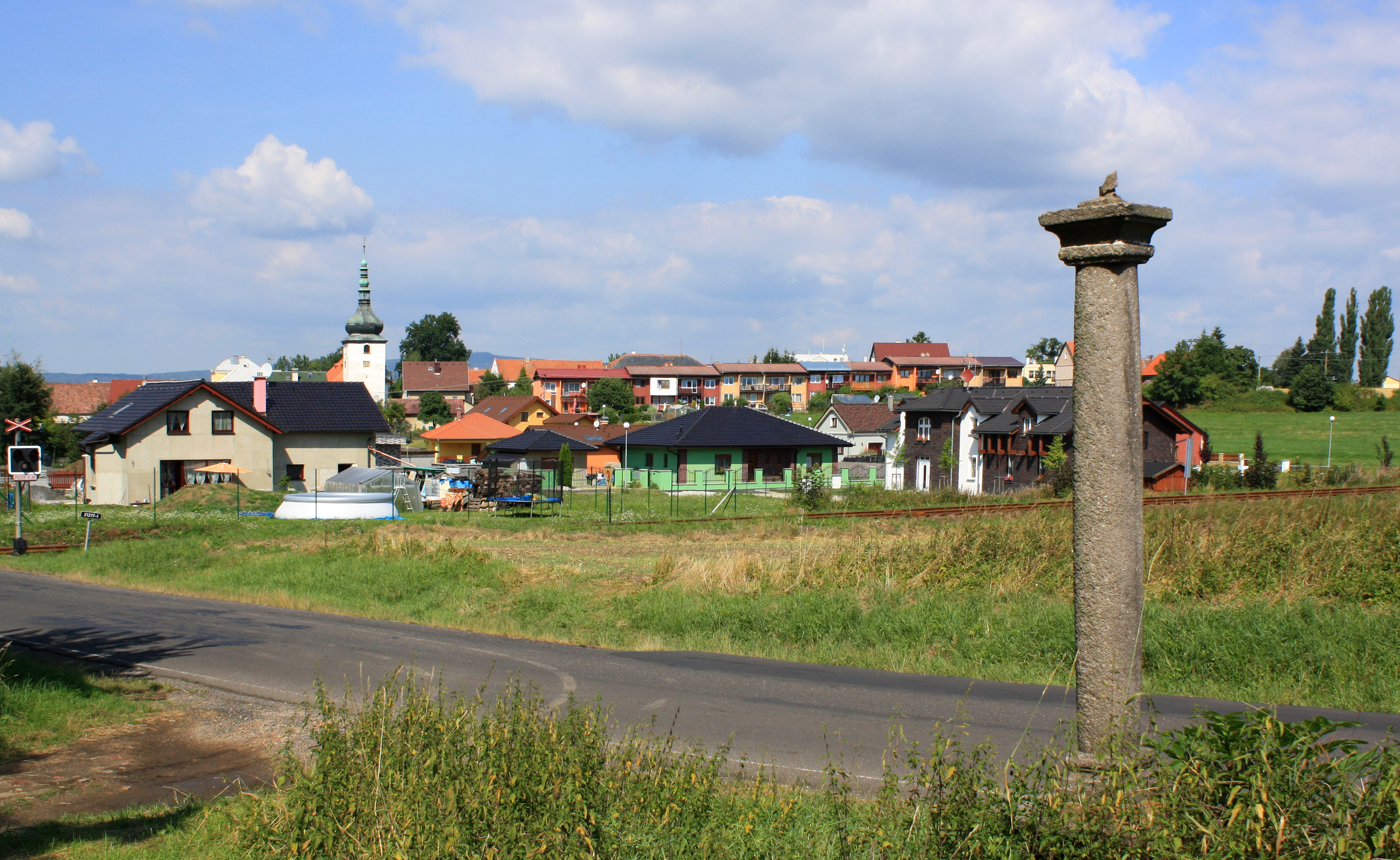
- Eastern part of Třebeň

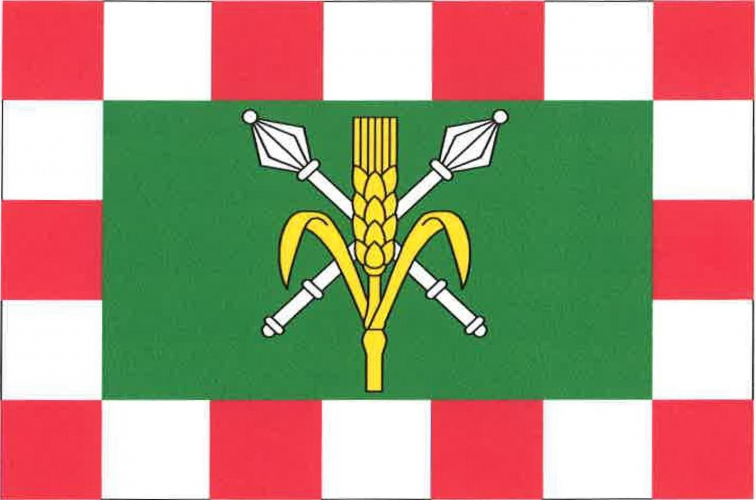
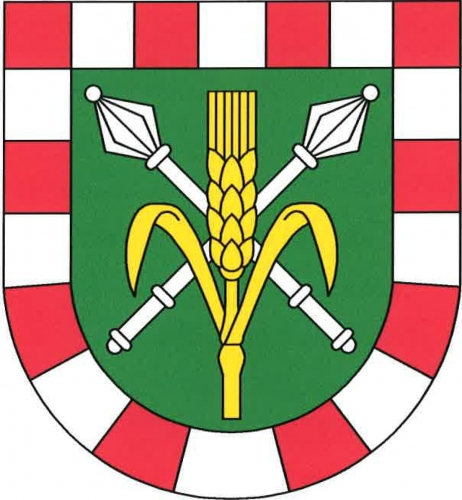
- Flag Coat of arms

- Location in the Czech Republic
- Coordinates: 50°7′44″N 12°24′0″E
- Country: Czech Republic
- Region: Karlovy Vary
- District: Cheb
- First mentioned: 1208

Area
  - Total: 21.70 km^{2} (8.38 sq mi)
- Elevation: 439 m (1,440 ft)

Population (2026-01-01)
  - Total: 484
  - Density: 22.3/km^{2} (57.8/sq mi)
- Time zone: UTC+1 (CET)
  - Summer (DST): UTC+2 (CEST)
- Postal codes: 350 02, 351 34
- Website: www.treben.cz

Třebeň (German: Trebendorf) is a municipality and village in Cheb District in the Karlovy Vary Region of the Czech Republic. It has about 500 inhabitants.

== Administrative division ==
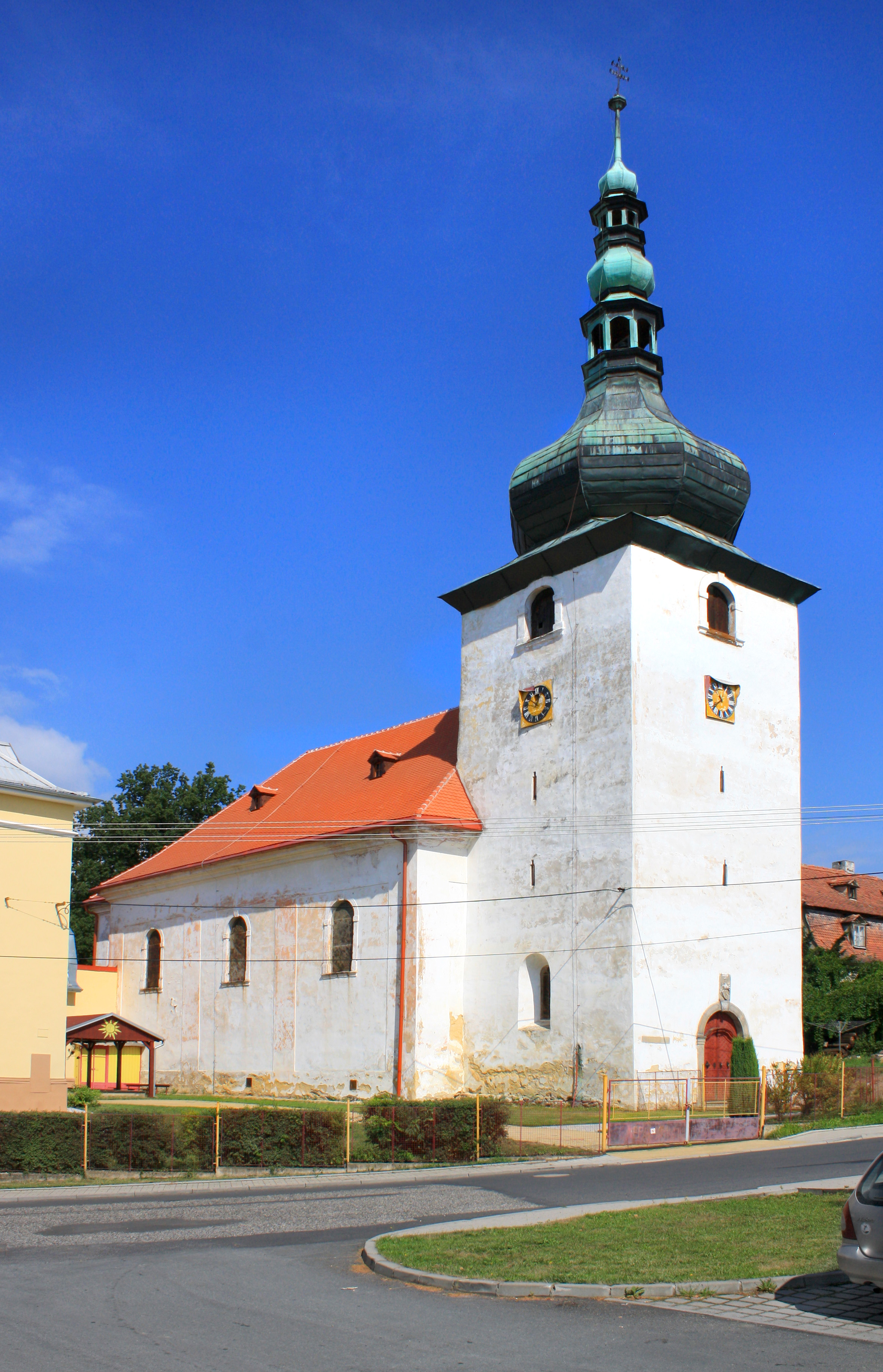
Church of Saint Lawrence

Třebeň consists of ten municipal parts (in brackets population according to the 2021 census):

- Třebeň (203)
- Chocovice (17)
- Doubí (33)
- Dvorek (28)
- Horní Ves (63)
- Lesina (12)
- Lesinka (20)
- Nový Drahov (45)
- Povodí (19)
- Vokov (9)

== History ==
The first written mention of Třebeň is from 1208.

== Demographics ==
Historical population
Year	Pop.	±%
1869	1,321	—
1880	1,533	+16.0%
1890	1,377	−10.2%
1900	1,274	−7.5%
1910	1,326	+4.1%
1921	1,285	−3.1%
1930	1,455	+13.2%
1950	513	−64.7%
1961	453	−11.7%
1970	376	−17.0%
1980	391	+4.0%
1991	321	−17.9%
2001	347	+8.1%
2011	388	+11.8%
2021	449	+15.7%
Source: Censuses
