= Tuřany (Cheb District) =

- Municipality
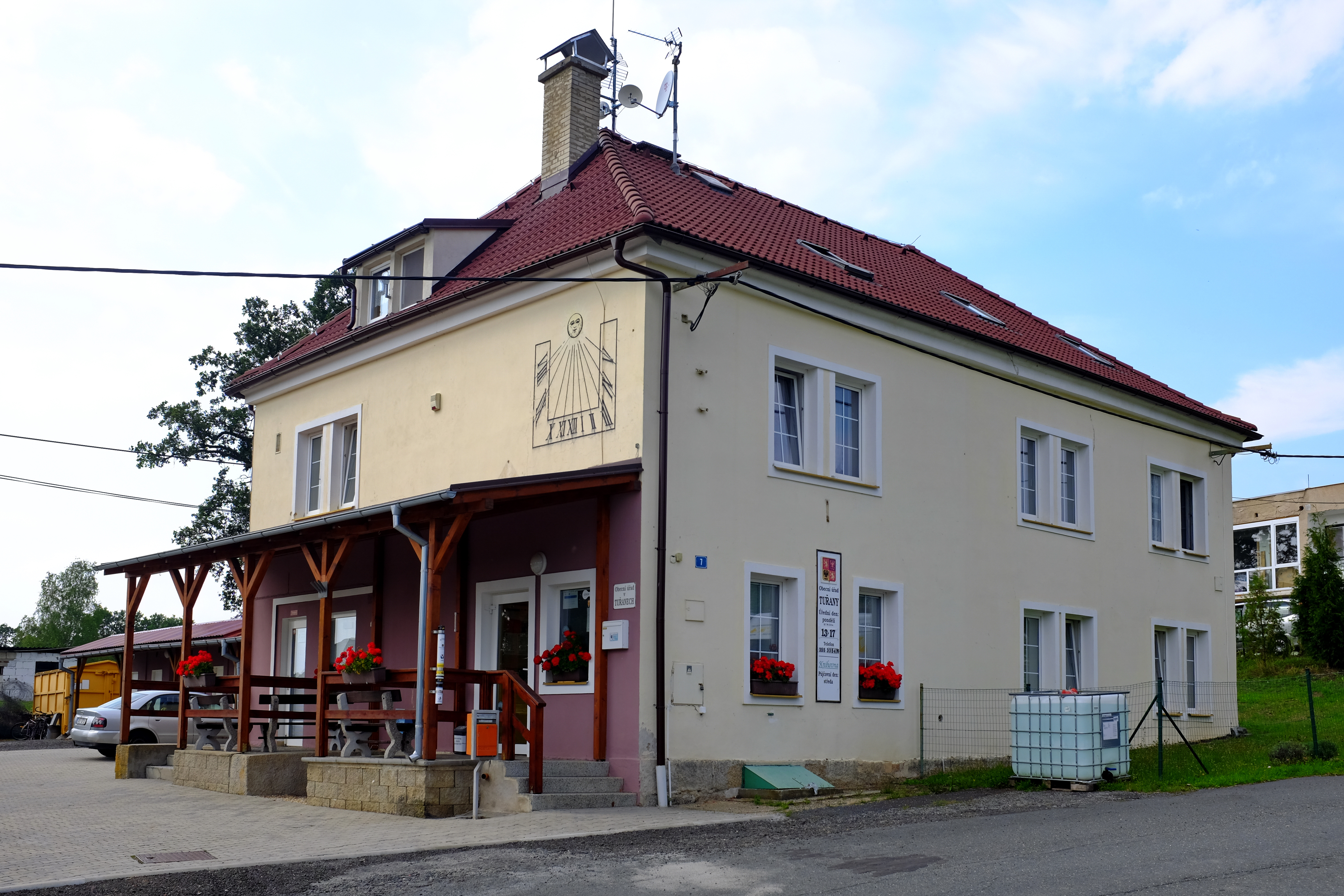
- Municipal office

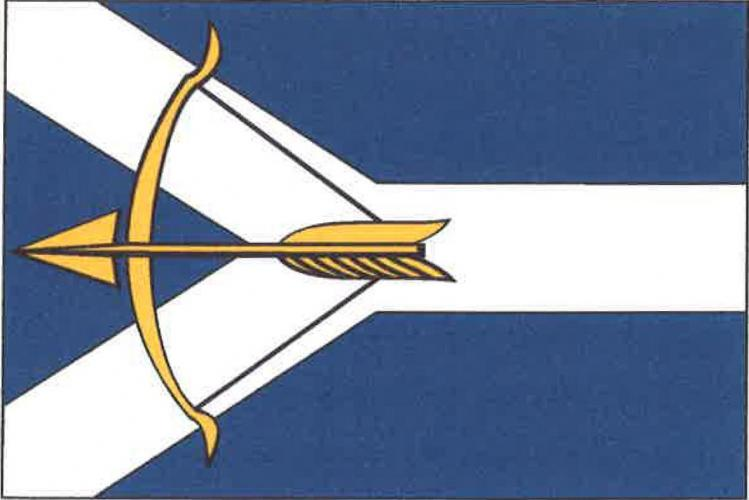
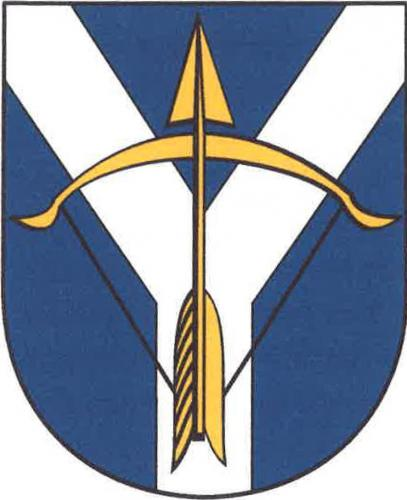
- Flag Coat of arms

- Location in the Czech Republic
- Coordinates: 50°5′3″N 12°31′19″E
- Country: Czech Republic
- Region: Karlovy Vary
- District: Cheb
- First mentioned: 1352

Area
  - Total: 6.11 km^{2} (2.36 sq mi)
- Elevation: 445 m (1,460 ft)

Population (2026-01-01)
  - Total: 137
  - Density: 22.4/km^{2} (58.1/sq mi)
- Time zone: UTC+1 (CET)
  - Summer (DST): UTC+2 (CEST)
- Postal code: 350 02
- Website: www.obec-turany.cz

Tuřany (German: Thurn) is a municipality and village in Cheb District in the Karlovy Vary Region of the Czech Republic. It has about 100 inhabitants.

== Administrative division ==
Tuřany consists of three municipal parts (in brackets population according to the 2021 census):

- Tuřany (50)
- Lipoltov (35)
- Návrší (44)

== Demographics ==
Historical population
Year	Pop.	±%
1869	474	—
1880	463	−2.3%
1890	392	−15.3%
1900	375	−4.3%
1910	398	+6.1%
1921	383	−3.8%
1930	375	−2.1%
1950	166	−55.7%
1961	127	−23.5%
1970	84	−33.9%
1980	110	+31.0%
1991	92	−16.4%
2001	109	+18.5%
2011	130	+19.3%
2021	129	−0.8%
Source: Censuses
