= Cheb District =

Cheb District Okres Cheb
- District
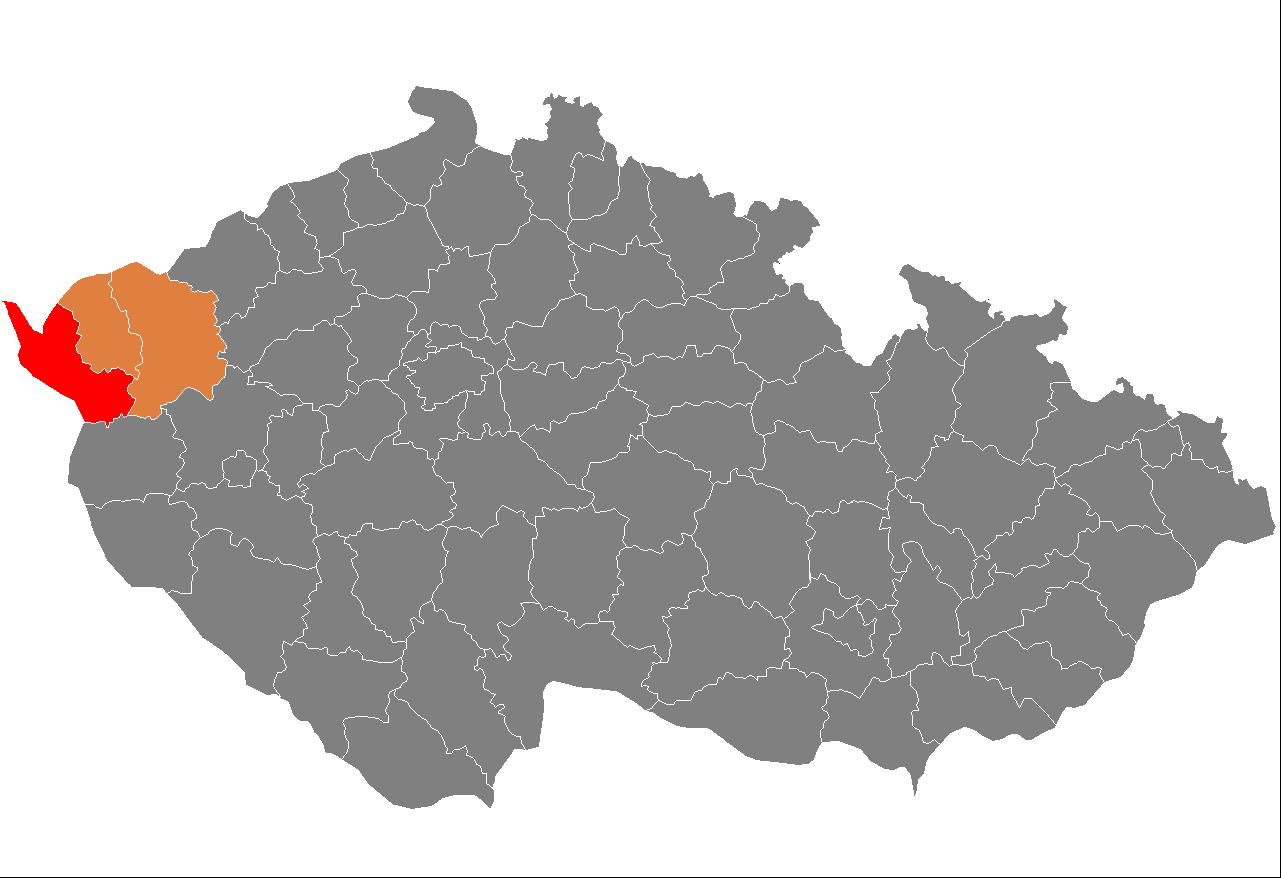
- Location in the Karlovy Vary Region within the Czech Republic

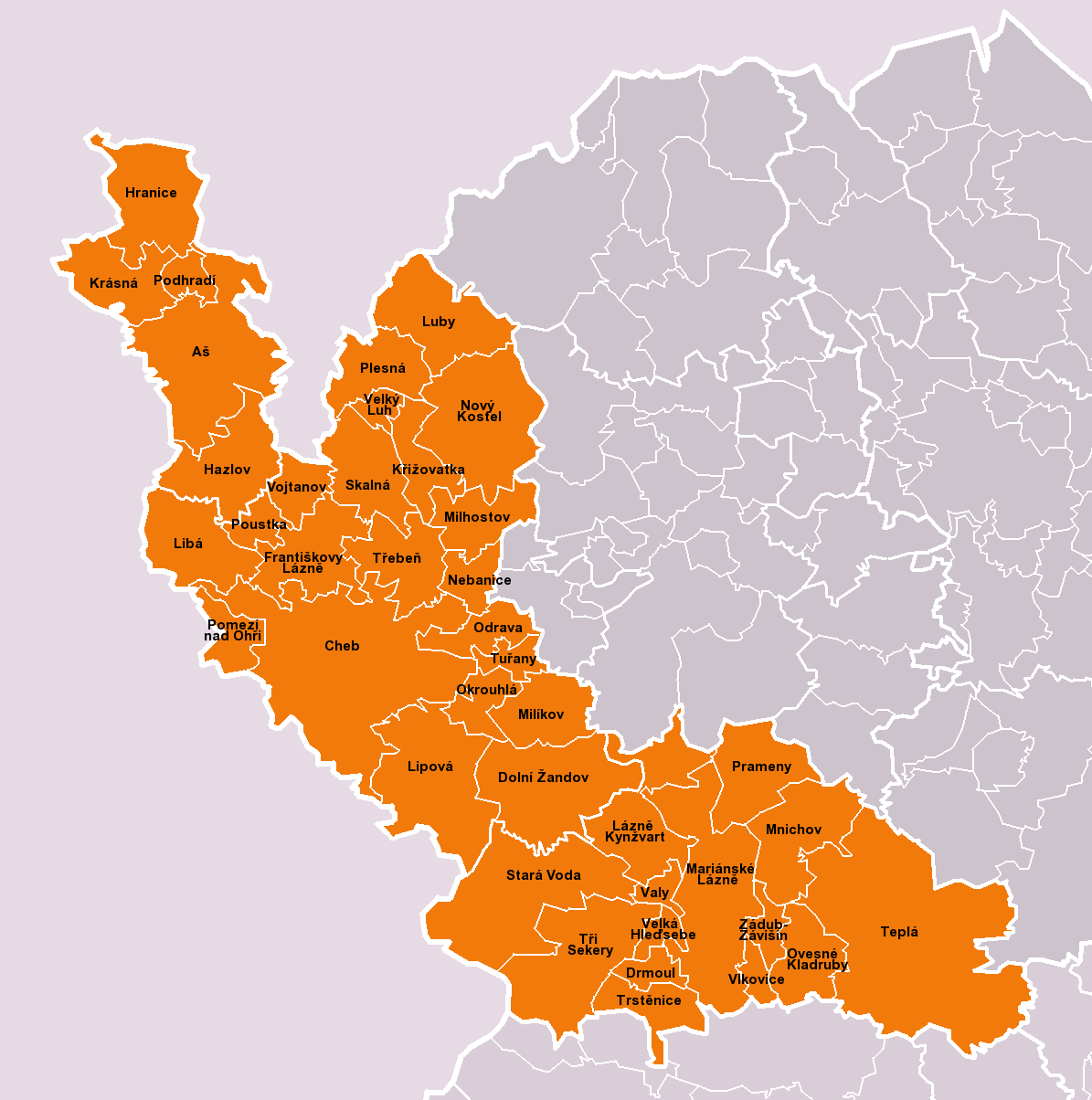
- Coordinates: 50°3′N 12°27′E
- Country: Czech Republic
- Region: Karlovy Vary
- Capital: Cheb

Area
  - Total: 1,045.91 km^{2} (403.83 sq mi)

Population (2026)
  - Total: 93,534
  - Density: 89.428/km^{2} (231.62/sq mi)
- Time zone: UTC+1 (CET)
  - Summer (DST): UTC+2 (CEST)
- Municipalities: 40
- * Towns: 10
- * Market towns: 0

Cheb District (Czech: okres Cheb) is a district in the Karlovy Vary Region of the Czech Republic. Its capital is the town of Cheb. It is the westernmost district of the Czech Republic.

== Administrative division ==
Cheb District is divided into three administrative districts of municipalities with extended competence: Cheb, Aš and Mariánské Lázně.

=== List of municipalities ===
Towns are marked in bold:

Aš - Cheb - Dolní Žandov - Drmoul - Františkovy Lázně - Hazlov - Hranice - Krásná - Křižovatka - Lázně Kynžvart - Libá - Lipová - Luby - Mariánské Lázně - Milhostov - Milíkov - Mnichov - Nebanice - Nový Kostel - Odrava - Okrouhlá - Ovesné Kladruby - Plesná - Podhradí - Pomezí nad Ohří - Poustka - Prameny - Skalná - Stará Voda - Teplá - Třebeň - Tři Sekery - Trstěnice - Tuřany - Valy - Velká Hleďsebe - Velký Luh - Vlkovice - Vojtanov - Zádub-Závišín

== Geography ==
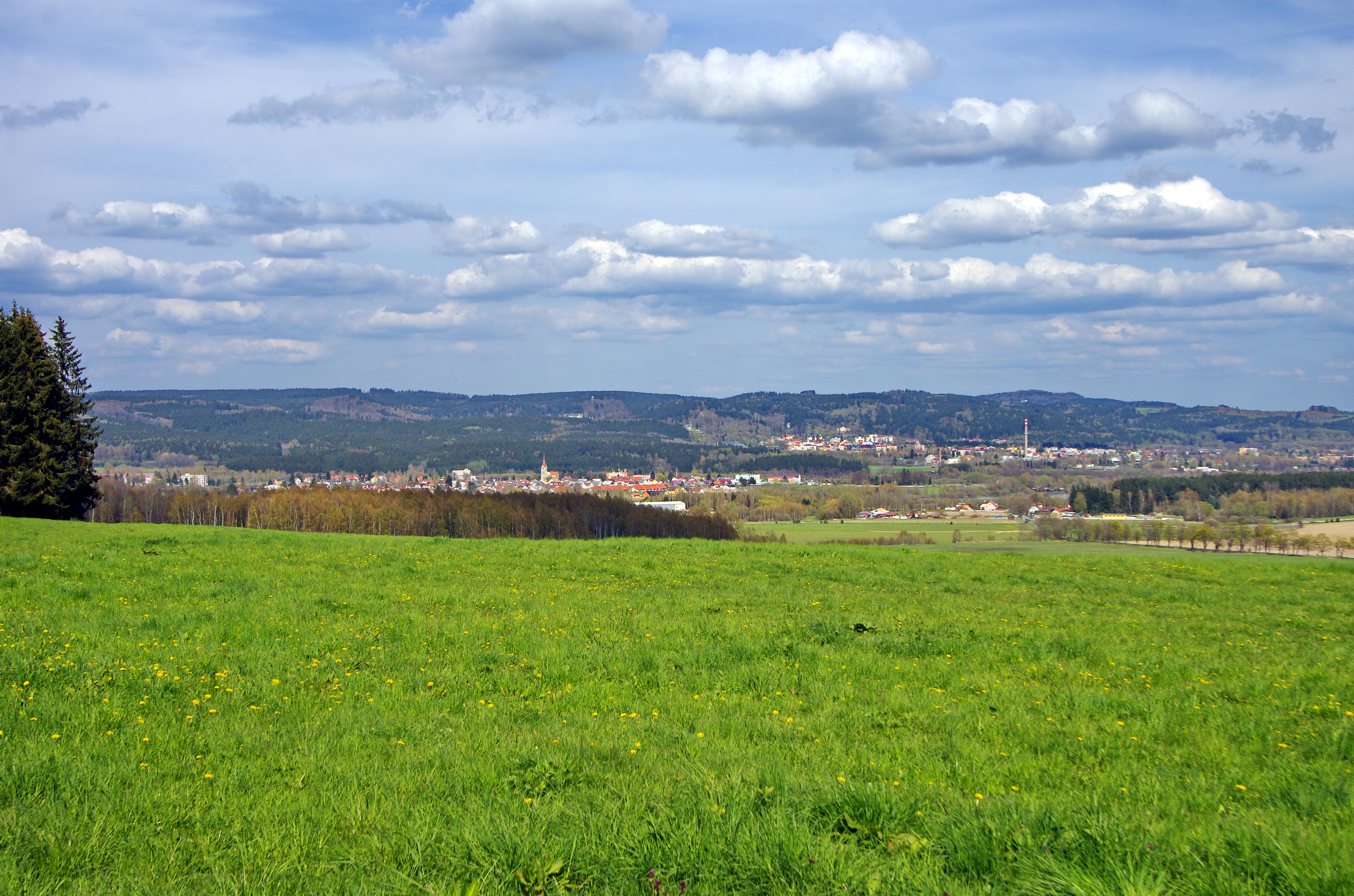
Landscape around Velká Hleďsebe and Mariánské Lázně

Cheb District borders Germany in the west. It includes the Aš Panhandle area, which makes it the westernmost district of the Czech Republic. The relief is very varied and includes both flat plains and hilly areas with relatively high altitudes. The territory extends into seven geomorphological mesoregions: Cheb Basin (centre), Fichtel Mountains (west), Upper Palatine Forest (southwest), Podčeskoleská Hills (south), Teplá Highlands (east), Slavkov Forest (northeast) and Ore Mountains (small part in the north). The highest point of the district is the mountain Lesný in Dolní Žandov with an elevation of 983 m (3,225 ft). The lowest point is the river bed of the Ohře in Odrava at 415 m (1,362 ft).

From the total district area of 1,045.9 km^{2} (403.8 sq mi), agricultural land occupies 501.7 km^{2} (193.7 sq mi), forests occupy 409.9 km^{2} (158.3 sq mi), and water area occupies 32.3 km^{2} (12.5 sq mi). Forests cover 39.2% of the district's area.

The most important river is the Ohře, which flows across the district from west to east. Its longest tributary in the area are the rivers Plesná and Teplá. The rivers White Elster and Wondreb originate here and head to Germany. The Röslau briefly forms the Czech–German border before its confluence with the Ohře. The largest bodies of water are two reservoirs: Jesenice, built on the Wondreb, and Skalka, built on the Ohře.

There is one protected landscape area, located in the east of the district: Slavkovský les.

== Demographics ==
Historical population

Year	Pop.	±%
1869	111,277	—
1880	124,429	+11.8%
1890	127,209	+2.2%
1900	138,637	+9.0%
1910	154,522	+11.5%

Year	Pop.	±%
1921	146,830	−5.0%
1930	163,536	+11.4%
1950	74,972	−54.2%
1961	79,743	+6.4%
1970	85,516	+7.2%

Year	Pop.	±%
1980	90,465	+5.8%
1991	89,856	−0.7%
2001	91,839	+2.2%
2011	90,188	−1.8%
2021	86,411	−4.2%

Source: Censuses

=== Most populous municipalities ===
Name	Population	Area (km^{2})
Cheb	32,892	96
Mariánské Lázně	13,921	52
Aš	12,683	56
Františkovy Lázně	5,648	26
Teplá	2,909	113
Velká Hleďsebe	2,483	5
Luby	2,147	31
Hranice	2,070	32
Plesná	1,890	19
Skalná	1,875	23

== Economy ==
The largest employers with headquarters in Cheb District and at least 500 employees are:

Economic entity	Location	Number of employees	Main activity
Františkovy Lázně Aquaforum	Františkovy Lázně	500–999	Health care
Elektrometall	Mariánské Lázně	500–999	Automotive industry
Léčebné lázně Mariánské Lázně	Mariánské Lázně	500–999	Health care

== Transport ==
The D6 motorway from Prague to Karlovy Vary and Cheb (part of the European routes E48 and E49) forks and continues to the Czech–German border to the west (as E48) and to the north (as E49).

== Sights ==
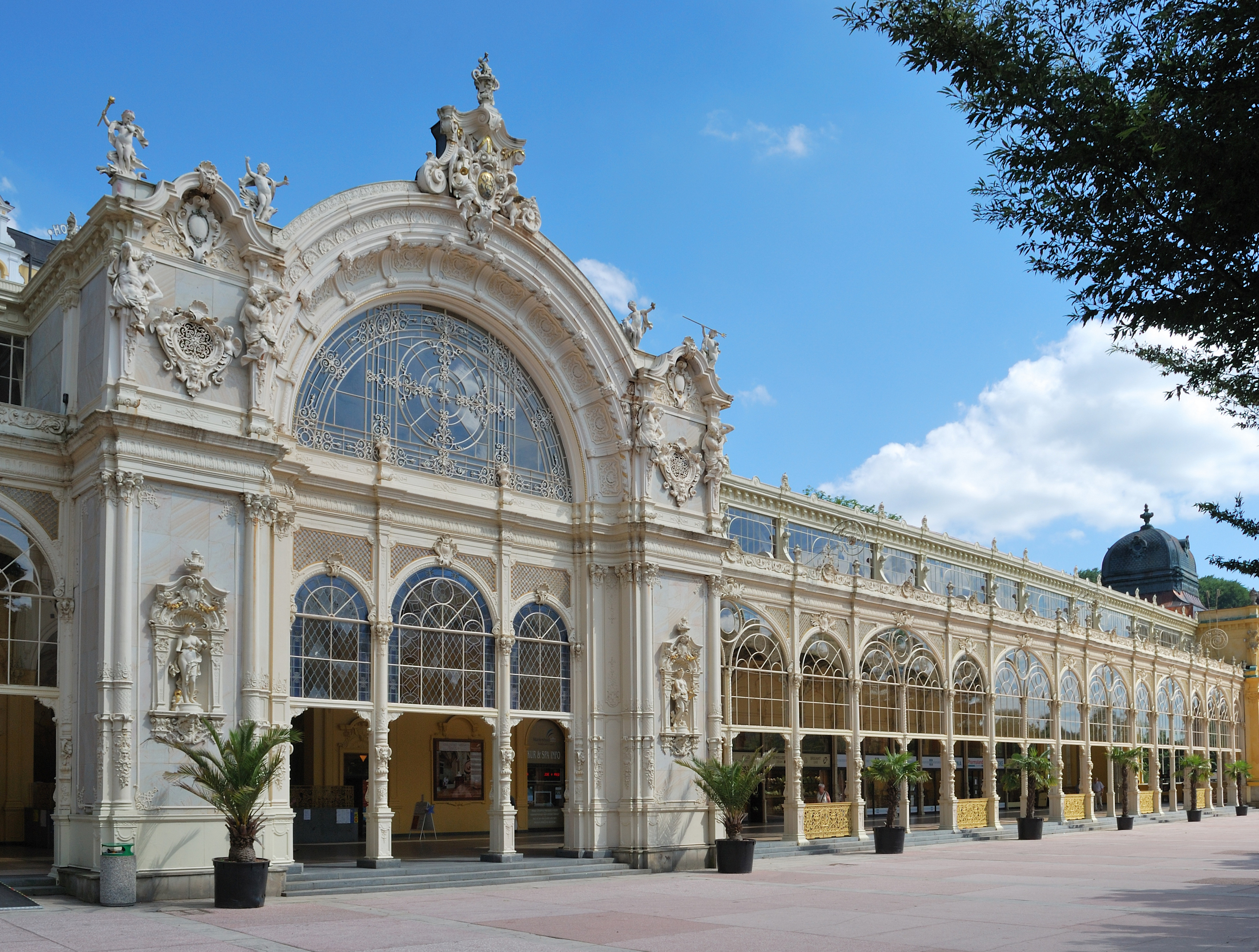
Spa colonnade in Mariánské Lázně

The town centres of Mariánské Lázně and Františkovy Lázně with the spa cultural landscapes were designated a UNESCO World Heritage Site in 2021 as part of the transnational Great Spa Towns of Europe because of its springs and architectural testimony to the popularity of spa towns in Europe during the 18th through 20th centuries.

The most important monuments in the district, protected as national cultural monuments, are:

- Kynžvart Castle
- Kynžvart Daguerreotype
- Teplá Abbey
- Spa colonnade in Mariánské Lázně
- Artificial water channel Dlouhá stoka (partly)
- Cheb Castle

The best-preserved settlements and landscapes, protected as monument reservations and monument zones, are:

- Cheb (monument reservation)
- Františkovy Lázně (monument reservation)
- Mariánské Lázně (monument reservation)
- Doubrava (monument reservation)
- Nový Drahov (monument reservation)
- Teplá
- Beranov
- Dolní Lažany
- Popovice
- Salajna
- Landscape around Kladská

The most visited tourist destinations are the Boheminium miniature park in Mariánské Lázně, Soos national nature reserve in Skalná, Cheb Castle, and Kynžvart Castle.
