= Poustka =

- Municipality
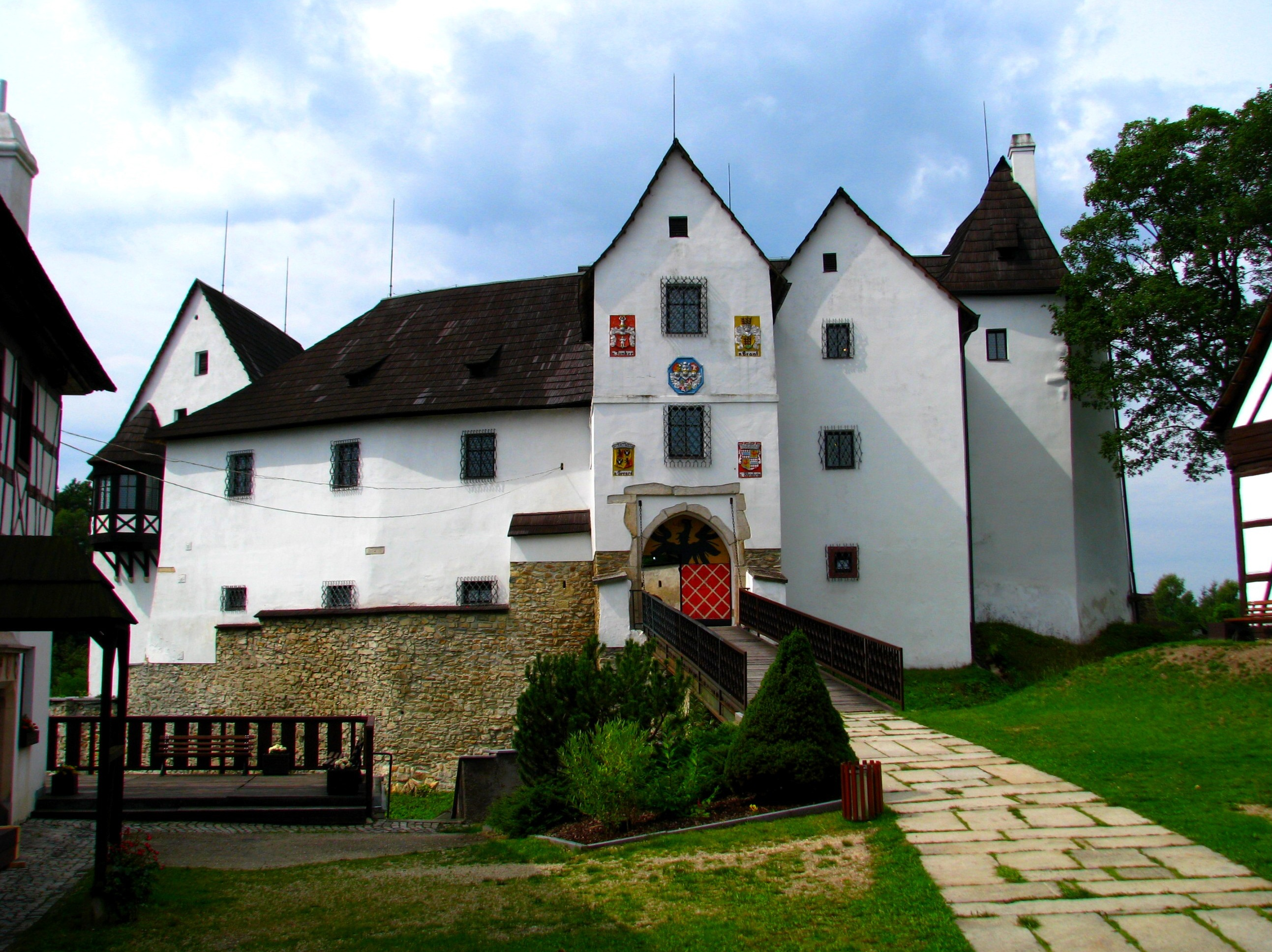
- Seeberg Castle

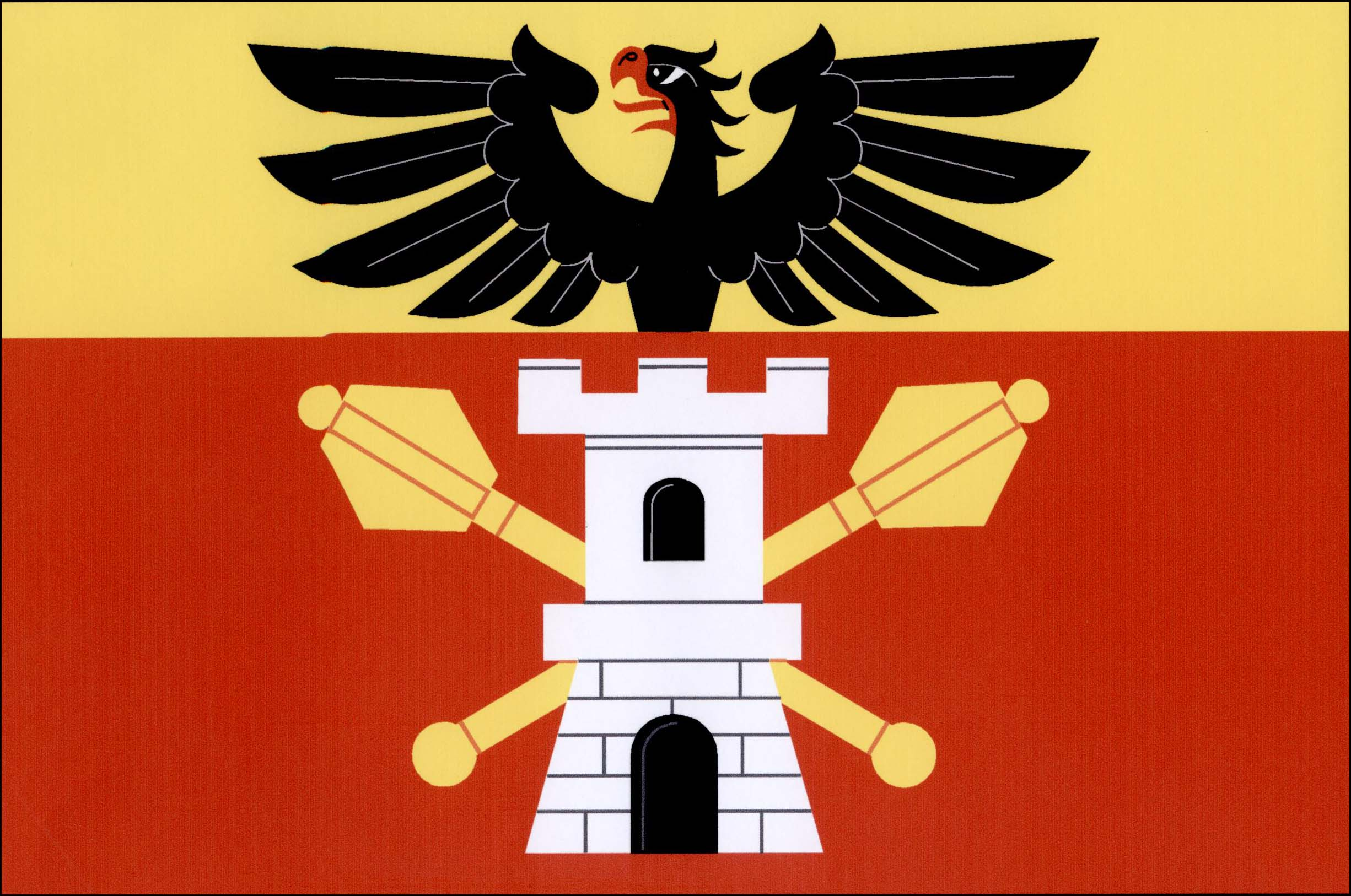
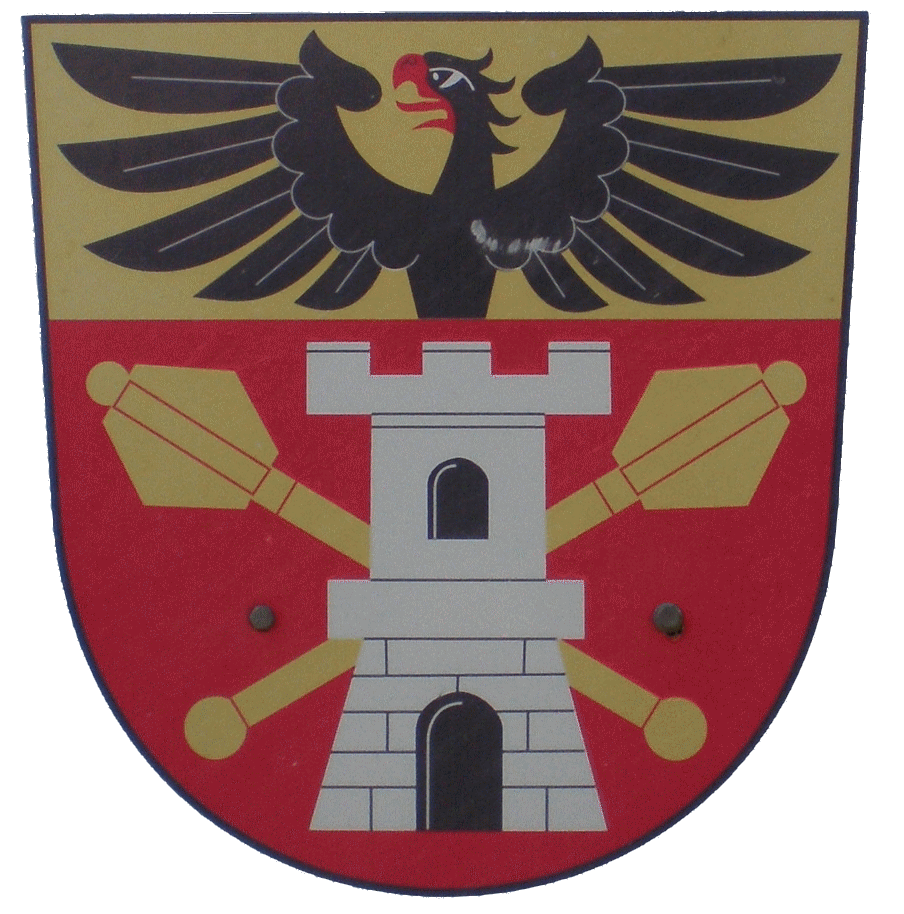
- Flag Coat of arms

- Location in the Czech Republic
- Coordinates: 50°8′25″N 12°17′54″E
- Country: Czech Republic
- Region: Karlovy Vary
- District: Cheb
- First mentioned: 1275

Area
  - Total: 6.98 km^{2} (2.69 sq mi)
- Elevation: 515 m (1,690 ft)

Population (2026-01-01)
  - Total: 170
  - Density: 24/km^{2} (63/sq mi)
- Time zone: UTC+1 (CET)
  - Summer (DST): UTC+2 (CEST)
- Postal code: 350 02
- Website: www.poustka.cz

Poustka (German: Oed) is a municipality and village in Cheb District in the Karlovy Vary Region of the Czech Republic. It has about 200 inhabitants. It is known for the Seeberg Castle.

== Administrative division ==
Poustka consists of two municipal parts (in brackets population according to the 2021 census):

- Poustka (79)
- Ostroh (80)

== Etymology ==
The Czech word poustka denoted lonely house or abandoned house. The Middle High German word einôti (in modern German Einöde), which gave rise to the German name of the settlement Oed, had the same meaning.

== Geography ==
Poustka is located about 8 kilometres (5 mi) northwest of Cheb and 40 km (25 mi) west of Karlovy Vary. It lies in the Fichtel Mountains. The highest point is the hill Kozinec at 551 m (1,808 ft) above sea level. The stream Slatinný potok flows through the municipality.

== History ==
The first written mention of Poustka is from 1275. Ostroh was first mentioned in 1322. The villages developed typically for the castle grounds, they provided the background for the castle. Farmers and people working at the castle lived here. It used to be a strategic point, but later the original function of the castle changed and it became mainly an administrative centre. Among the notable owners of the castle were the families of Schlick, Juncker, Zedtwitz and Nostitz.

== Demographics ==
Historical population

Year	Pop.	±%
1869	734	—
1880	806	+9.8%
1890	734	−8.9%
1900	662	−9.8%
1910	660	−0.3%

Year	Pop.	±%
1921	542	−17.9%
1930	552	+1.8%
1950	148	−73.2%
1961	115	−22.3%
1970	109	−5.2%

Year	Pop.	±%
1980	114	+4.6%
1991	99	−13.2%
2001	117	+18.2%
2011	153	+30.8%
2021	159	+3.9%

Source: Censuses

== Transport ==
The I/64 road from Františkovy Lázně to the Czech–German border in Aš runs through the municipality.

== Sights ==
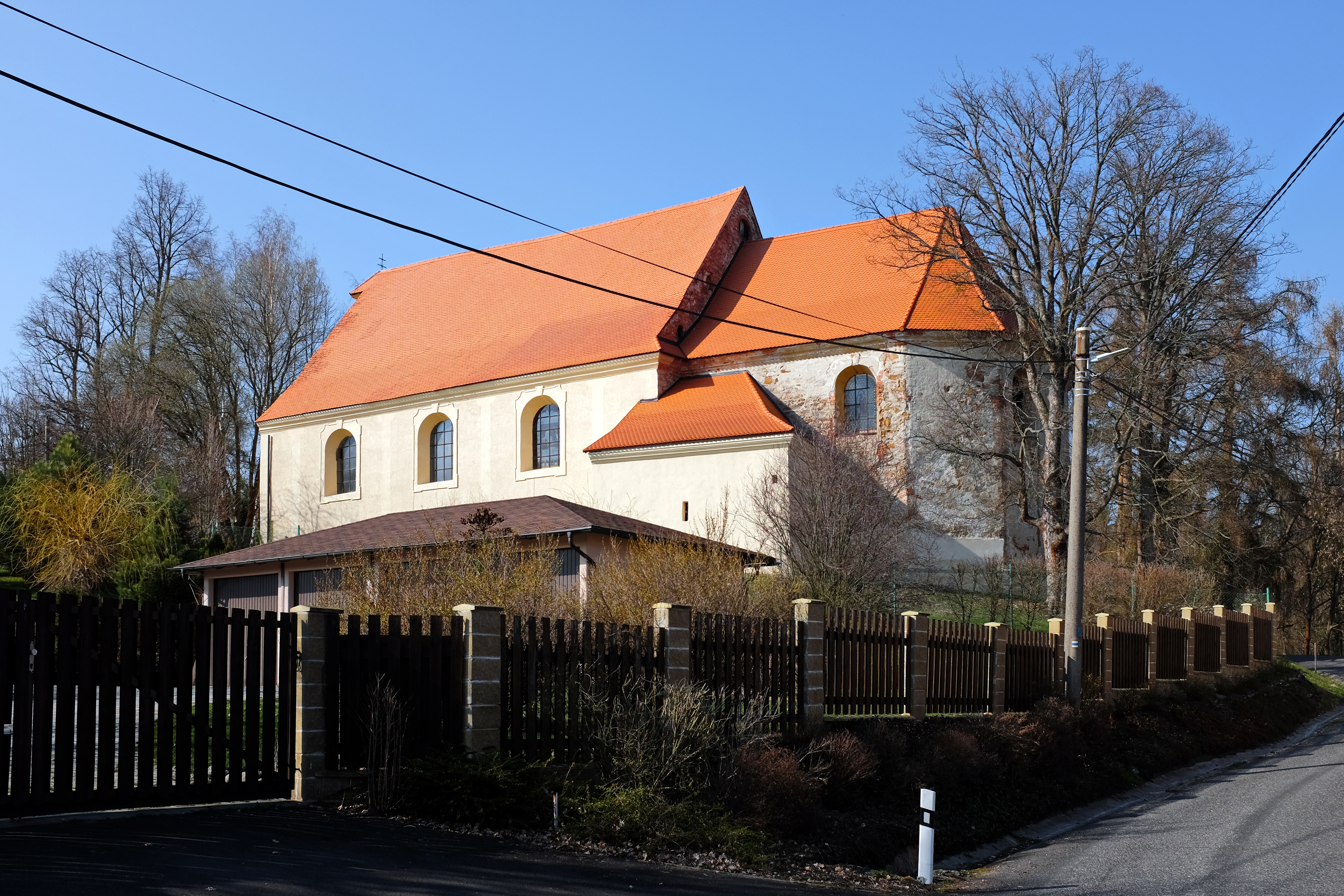
Church of Saint Wolfgang

The main landmark of the municipality is the Seeberg Castle in Ostroh. It was built between 1250 and 1275. It originally served as a ministerial castle. The original Romanesque castle was later rebuilt in Gothic and Renaissance styles. It consists of a Romanesque and Gothic palace with a Renaissance wing. Today the castle is open to the public.

The Church of Saint Wolfgang was built in the Gothic style in 1470–1478. It was rebuilt in the Baroque style in 1721–1724.
