= Pomezí nad Ohří =

- Municipality
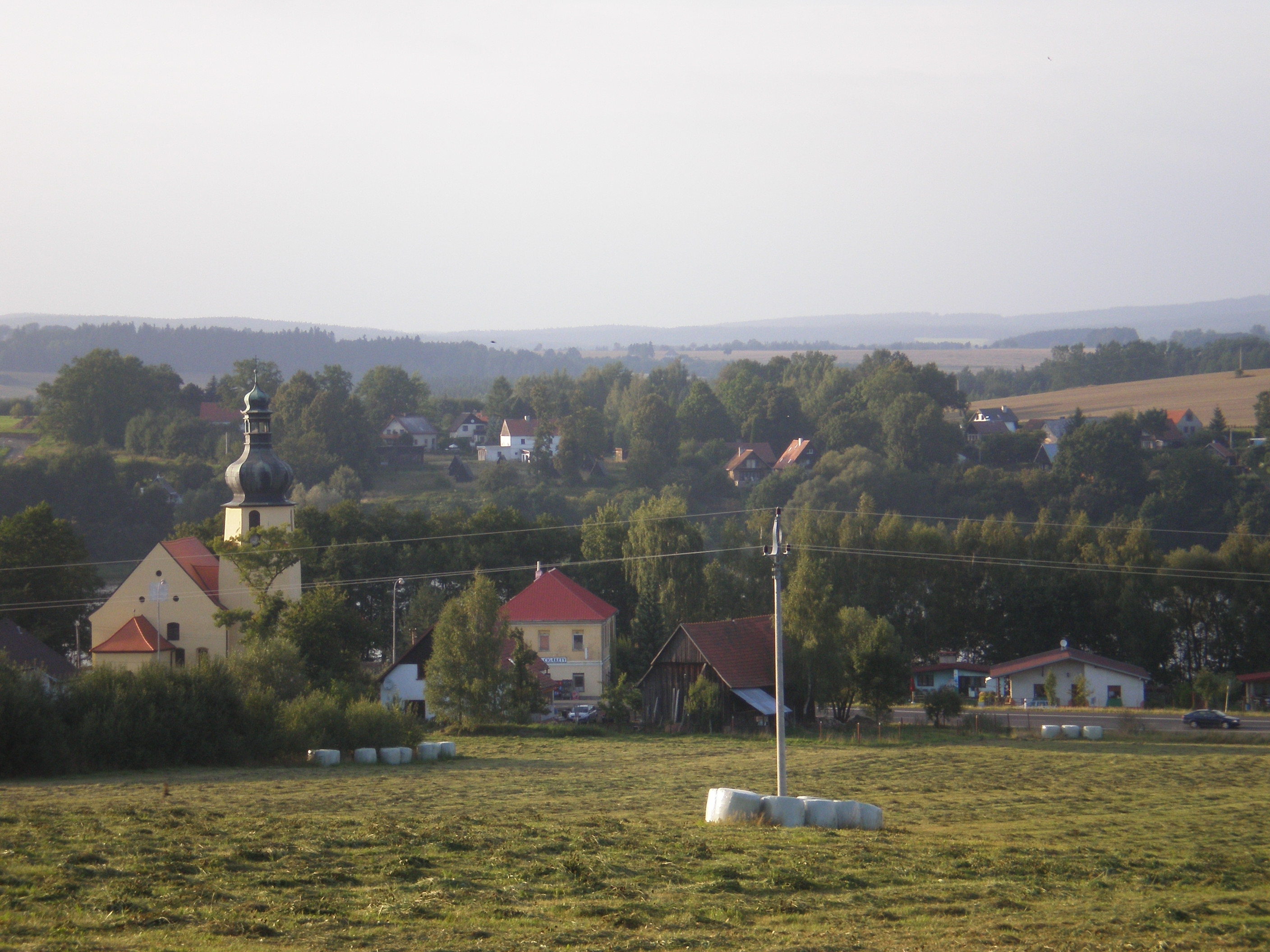
- General view

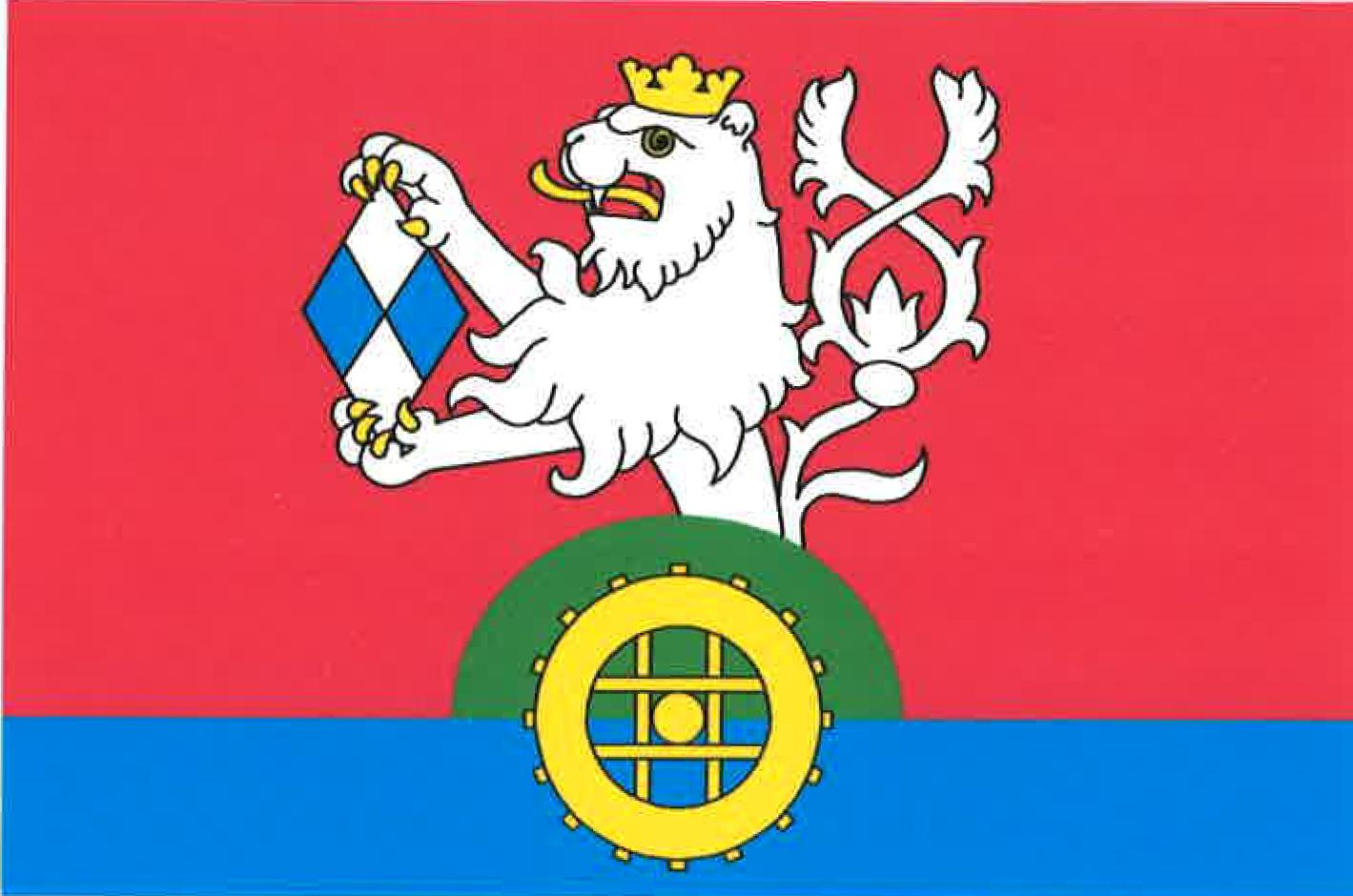
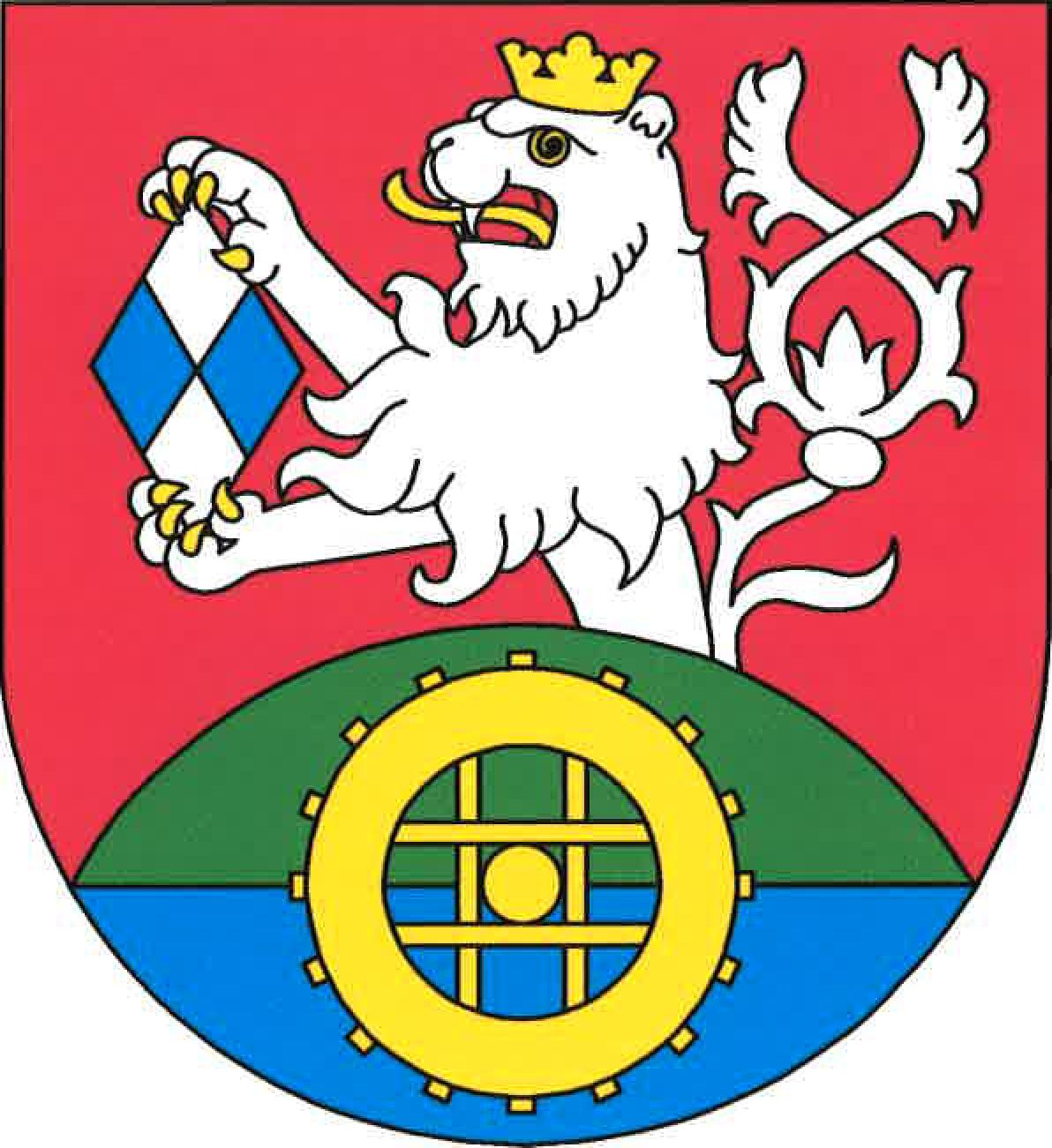
- Flag Coat of arms

- Location in the Czech Republic
- Coordinates: 50°5′9″N 12°17′3″E
- Country: Czech Republic
- Region: Karlovy Vary
- District: Cheb
- First mentioned: 1370

Area
  - Total: 10.69 km^{2} (4.13 sq mi)
- Elevation: 468 m (1,535 ft)

Population (2026-01-01)
  - Total: 378
  - Density: 35.4/km^{2} (91.6/sq mi)
- Time zone: UTC+1 (CET)
  - Summer (DST): UTC+2 (CEST)
- Postal code: 350 02
- Website: www.pomezinadohri.cz

Pomezí nad Ohří (German: Mühlbach) is a municipality and village in Cheb District in the Karlovy Vary Region of the Czech Republic. It has about 400 inhabitants.

== Administrative division ==
Pomezí nad Ohří consists of two municipal parts (in brackets population according to the 2021 census):

- Pomezí nad Ohří (186)
- Hraničná (119)

== Demographics ==
Historical population
Year	Pop.	±%
1869	759	—
1880	814	+7.2%
1890	653	−19.8%
1900	646	−1.1%
1910	701	+8.5%
1921	625	−10.8%
1930	667	+6.7%
1950	159	−76.2%
1961	128	−19.5%
1970	137	+7.0%
1980	112	−18.2%
1991	57	−49.1%
2001	74	+29.8%
2011	151	+104.1%
2021	305	+102.0%
Source: Censuses
