= Zádub-Závišín =

- Municipality
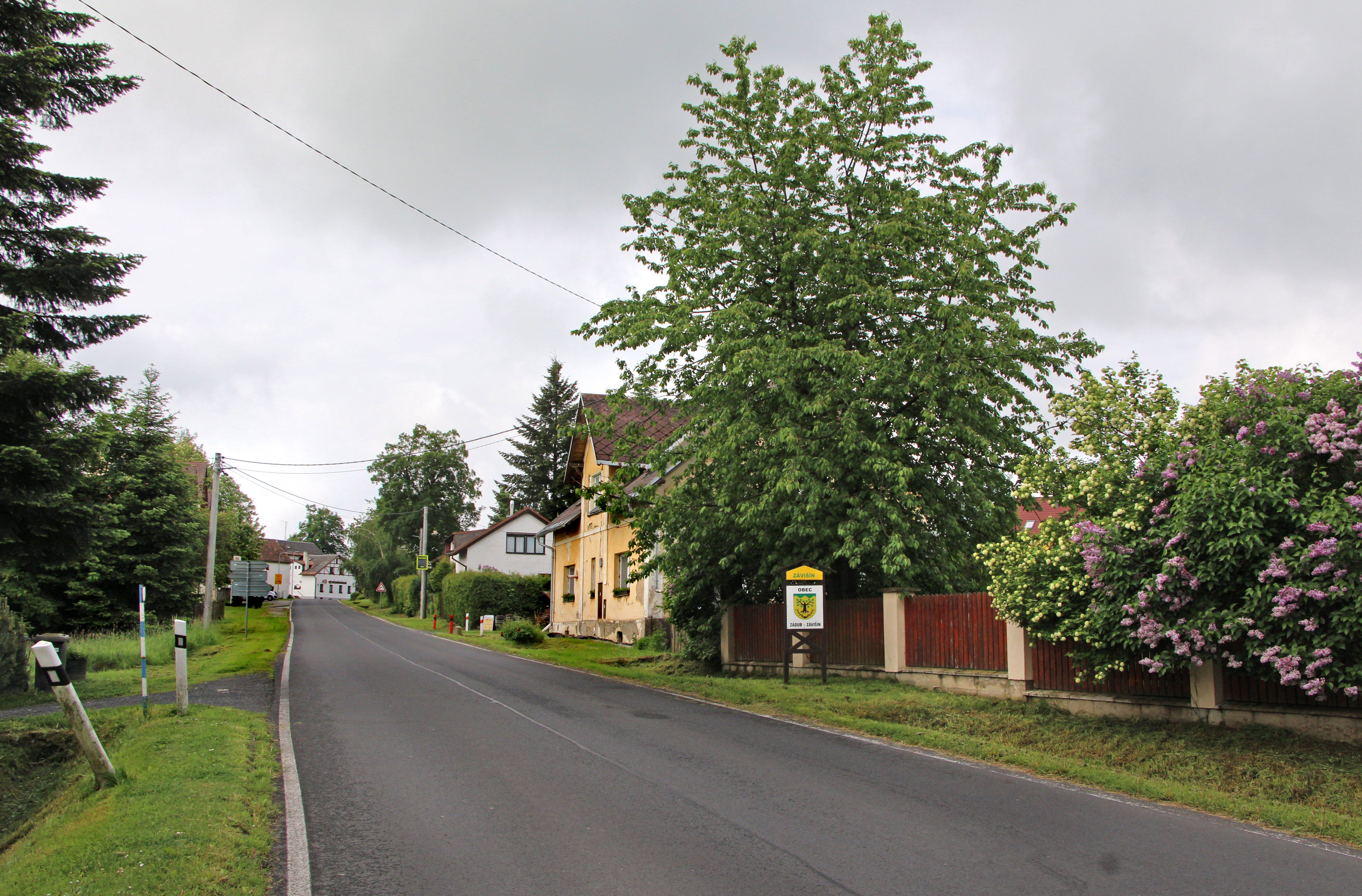
- Main street

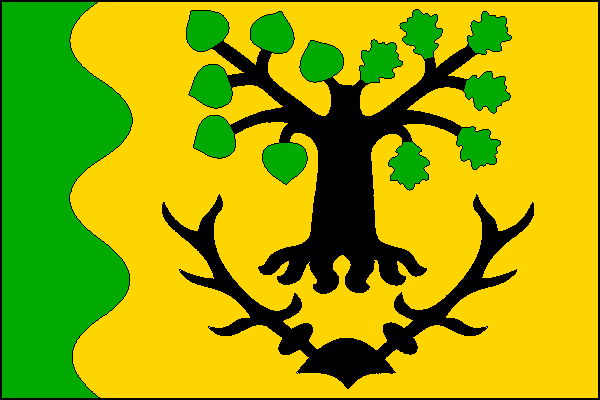
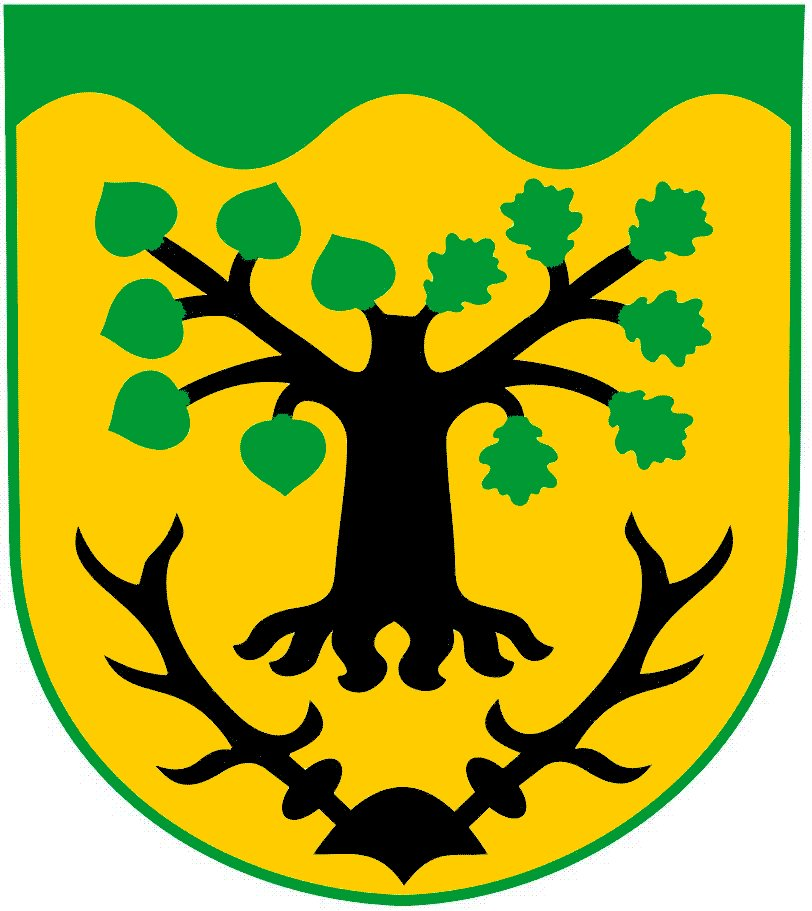
- Flag Coat of arms

- Location in the Czech Republic
- Coordinates: 49°58′16″N 12°44′36″E
- Country: Czech Republic
- Region: Karlovy Vary
- District: Cheb
- First mentioned: 1273

Area
  - Total: 6.33 km^{2} (2.44 sq mi)
- Elevation: 760 m (2,490 ft)

Population (2026-01-01)
  - Total: 430
  - Density: 68/km^{2} (180/sq mi)
- Time zone: UTC+1 (CET)
  - Summer (DST): UTC+2 (CEST)
- Postal code: 353 01
- Website: www.zadubzavisin.cz

Zádub-Závišín (German: Hohendorf-Abaschin) is a municipality in Cheb District in the Karlovy Vary Region of the Czech Republic. It has about 400 inhabitants.

== Administrative division ==
Zádub-Závišín consists of three municipal parts (in brackets population according to the 2021 census):

- Zádub (196)
- Závišín (89)
- Milhostov (46)

== Demographics ==
Historical population
Year	Pop.	±%
1869	599	—
1880	737	+23.0%
1890	814	+10.4%
1900	897	+10.2%
1910	1,114	+24.2%
1921	949	−14.8%
1930	1,052	+10.9%
1950	515	−51.0%
1961	413	−19.8%
1970	328	−20.6%
1980	277	−15.5%
1991	257	−7.2%
2001	263	+2.3%
2011	308	+17.1%
2021	331	+7.5%
Source: Censuses
