= Velká Hleďsebe =

- Municipality
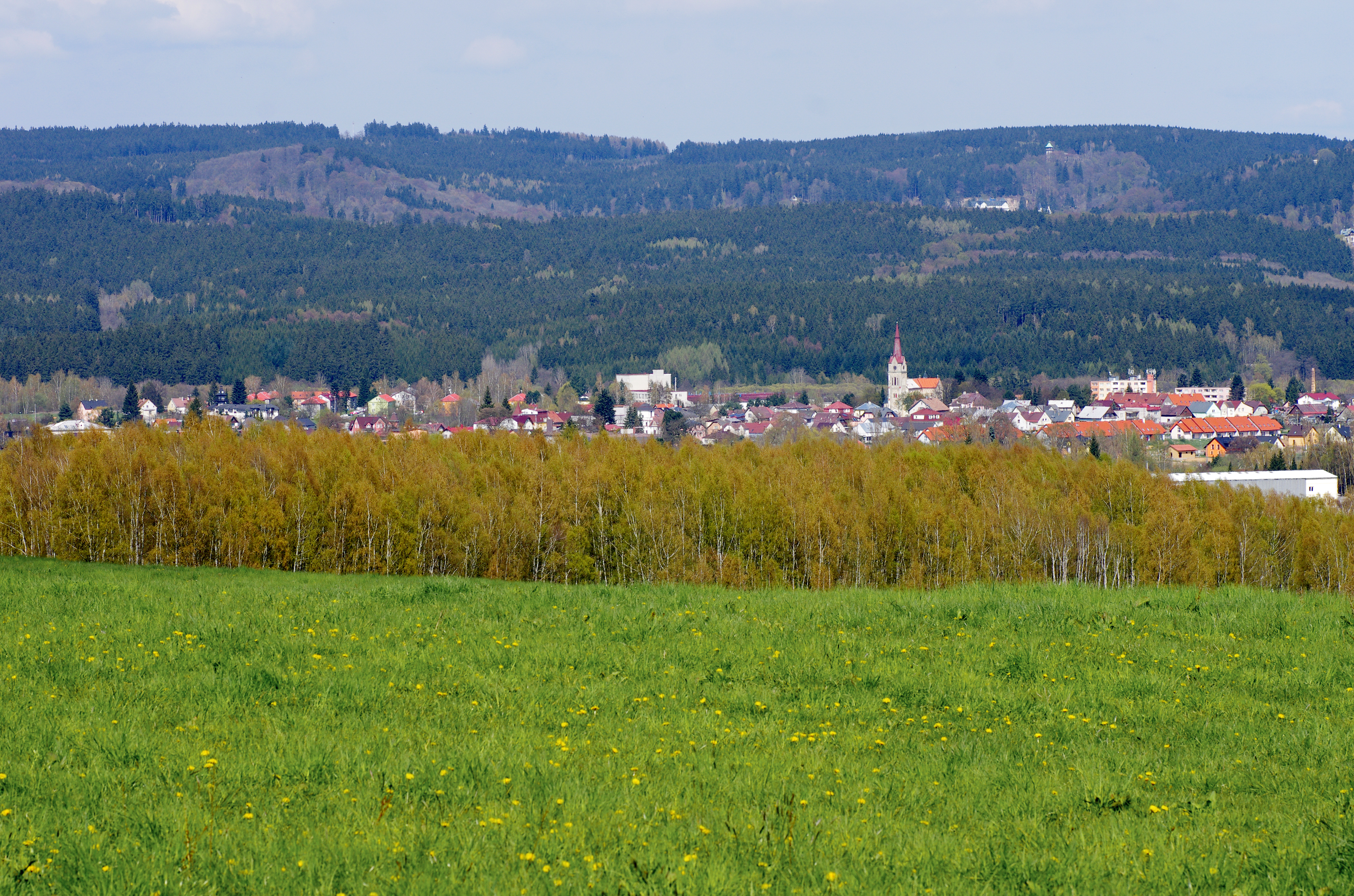
- View from the west

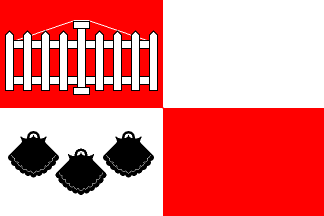
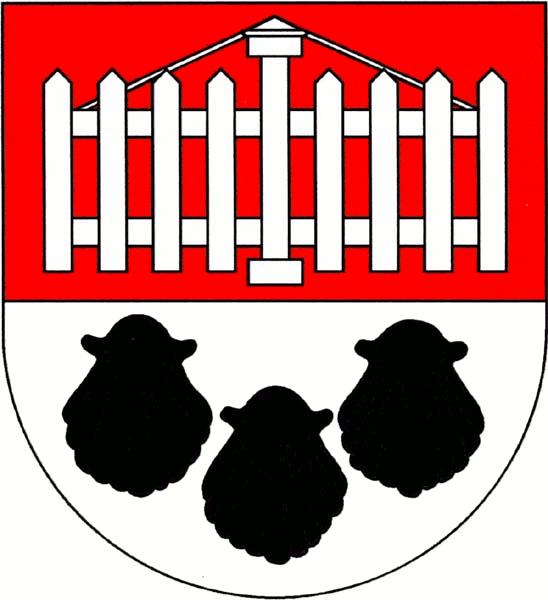
- Flag Coat of arms

- Location in the Czech Republic
- Coordinates: 49°57′42″N 12°40′4″E
- Country: Czech Republic
- Region: Karlovy Vary
- District: Cheb
- First mentioned: 1587

Area
  - Total: 4.56 km^{2} (1.76 sq mi)
- Elevation: 561 m (1,841 ft)

Population (2026-01-01)
  - Total: 2,483
  - Density: 545/km^{2} (1,410/sq mi)
- Time zone: UTC+1 (CET)
  - Summer (DST): UTC+2 (CEST)
- Postal code: 354 71
- Website: www.velkahledsebe.cz

Velká Hleďsebe (German: Groß Sichdichfür) is a municipality and village in Cheb District in the Karlovy Vary Region of the Czech Republic. It has about 2,500 inhabitants.

== Administrative division ==
Velká Hleďsebe consists of three municipal parts (in brackets population according to the 2021 census):

- Velká Hleďsebe (1,632)
- Klimentov (601)
- Malá Hleďsebe (20)

== Etymology ==
The name Hleďsebe is derived from the Czech expression hleď sebe, meaning 'watch out'. The village was probably named so by the neighbours so that everyone would beware that dangerous people live there. The names Velká Hleďsebe and Malá Hleďsebe mean 'great Hleďsebe' and 'small Hleďsebe'.

== Geography ==
Velká Hleďsebe is located about 24 kilometres (15 mi) southeast of Cheb and 32 km (20 mi) southwest of Karlovy Vary, in close proximity to Mariánské Lázně. The municipal territory lies mostly in the Podčeskoleská Hills, but the southwestern part with the village of Malá Hleďsebe extends in the Upper Palatine Forest. The highest point is at 632 m (2,073 ft) above sea level. The stream Kosový potok flows along the northern and eastern municipal border.

== History ==
The first written mention of Hleďsebe is from 1587. In 1605, Velká Hleďsebe and Malá Hleďsebe were distinguished. Until 1606, both villages belonged to the Tachov estate.

== Demographics ==
Historical population

Year	Pop.	±%
1869	959	—
1880	1,237	+29.0%
1890	1,464	+18.4%
1900	1,962	+34.0%
1910	2,605	+32.8%

Year	Pop.	±%
1921	2,517	−3.4%
1930	2,924	+16.2%
1950	1,218	−58.3%
1961	1,946	+59.8%
1970	1,786	−8.2%

Year	Pop.	±%
1980	2,214	+24.0%
1991	2,113	−4.6%
2001	2,124	+0.5%
2011	2,106	−0.8%
2021	2,253	+7.0%

Source: Censuses

== Transport ==
The I/21 road, which connects the D5 and D6 motorways, runs through the municipality.

== Sights ==
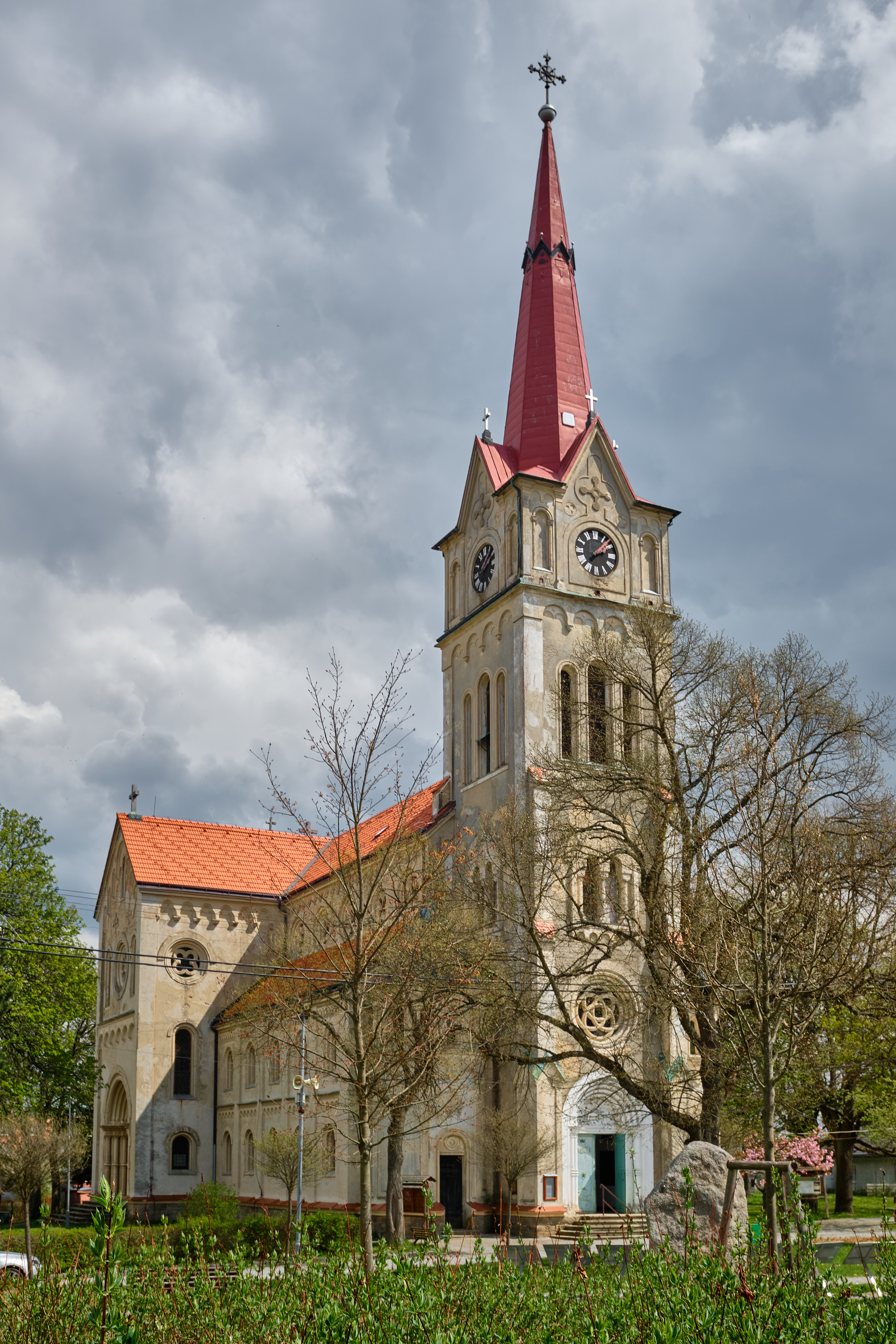
Church of Saint Anne

The main landmark of Velká Hleďsebe is the Church of Saint Anne. It was built in the Neo-Romanesque and Neo-Gothic styles in 1908–1911. It is a romantic imitation of a medieval longitudinal church.
