= Prameny =

- Municipality
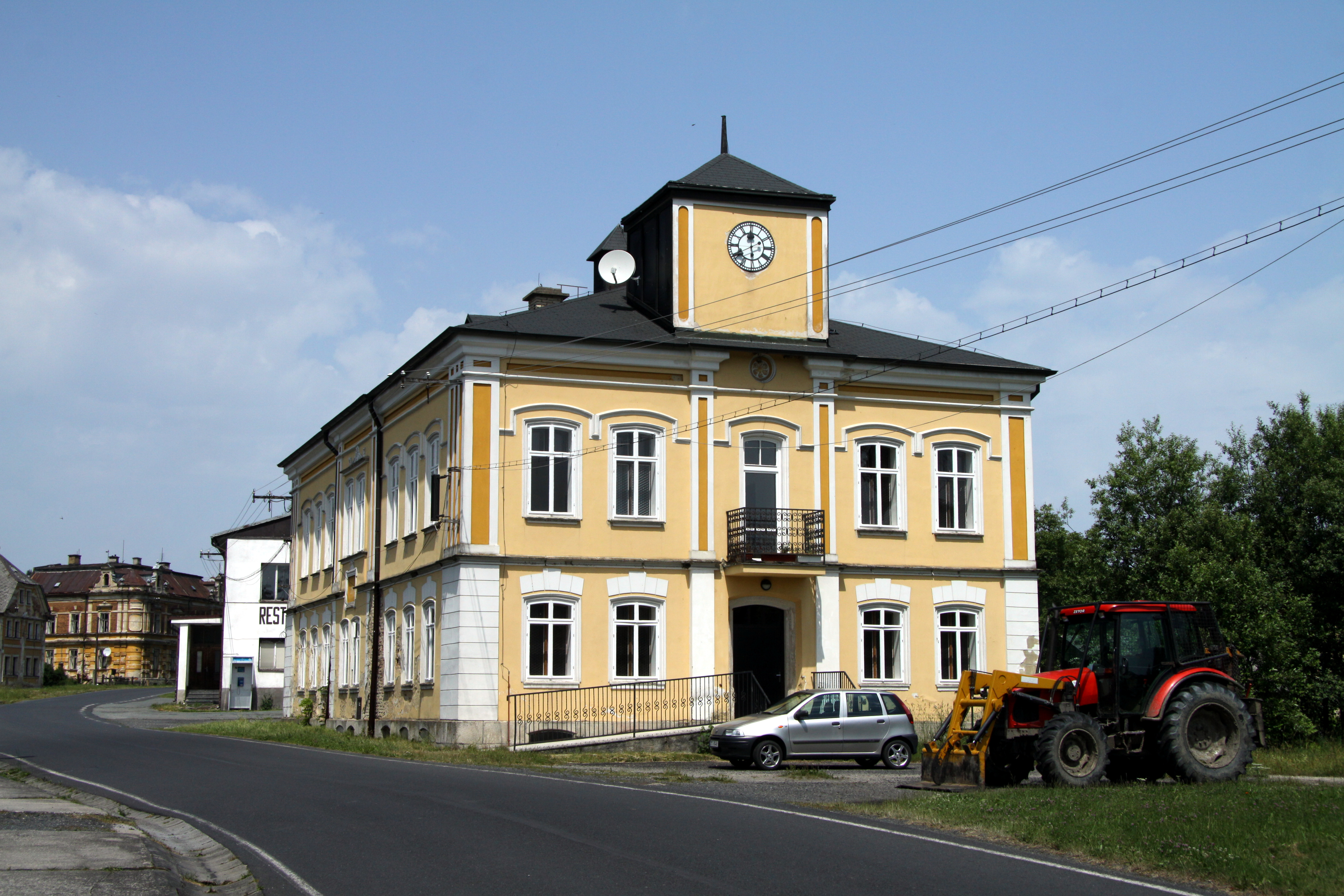
- Former municipal office

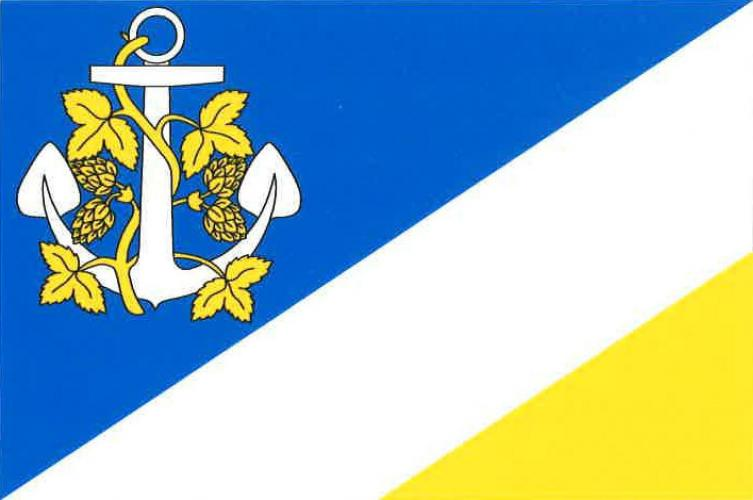
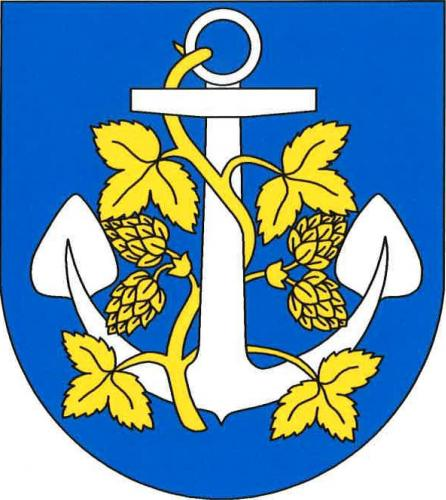
- Flag Coat of arms

- Location in the Czech Republic
- Coordinates: 50°3′0″N 12°43′58″E
- Country: Czech Republic
- Region: Karlovy Vary
- District: Cheb
- First mentioned: 1357

Area
  - Total: 24.61 km^{2} (9.50 sq mi)
- Elevation: 725 m (2,379 ft)

Population (2026-01-01)
  - Total: 89
  - Density: 3.6/km^{2} (9.4/sq mi)
- Time zone: UTC+1 (CET)
  - Summer (DST): UTC+2 (CEST)
- Postal code: 353 01
- Website: pramenyobec.cz

Prameny (German: Sangerberg) is a municipality and village in Cheb District in the Karlovy Vary Region of the Czech Republic. It has about 90 inhabitants.

== Demographics ==
Historical population
Year	Pop.	±%
1869	2,335	—
1880	2,415	+3.4%
1890	2,161	−10.5%
1900	1,947	−9.9%
1910	1,784	−8.4%
1921	1,381	−22.6%
1930	1,527	+10.6%
1950	300	−80.4%
1961	181	−39.7%
1970	271	+49.7%
1980	232	−14.4%
1991	135	−41.8%
2001	144	+6.7%
2011	109	−24.3%
2021	92	−15.6%
Source: Censuses
