= Vlkovice =

- Municipality
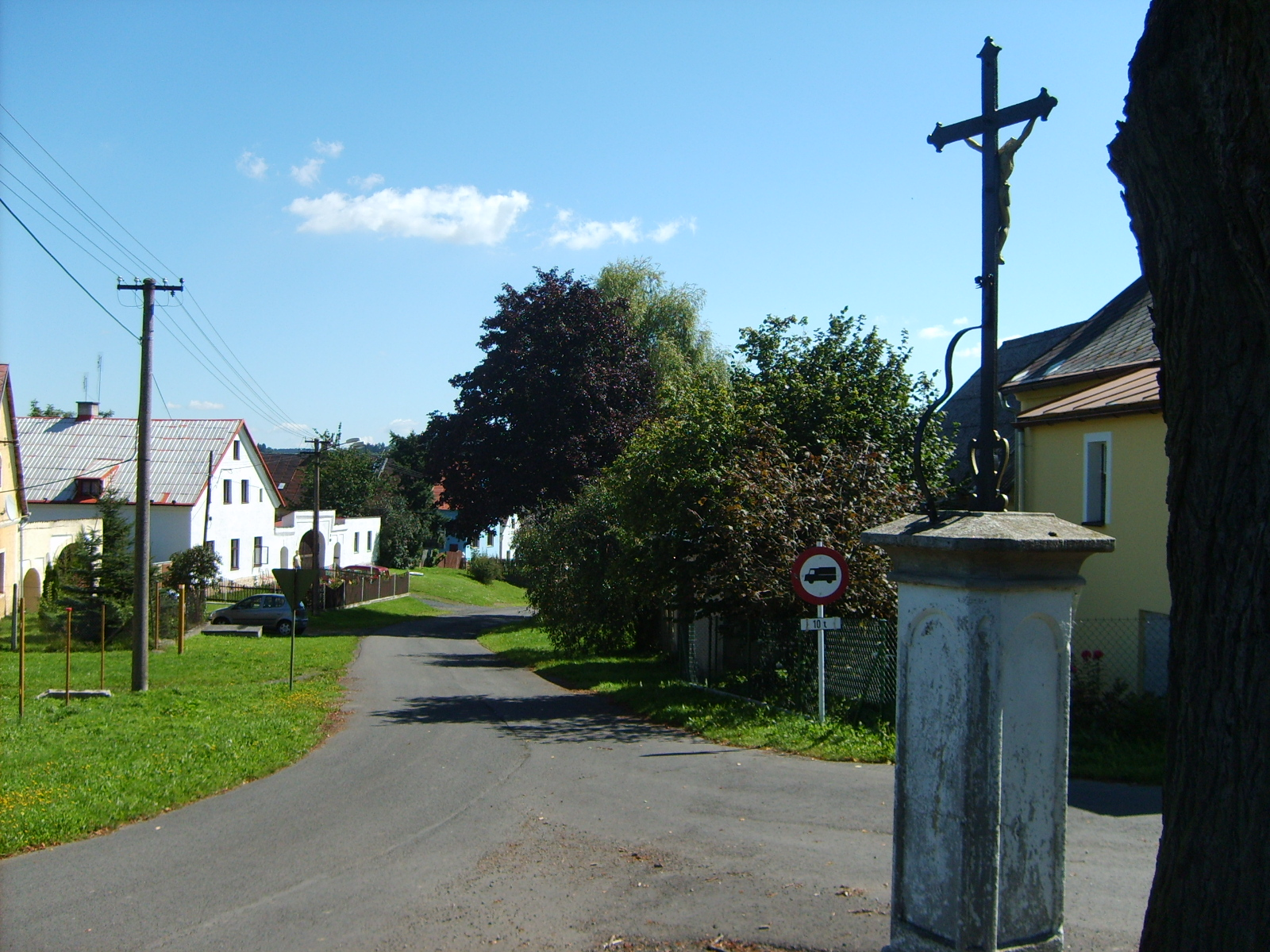
- Lower part of Vlkovice

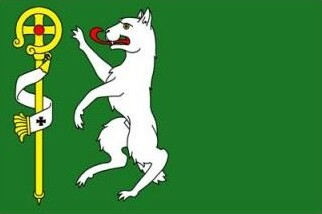
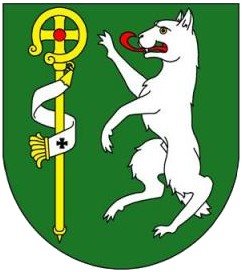
- Flag Coat of arms

- Location in the Czech Republic
- Coordinates: 49°56′56″N 12°44′21″E
- Country: Czech Republic
- Region: Karlovy Vary
- District: Cheb
- First mentioned: 1273

Area
  - Total: 4.93 km^{2} (1.90 sq mi)
- Elevation: 666 m (2,185 ft)

Population (2026-01-01)
  - Total: 120
  - Density: 24/km^{2} (63/sq mi)
- Time zone: UTC+1 (CET)
  - Summer (DST): UTC+2 (CEST)
- Postal code: 353 01
- Website: www.vlkovice.cz

Vlkovice (German: Wilkowitz) is a municipality and village in Cheb District in the Karlovy Vary Region of the Czech Republic. It has about 100 inhabitants.

== Administrative division ==
Vlkovice consists of two municipal parts (in brackets population according to the 2021 census):

- Vlkovice (104)
- Martinov (21)

== Demographics ==
Historical population
Year	Pop.	±%
1869	312	—
1880	336	+7.7%
1890	287	−14.6%
1900	307	+7.0%
1910	333	+8.5%
1921	312	−6.3%
1930	377	+20.8%
1950	166	−56.0%
1961	149	−10.2%
1970	125	−16.1%
1980	135	+8.0%
1991	130	−3.7%
2001	127	−2.3%
2011	124	−2.4%
2021	125	+0.8%
Source: Censuses
