= Ovesné Kladruby =

- Municipality
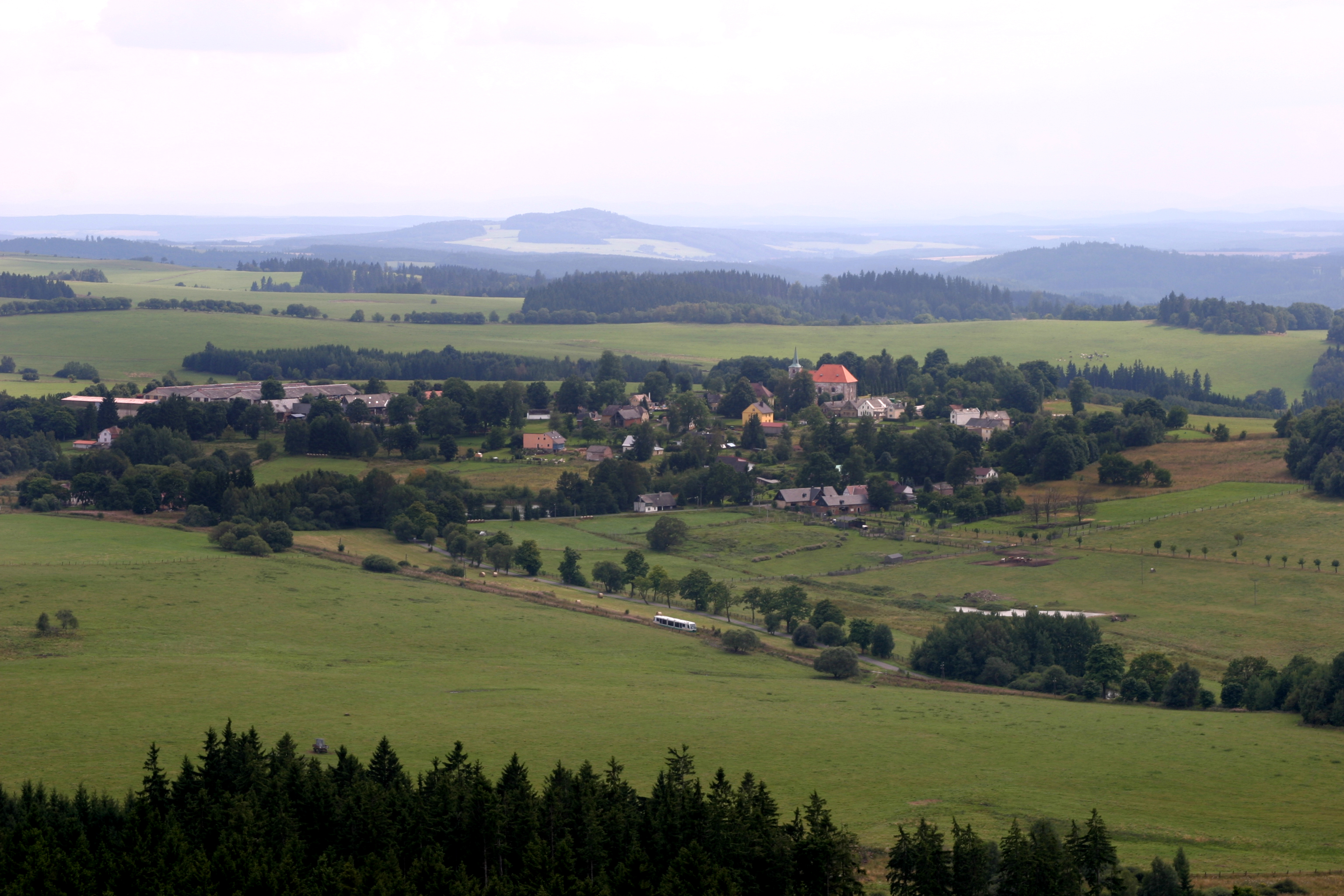
- General view

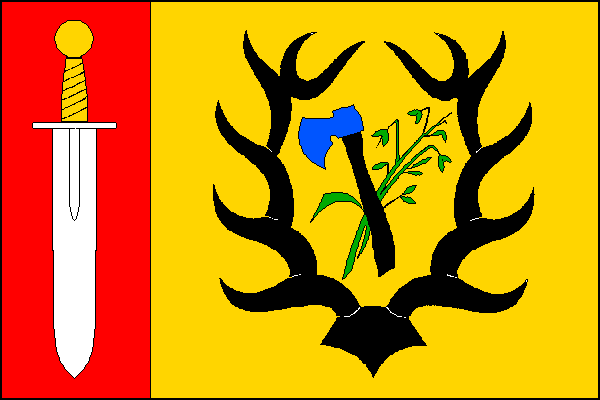
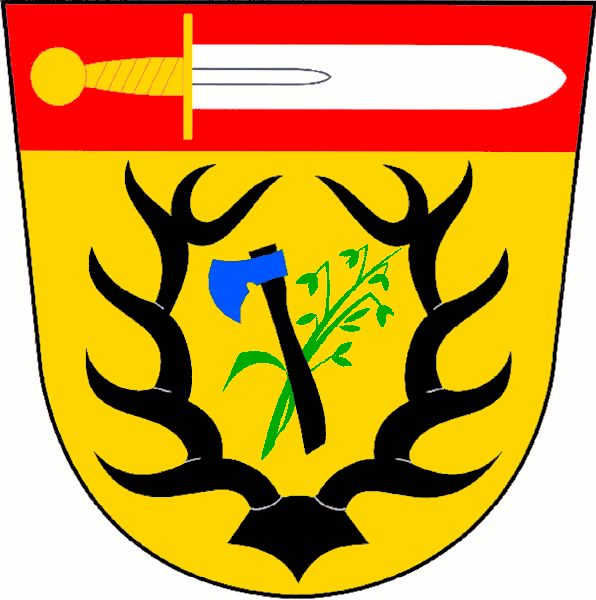
- Flag Coat of arms

- Location in the Czech Republic
- Coordinates: 49°57′11″N 12°46′45″E
- Country: Czech Republic
- Region: Karlovy Vary
- District: Cheb
- First mentioned: 1363

Area
  - Total: 18.05 km^{2} (6.97 sq mi)
- Elevation: 715 m (2,346 ft)

Population (2026-01-01)
  - Total: 149
  - Density: 8.25/km^{2} (21.4/sq mi)
- Time zone: UTC+1 (CET)
  - Summer (DST): UTC+2 (CEST)
- Postal code: 353 01
- Website: www.ovesnekladruby.cz

Ovesné Kladruby (German: Habakladrau) is a municipality and village in Cheb District in the Karlovy Vary Region of the Czech Republic. It has about 100 inhabitants.

== Demographics ==
Historical population
Year	Pop.	±%
1869	565	—
1880	602	+6.5%
1890	633	+5.1%
1900	677	+7.0%
1910	663	−2.1%
1921	643	−3.0%
1930	696	+8.2%
1950	205	−70.5%
1961	196	−4.4%
1970	184	−6.1%
1980	127	−31.0%
1991	104	−18.1%
2001	121	+16.3%
2011	111	−8.3%
2021	128	+15.3%
Source: Censuses
