= Mnichov (Cheb District) =

- Municipality
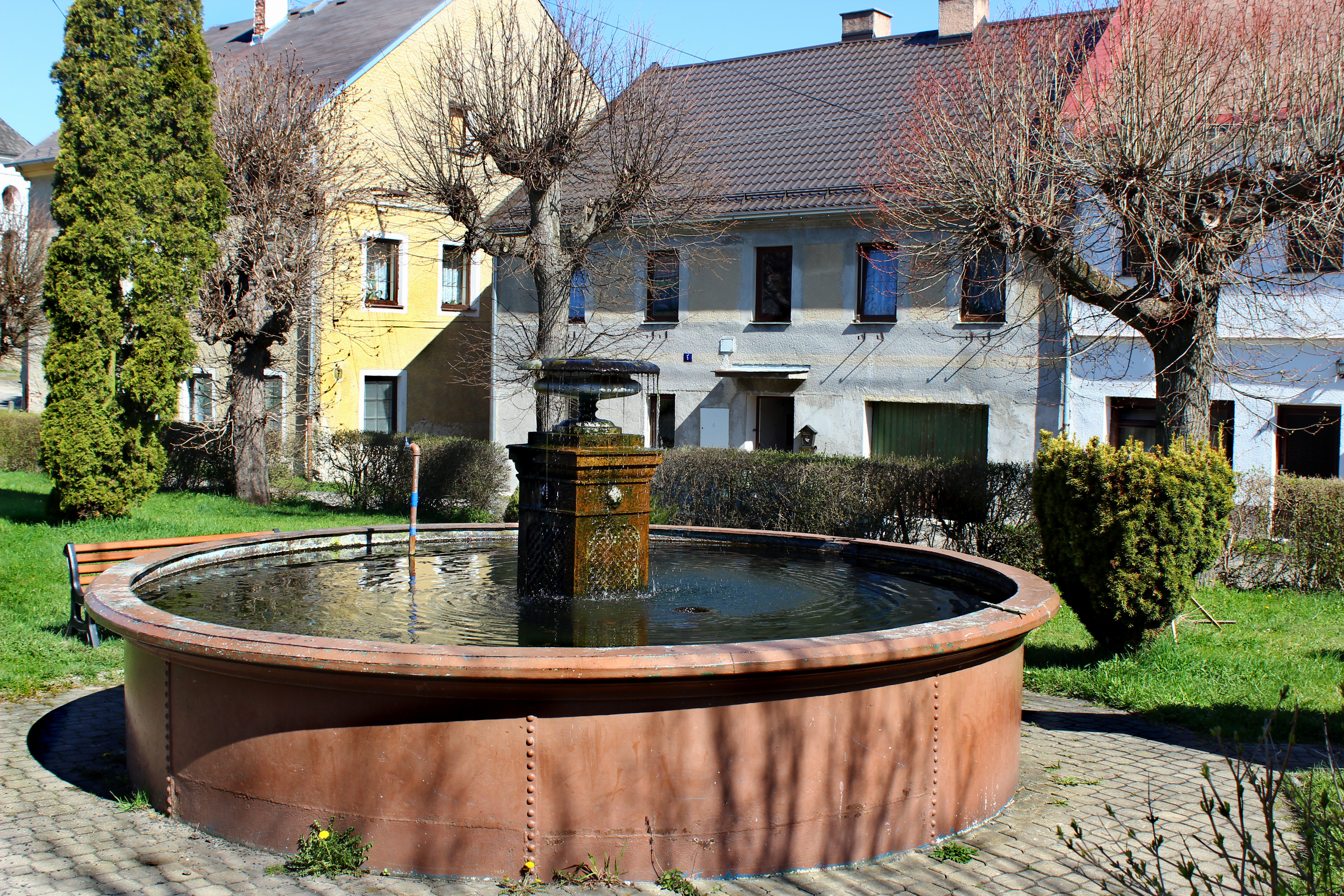
- Fountain on the square

- Flag Coat of arms

- Location in the Czech Republic
- Coordinates: 50°2′13″N 12°47′13″E
- Country: Czech Republic
- Region: Karlovy Vary
- District: Cheb
- First mentioned: 1273

Area
  - Total: 27.87 km^{2} (10.76 sq mi)
- Elevation: 725 m (2,379 ft)

Population (2026-01-01)
  - Total: 409
  - Density: 14.7/km^{2} (38.0/sq mi)
- Time zone: UTC+1 (CET)
  - Summer (DST): UTC+2 (CEST)
- Postal code: 354 83
- Website: www.ou-mnichov.cz

Mnichov (German: Einsiedl) is a municipality and village in Cheb District in the Karlovy Vary Region of the Czech Republic. It has about 400 inhabitants.

== Administrative division ==
Mnichov consists of three municipal parts (in brackets population according to the 2021 census):

- Mnichov (195)
- Rájov (98)
- Sítiny (66)

== Demographics ==
Historical population
Year	Pop.	±%
1869	2,263	—
1880	2,390	+5.6%
1890	2,407	+0.7%
1900	2,233	−7.2%
1910	2,166	−3.0%
1921	1,947	−10.1%
1930	1,874	−3.7%
1950	551	−70.6%
1961	409	−25.8%
1970	531	+29.8%
1980	463	−12.8%
1991	430	−7.1%
2001	339	−21.2%
2011	357	+5.3%
2021	359	+0.6%
Source: Censuses
