= Aš (administrative district) =

Administrative district in the Czech Republic

Administrative district of the municipality with extended powers of Aš Správní obvod obce s rozšířenou působností Aš
- Administrative district of municipality with extended powers
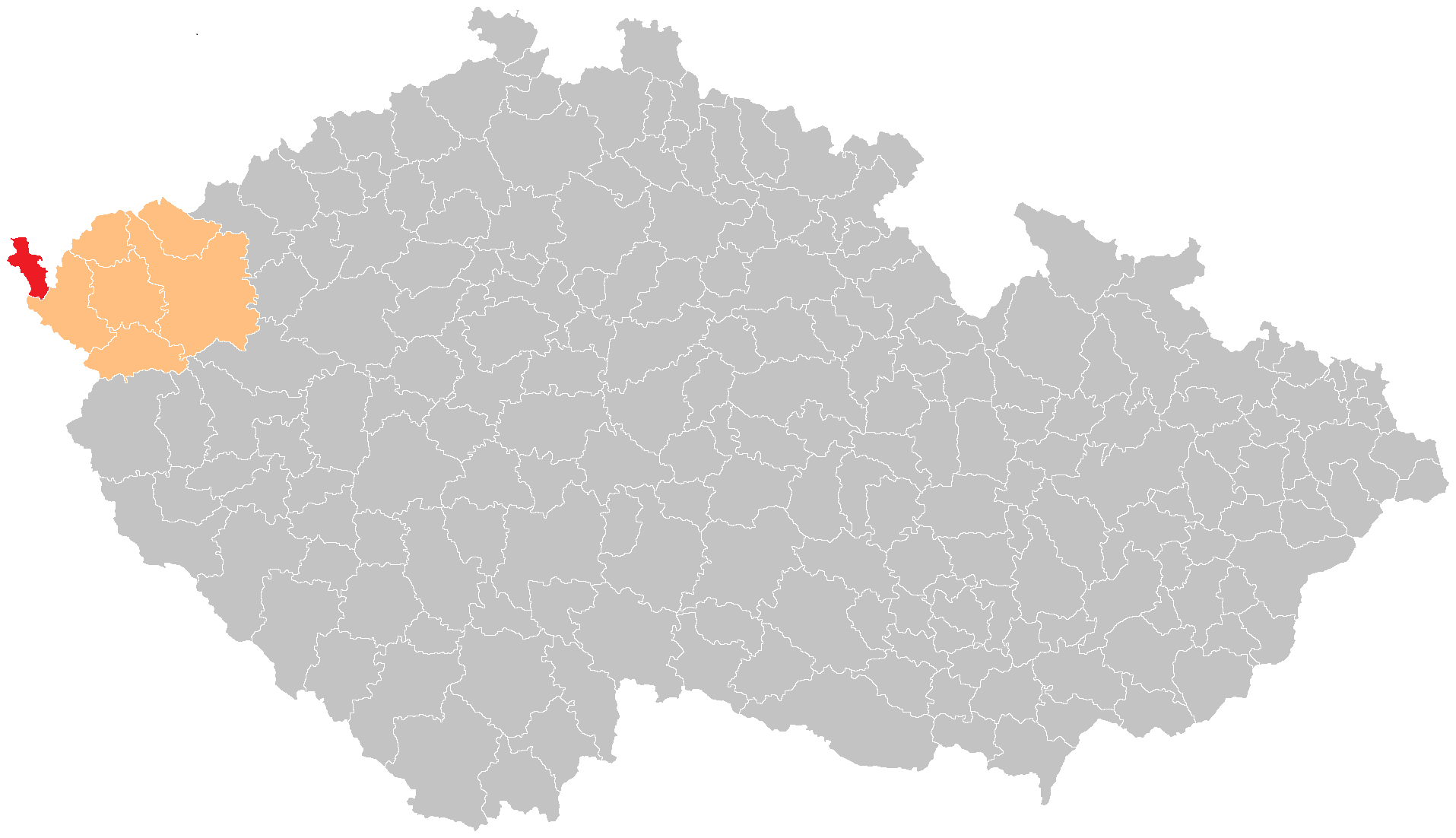
- Location in the Karlovy Vary Region within the Czech Republic
- Coordinates: 50°14′N 12°13′E
- Country: Czech Republic
- Region: Karlovy Vary
- District: Cheb
- Municipality with extended powers: Aš

Area
  - Total: 143.75 km^{2} (55.50 sq mi)

Population (2024)
  - Total: 17,255
  - Density: 120.03/km^{2} (310.89/sq mi)
- Time zone: UTC+1 (CET)
  - Summer (DST): UTC+2 (CEST)
- Municipalities: 5
- * Cities and towns: 2
- * Market towns: 0

The administrative district of the municipality with extended powers of Aš (abbreviated AD MEP Aš; Czech: Správní obvod obce s rozšířenou působností Aš, SO ORP Aš) is an administrative district of municipality with extended powers in Cheb District in the Karlovy Vary Region of the Czech Republic. It has existed since 1 January 2003, when the districts were replaced administratively. It includes 5 municipalities which have a combined population of about 17,000.

== Municipalities ==
Cities and towns are in bold.

Municipality	Population	Area (km^{2)}	Density
**Aš**	12,783	55.86	228
Hazlov	1,530	27.88	55
**Hranice**	2,101	31.79	66
Krásná	625	21.85	29
Podhradí	216	6.36	34

== Demographics ==
Historical population

Year	Pop.	±%
1869	28,091	—
1880	32,460	+15.6%
1890	34,502	+6.3%
1900	39,387	+14.2%
1910	45,084	+14.5%

Year	Pop.	±%
1921	39,437	−12.5%
1930	45,166	+14.5%
1950	18,248	−59.6%
1961	16,147	−11.5%
1970	17,558	+8.7%

Year	Pop.	±%
1980	17,368	−1.1%
1991	16,502	−5.0%
2001	17,041	+3.3%
2011	16,994	−0.3%
2021	16,508	−2.9%

Source: Censuses
