= Trstěnice (Cheb District) =

- Municipality
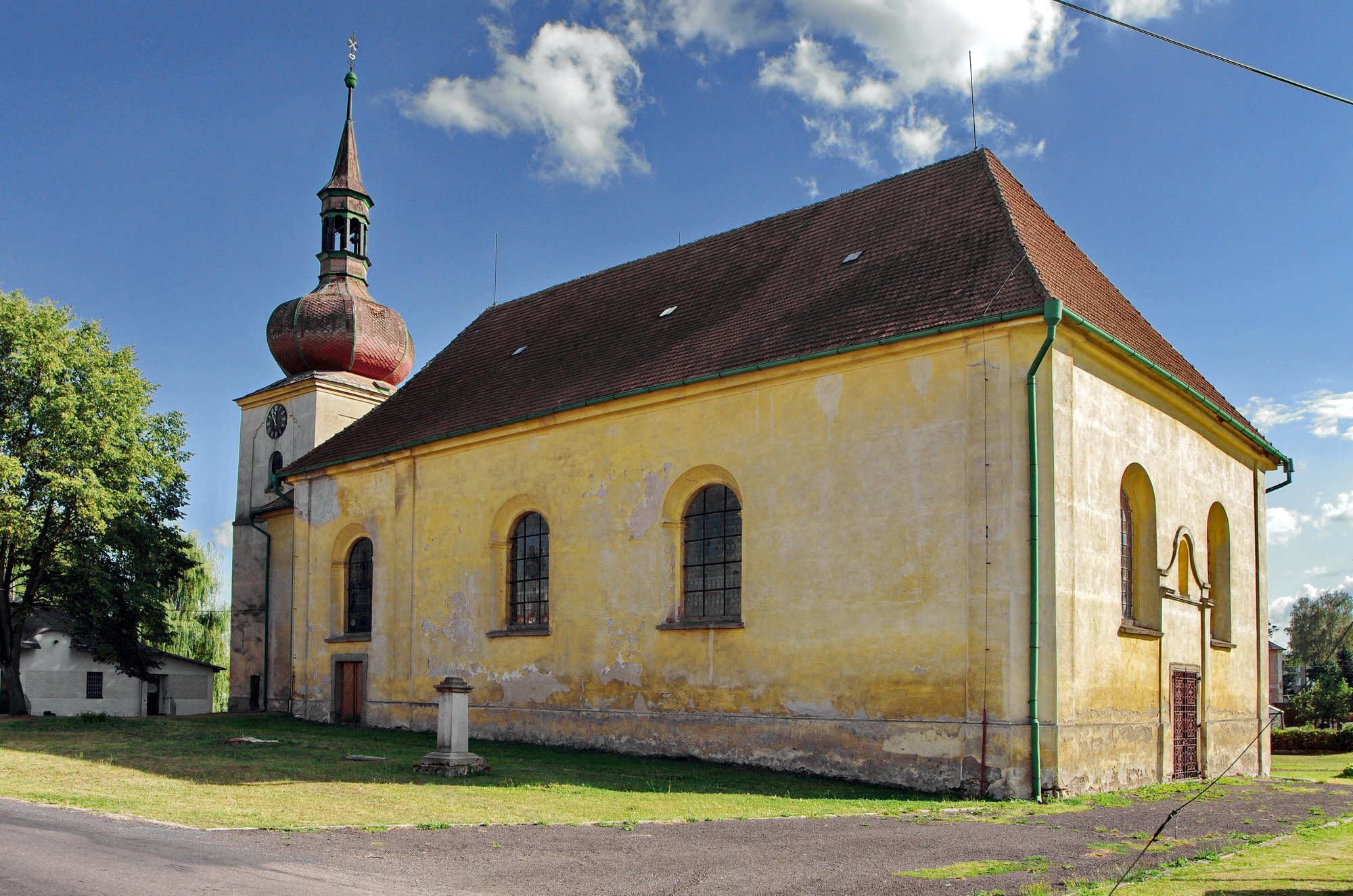
- Church of Saint Vitus

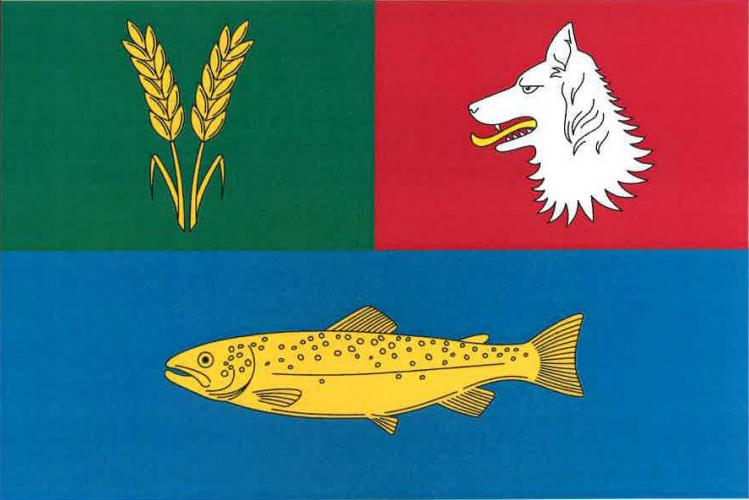
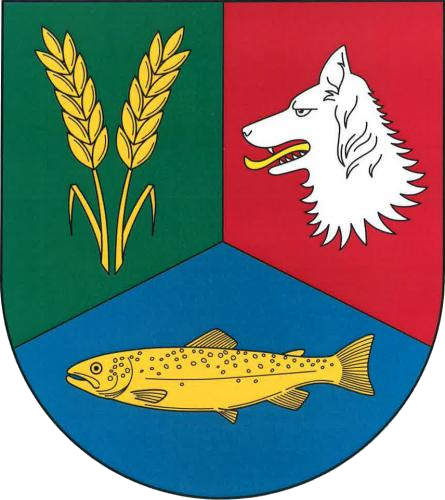
- Flag Coat of arms

- Location in the Czech Republic
- Coordinates: 49°55′9″N 12°40′34″E
- Country: Czech Republic
- Region: Karlovy Vary
- District: Cheb
- First mentioned: 1367

Area
  - Total: 15.50 km^{2} (5.98 sq mi)
- Elevation: 558 m (1,831 ft)

Population (2026-01-01)
  - Total: 407
  - Density: 26.3/km^{2} (68.0/sq mi)
- Time zone: UTC+1 (CET)
  - Summer (DST): UTC+2 (CEST)
- Postal code: 353 01
- Website: www.obectrstenice.cz

Trstěnice (German: Neudorf bei Plan) is a municipality and village in Cheb District in the Karlovy Vary Region of the Czech Republic. It has about 400 inhabitants.

== Administrative division ==
Trstěnice consists of two municipal parts (in brackets population according to the 2021 census):

- Trstěnice (295)
- Horní Ves (73)

== Demographics ==
Historical population
Year	Pop.	±%
1869	891	—
1880	924	+3.7%
1890	918	−0.6%
1900	912	−0.7%
1910	918	+0.7%
1921	901	−1.9%
1930	892	−1.0%
1950	370	−58.5%
1961	320	−13.5%
1970	345	+7.8%
1980	351	+1.7%
1991	368	+4.8%
2001	349	−5.2%
2011	361	+3.4%
2021	368	+1.9%
Source: Censuses
