= Drmoul =

- Municipality
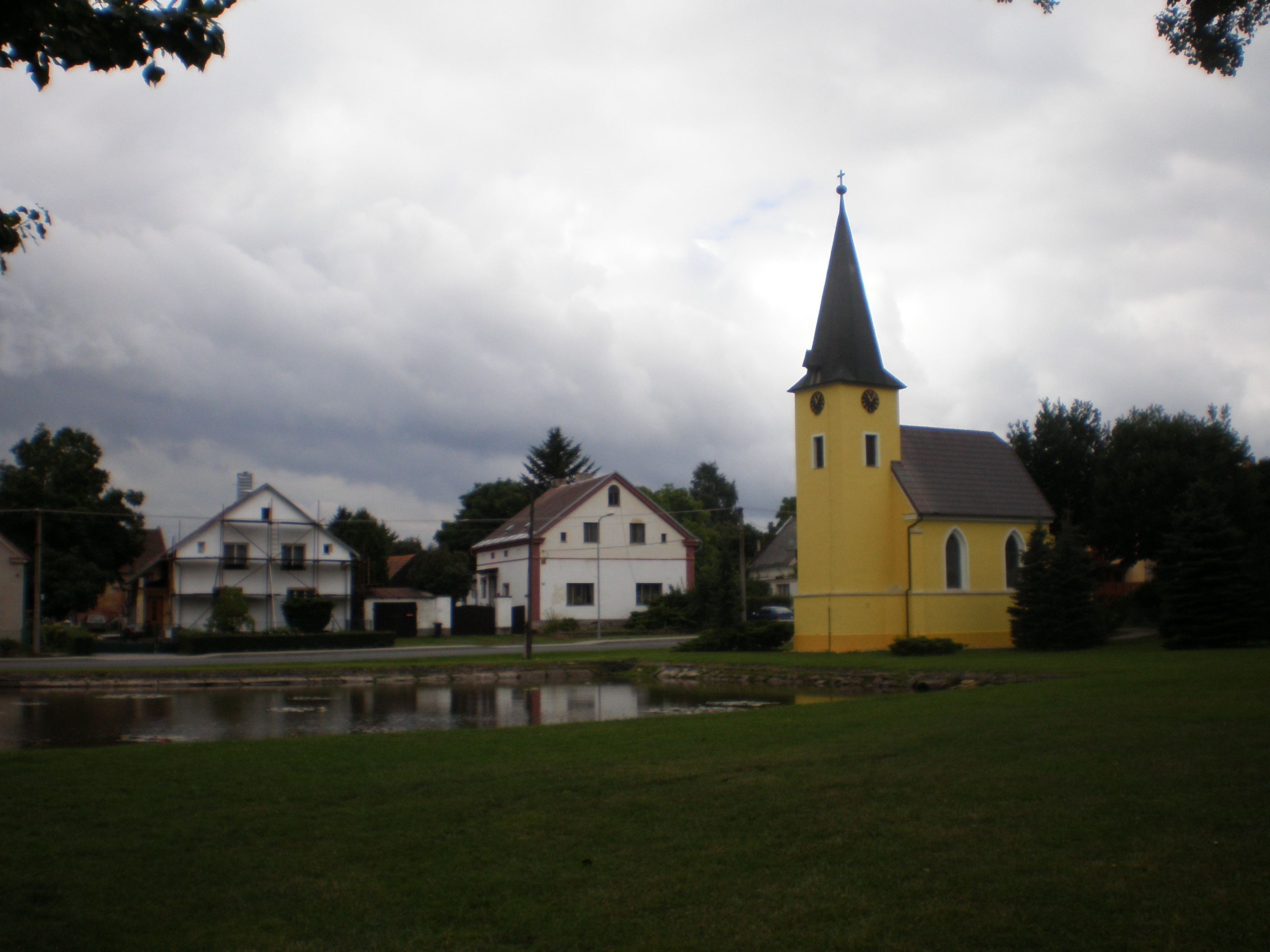
- Centre of the village

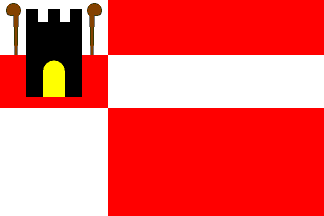
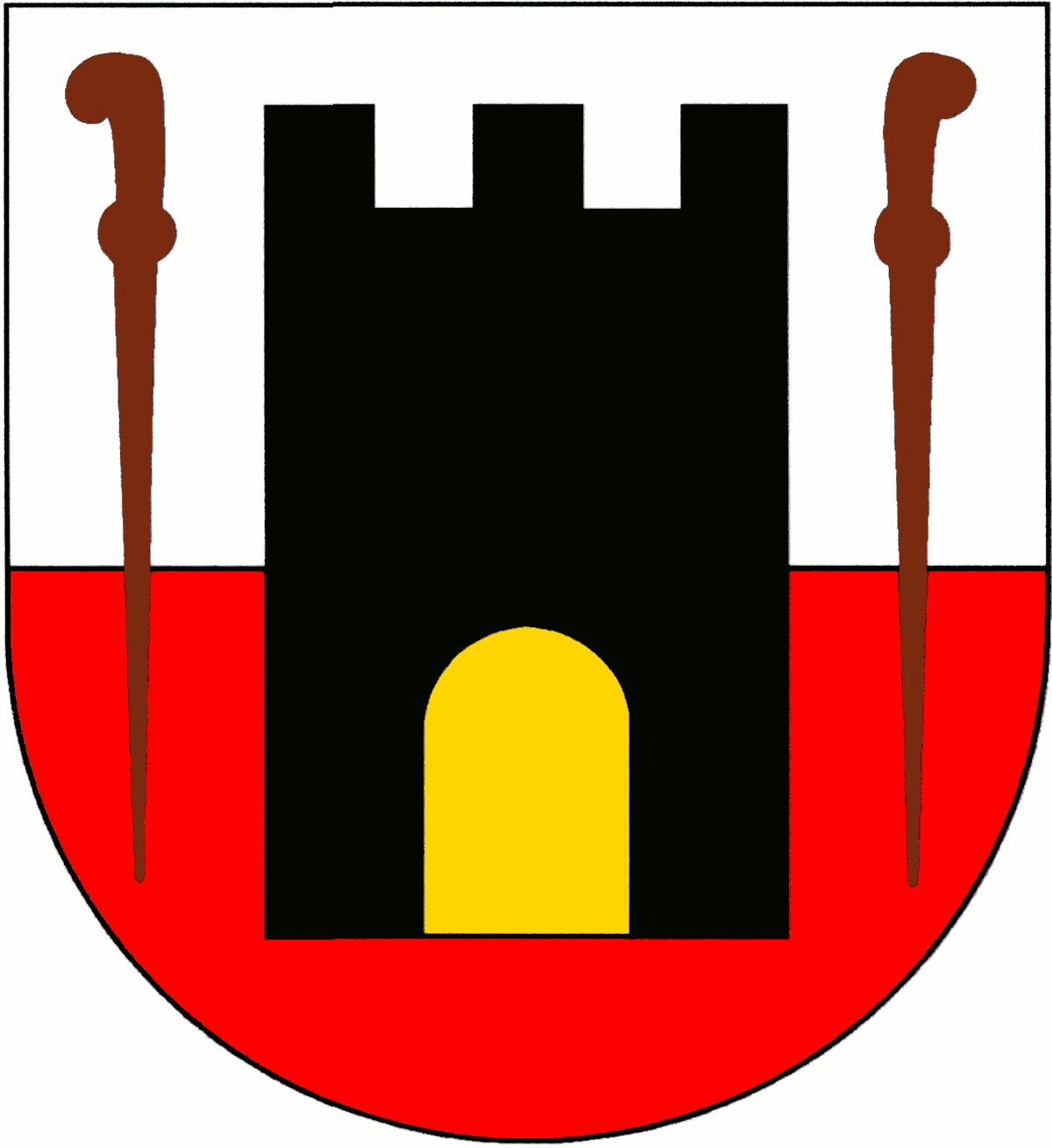
- Flag Coat of arms

- Location in the Czech Republic
- Coordinates: 49°56′21″N 12°39′56″E
- Country: Czech Republic
- Region: Karlovy Vary
- District: Cheb
- First mentioned: 1368

Area
  - Total: 6.37 km^{2} (2.46 sq mi)
- Elevation: 562 m (1,844 ft)

Population (2026-01-01)
  - Total: 1,046
  - Density: 164/km^{2} (425/sq mi)
- Time zone: UTC+1 (CET)
  - Summer (DST): UTC+2 (CEST)
- Postal code: 354 72
- Website: www.obecdrmoul.cz

Drmoul (German: Dürrmaul) is a municipality and village in Cheb District in the Karlovy Vary Region of the Czech Republic. It has about 1,000 inhabitants.

== Demographics ==
Historical population
Year	Pop.	±%
1869	803	—
1880	916	+14.1%
1890	963	+5.1%
1900	1,038	+7.8%
1910	1,240	+19.5%
1921	1,126	−9.2%
1930	1,349	+19.8%
1950	680	−49.6%
1961	773	+13.7%
1970	739	−4.4%
1980	734	−0.7%
1991	720	−1.9%
2001	751	+4.3%
2011	923	+22.9%
2021	987	+6.9%
Source: Censuses
