= Leonard Rotter =

Czech painter, sculptor and artist (1895–1963)

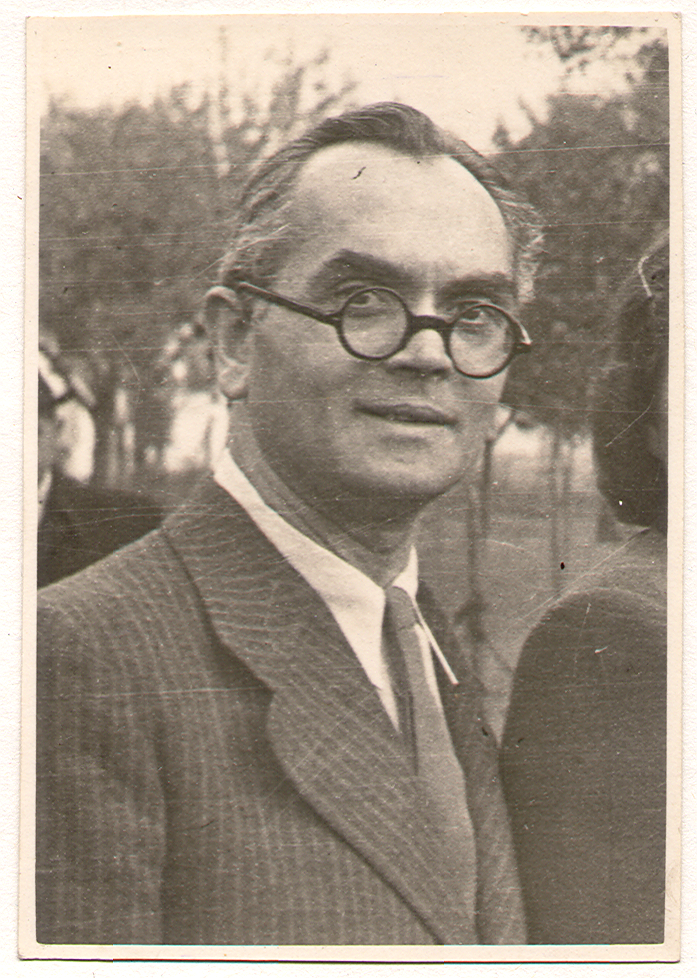
Leonard Rotter

Leonard Rotter (September 14, 1895, Vienna-Floridsdorf - July 14, 1963, Prague) was a Czech sculptor, woodcarver, and watercolour painter.

He is distinct from the landscape painter who signed as L. B. Rotter from Uherské Hradiště, whose oil paintings are often presented in auctions under the identity of Leonard Rotter.

== Biography ==
=== Early life ===
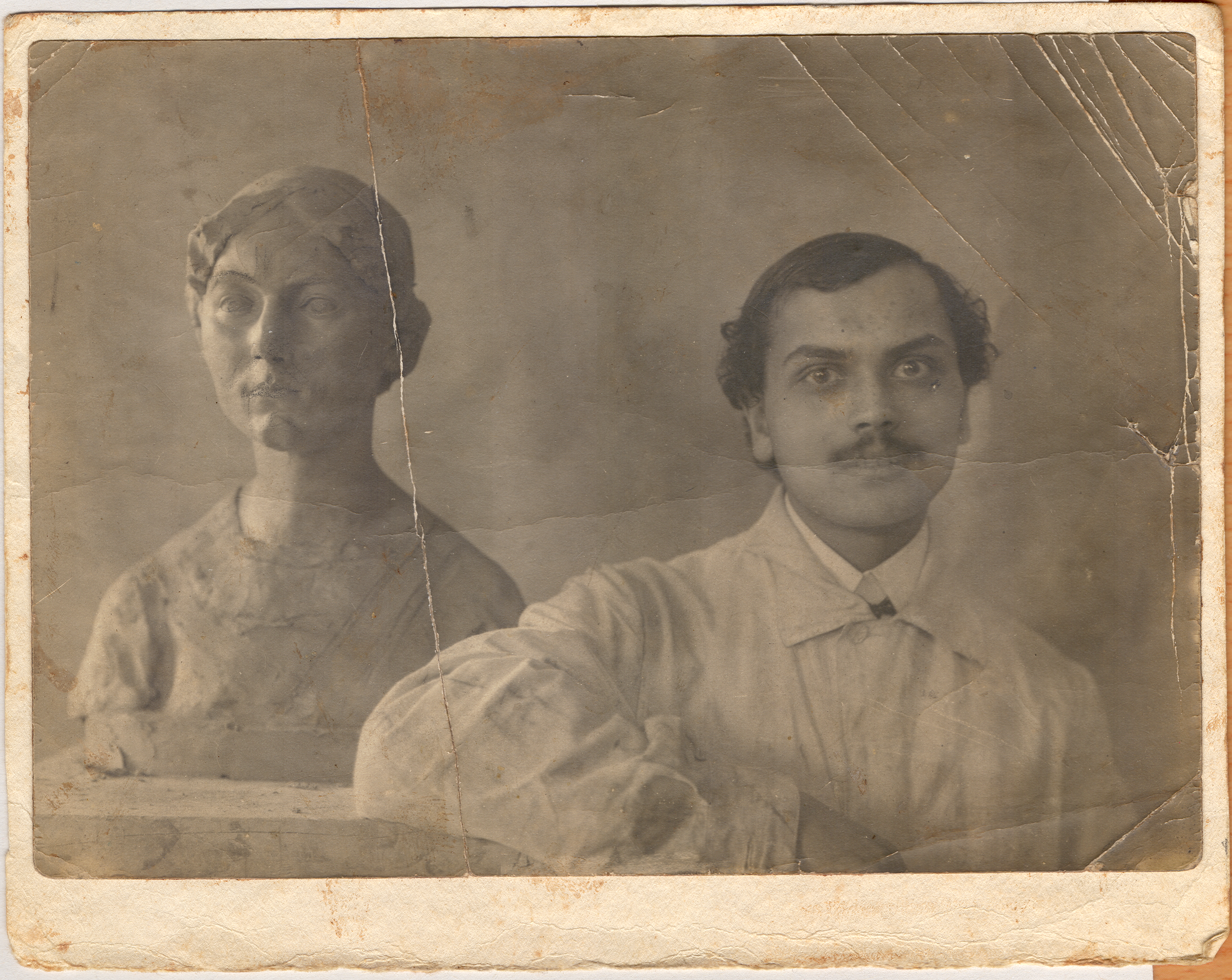
Young sculptor Leonard Rotter, standing next to his absolvent work, a portrait of a woman.

Leonard (Leonhard) Rotter was born on September 14, 1895, in Floridsdorf (Austria), which later became a part of Vienna, to Leonhard and Albine Rotter. In 1900, the family moved to Prague (Czech Republic). He was trained as a woodcarver by František Liška (1909—1912) and later studied at the State Technical School in Prague under professors Jan Maudr and Alois Bouda. Between 1914 and 1917 he studied sculpture at the School of Applied Arts in Prague under the guidance of professors Ludvík Wurzel, Štěpán Zálešák, and Josef Drahoňovský, where he focused on portraits and busts.

=== From World War I to World War II ===
During the First World War, Leonard Rotter was seriously injured as a soldier resulting in severe nerve damage. After the end of the war he returned to Prague to continue in sculpture art. He started to work independently, initially in a provisional studio situated in a laundry and later in his own studio in Hradčany in Na Valech.

In 1926 the sculptor settled with his family in Žižkov and moved his studio first to Dlouhá Street; later moving to the Old Town to the Kinský Palace. However, he had to vacate after the Nazi occupation of Czechoslovakia in 1939. He acquired a new space in the Tyrš House in Malá Strana, where he worked until his death in 1963.

The artist married Julia Tolde and the couple raised an only child, daughter Romana Rotterová, born in 1931.

In 1945, during the bombing of Prague, an air strike hit the studio of Leonard Rotter and destroyed almost all of his work.

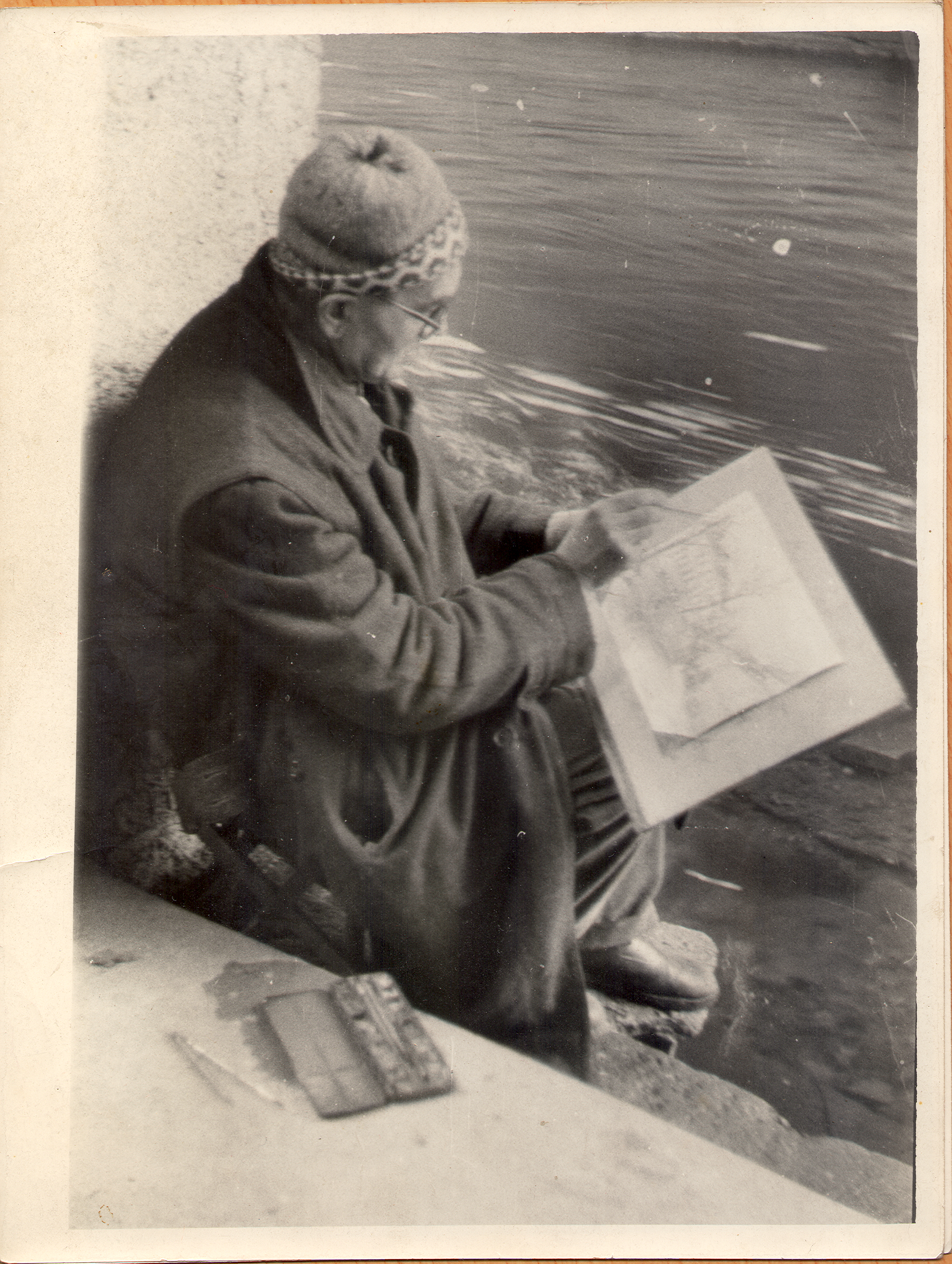
Leonard Rotter painting watercolour of Prague in winter.

=== Death ===
The sculptor interrupted his artistic activity only briefly due to health problems in the early 1960s, when his left hand had temporarily been paralyzed after a stroke.

He died suddenly of a heart attack in the middle of the process of his work on July 14, 1963, in a small apartment in Malá Strana.

== Work ==
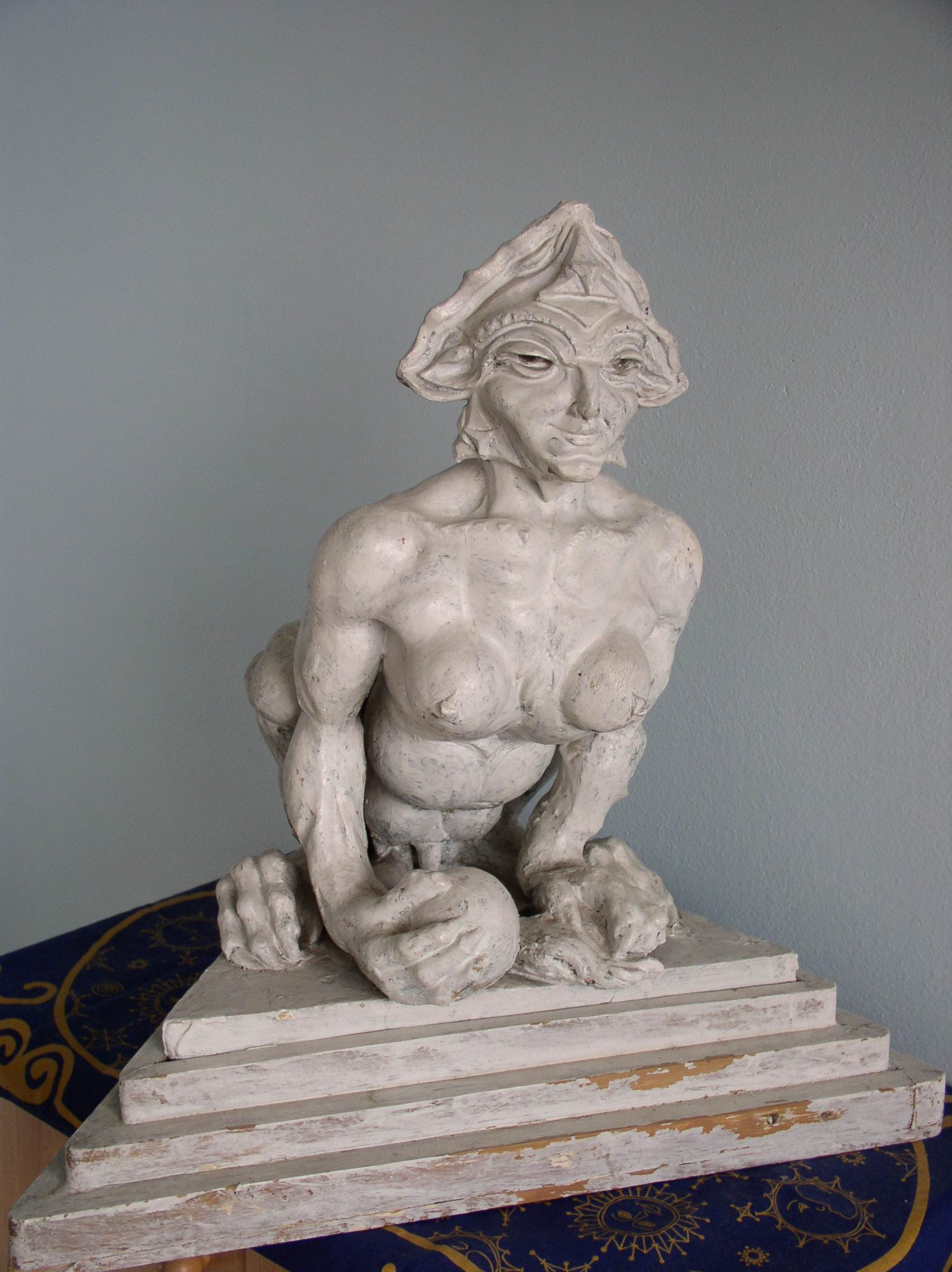
Sculpture by Leonard Rotter

=== Plastic art ===
The early work of Leonard Rotter included sculpture portraits and busts of some of the leading Czech figures of the 19th and 20th centuries, such as professor of conservatory and harpist Václav Klička [cs] or the painter Láďa Novák [cs], published in the magazines Zlatá Praha 1924/1925 and 1925/1926, respectively, as well as a portrait of the prominent Czech Egyptologist Professor František Lexa. He also created portraits of historical figures, such as the 17th century's Czech revolutionary leader Jan Sladký Kozina, and many others.

Since the beginning of his artistic career, free creation has remained the core of his work - he created a number of smaller sculptures with philosophical themes such as Eternal Question, Life and Love, Desire, Twilight, and others. He also cooperated with a Czech lodge of Freemasons and created for them several works with the symbolism of order.

His red marble (slivenec) statue of the Czech poet Karel Hynek Mácha, based on several designs created for the Society for the Restoration of Karel Hynek Mácha's Memorial, was elevated and ceremonially unveiled in 1936 at the north coast of the Mácha Lake in Staré Splavy near Doksy, on the top of Jarmilina skála, the rock where Jarmila, one of the main figures in the poet's most famous work - Máj, jumped into the lake and ended her life. In 1939, however, the statue was torn down by Sudeten German Party (Sudetendeutsche Heimatfront of Konrad Henlein) during the fascist occupation of the area. Later, it was requested by Bělá pod Bezdězem and relocated further from the lake on top of Hůrka, where it remains until today, although the locality does not have the original context to the Society's intent. The original design is now stored in the Museum in Česká Lípa.

In 1937, his 2.5 meter-high clay sculpture of a blacksmith was installed on the front of the house of a famous Czech engineer, Emil Kolben, at his residence in Břevnov at the street Na Vypichu (today's Bělohorská No. 1202) . The statue was destroyed during the reconstruction of the house in 1979.

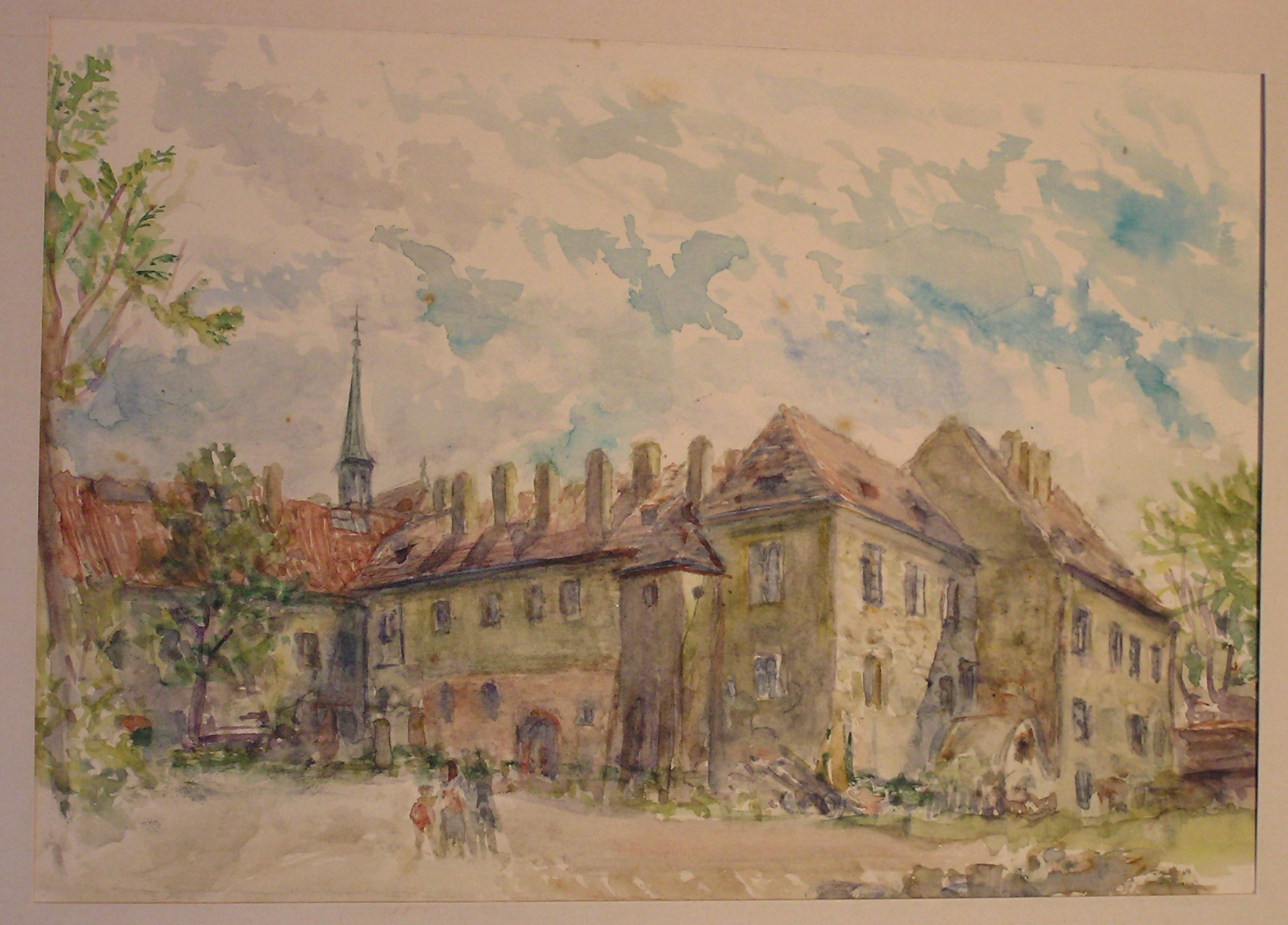
Convent of Saint Agnes by Leonard Rotter, 1959, watercolour

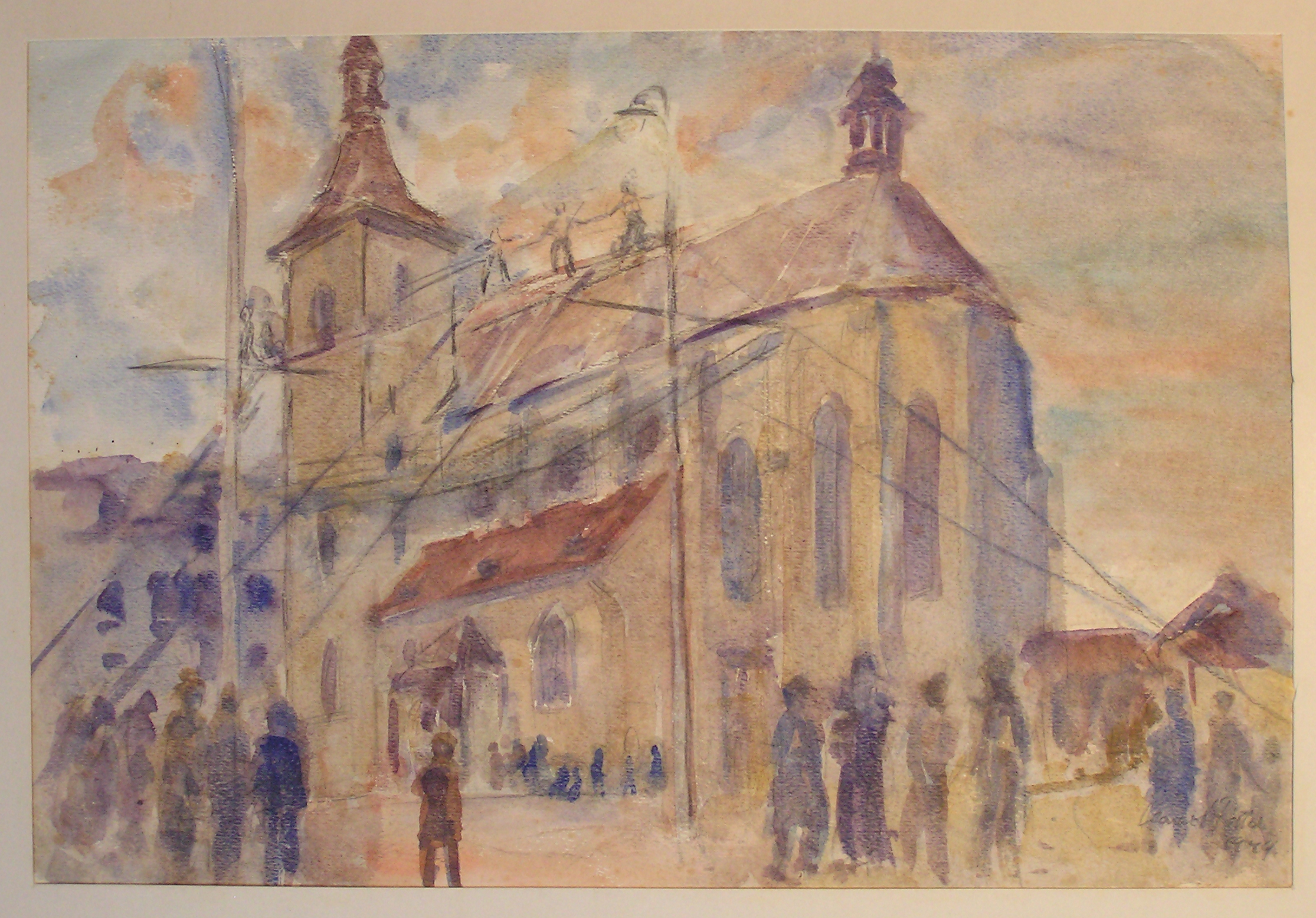
Funambulists at Saint Castulus Church in Prague, by Leonard Rotter, 1949, watercolour

=== Fine art and watercolours ===
In the late thirties (1930s), Leonard Rotter embraced the technique of watercolour, as the demand of plastic art generally declined due to the difficult war times. His watercolour paintings mostly depicted various alleys and monuments of Prague. He dedicated many years to create paintings of the Convent of St. Agnes.

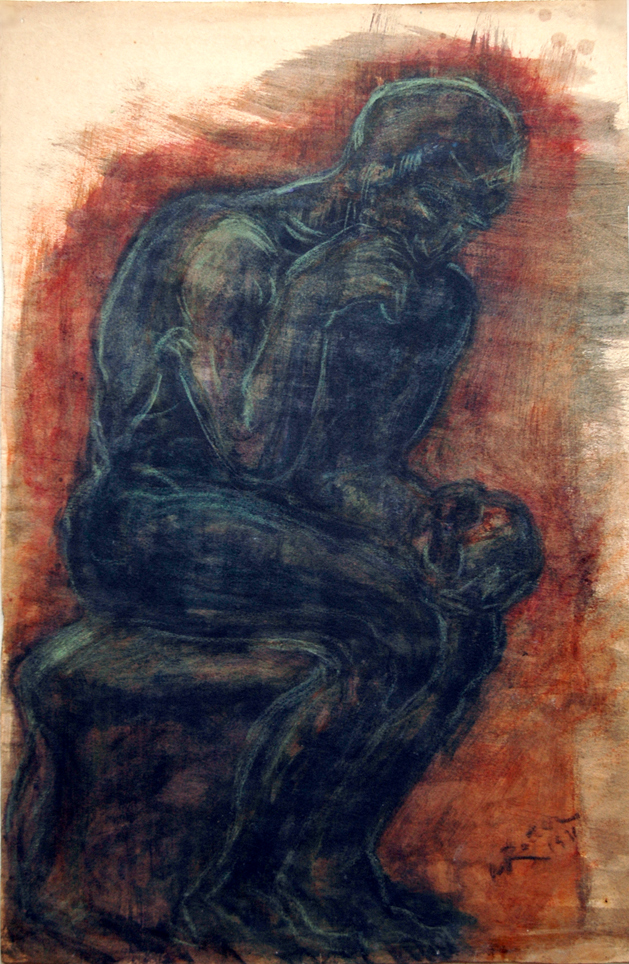
Hamlet, 1938

== Legacy ==
František Dvořák, Czech art historian, about Leonard Rotter at the exhibition of his watercolour paintings of Malá Strana and Hradčany districts, in 1957 at Malostranská beseda:

"… He knows both districts with his heart, not just with his eyes, he can depict them internally, not just with his technique, he knows his topics for several decades and he likes them".

== Exhibitions ==
=== Collective exhibitions ===
- First comprehensive exhibition of sculptures of Leonard Rotter was held in 1936 at the Clam-Gallas Palace together with painter Oskar Rex.

=== Individual exhibitions ===
- 1940, Beaufort in Jungmannova Street, Prague.
- 1940, Sculpture studio in Hellichova Street in Malá Strana, Prague.
- In 1957, an exhibition titled Malá Strana and Hradčany in the work of Leonard Rotter took place in Malostranská beseda, where the author first exhibited his watercolors, which had been created since the late 1930s.
- In December 1963, collective exhibition of work of Leonard Rotter was held in Prague at the Institute of Biology of the Czechoslovak Academy of Sciences. Opening word was taken by František Dvořák, followed by complementing chamber music presented in live act by trio with František Xaver Thuri. At this exhibition, the bronze patinated sculpture Globus, representing symbols of scientific disciplines and the sun, which reinforces the harmonious vision of humanity endowed with love and wisdom for the future, was presented for the first time.
- 2005, cultural centre in Dobříš (a synagogue in the past).
- In 2011, an exhibition of Leonard Rotter's aquarelles depicting Prague Kampa quarter was held in Komunitní centrum Kampa
- 2015, Gallery of Česká Lípa, Memorial of K. H. Mácha, Doksy
- 2016, Horácká galerie, Nové Město na Moravě.

== Selection of works ==
Desire, 1940s

Eternal question, 1940s

Life and Love, 1930s

Twilight, 1930s

Globus

K. H. Mácha, 1936

Blacksmith, 1937

Emil Zátopek

Convent of St. Agnes, 1959

Prague Venice, 1959

Funambulists at St. Castulus, 1949
