= Saint Castulus Church, Prague =

Church in Prague

Coordinates: 50°5′28.6″N 14°25′27″E

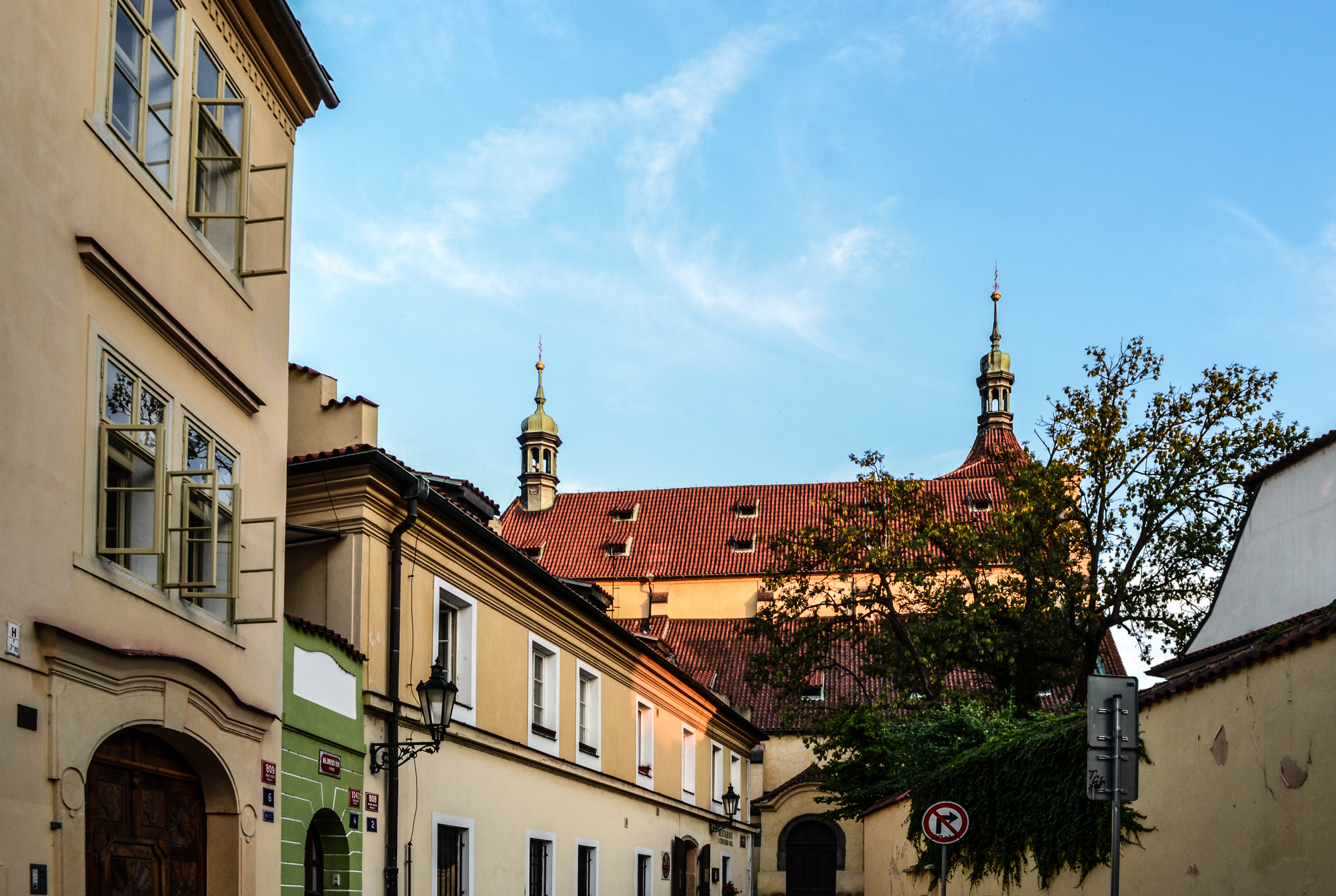
Church of Saint Castulus, Prague

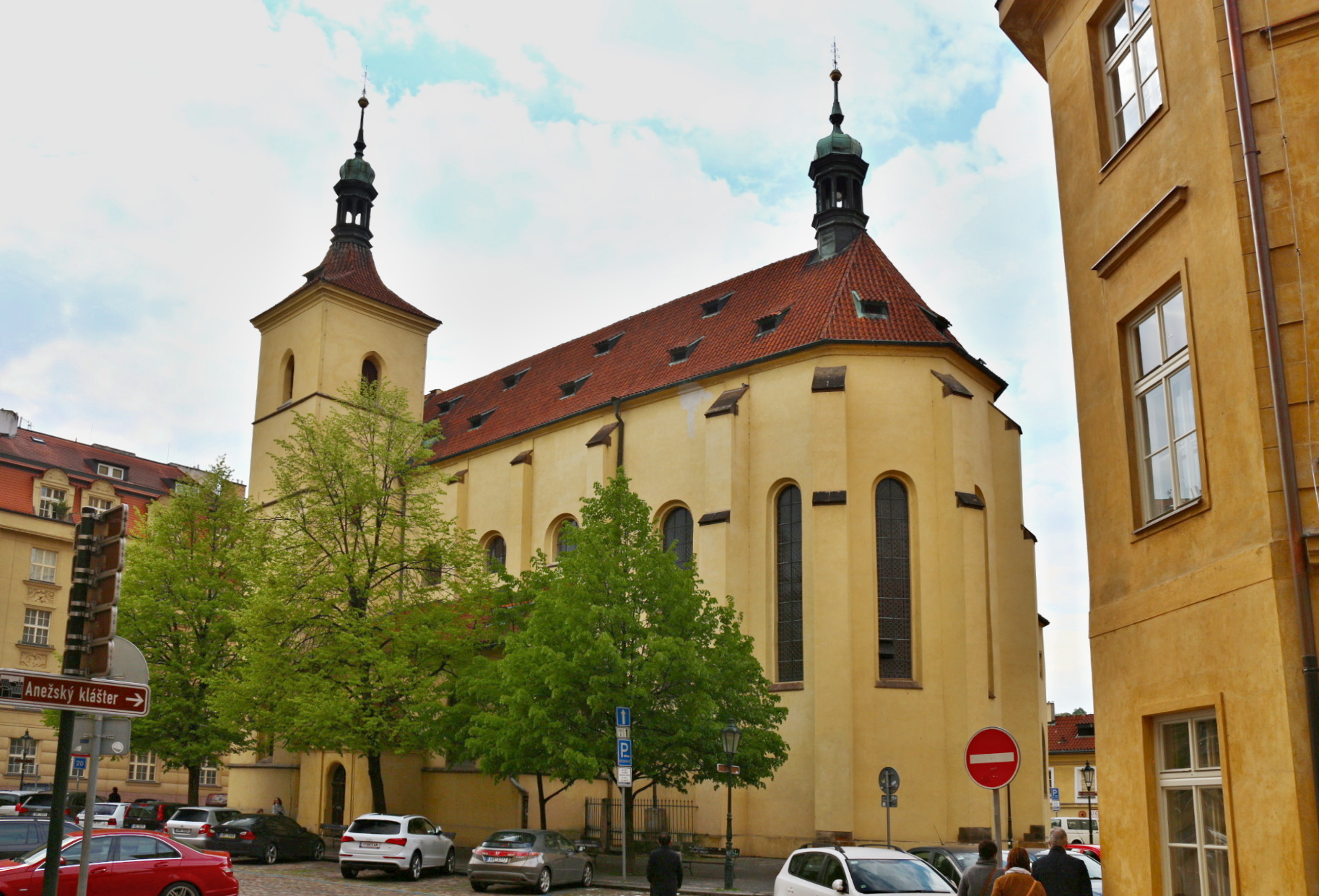
Southeastern view

St. Castulus church (Czech: Kostel svatého Haštala) is a Gothic church with Romanesque and Baroque elements. It is located on the Castulus square, in Old town near Convent of Saint Agnes. It is the only church in the Czech Republic consecrated to Saint Castulus.

== History ==
The church was built between 1375 and 1399, at the same location as the Romanesque church. This was one of the main Romanesque churches in Prague, that was documented in 1234. It was built by the road leading from the ford near St. Valentine, around the jew settlement, to “na Poříčí”. The further documentation was preserved in the end of the 14th and the beginning of the 15th century from renovation of altars of St. Catherine, St. Virgin Mary, St. Margaret and altar of God’s body. In the 14th century, there was also a cemetery and parsonage in vicinity of the church. The most significant stage of construction in the 14th century can be reconstructed based on reports, structural and architectural analysis.

Construction of the Gothic church started on the western and the eastern side of the Romanesque church approximately during the 14th century. The first part that was built was the polygon-shaped choir, part of the main nave and the southern nave. After a break when the construction of the northern nave should have begun, the initial project was changed, and it was decided to go with double-nave hall, instead of simple side nave, following style of architecture during the reign of king Wenceslaus IV. This stage was partially finished in 1375 when there is documented the establishment of the chapel of All Saints, place of today’s sacristy. The stonemasonry of Peter Parler also participated during construction, which is proven by finest stonework especially complex corbels on the perimeter walls of the side nave.

When the rest of the Romanesque church was demolished, the western part of the main nave with the front wall was finished, which interconnected the western part of the double nave. Meanwhile, at the east side of the church in front of the double-nave, the sacristy was built as an additional part of choir. The change of plans was discovered mainly because of style change of the double nave, and also because of the situation above the vault under the ceiling. New solution for the building was convergence of supporting arcade pillars, which created characteristic T-shape. This resulted in wall pressure relief above arcades between naves which holds the weight of the vault.

Church and also parsonage were damaged during Hussite wars, in 1432 the church was flooded and in 1436 the altars were consecrated again. Then the parish was under control of utraquists until 1624. Between 1500 and 1604 the tower was reconstructed. In 1620 a new cemetery was established in the parish garden and a new Lutheran school was built. From 1624 the church was administered by the Catholics and then, until 1739 by parish of Church of Our Lady before Týn.

In 1689 the church burnt down. The vault of the main ship fell, the tower was burnt and the bells were destroyed. After these accidents church was partially rebuilt to Baroque style by P.I. Bayer. These changes were made especially in main nave and choir where original vault was replaced by barrel vault. The reconstruction was finished in 1695, and the tower was rebuilt in 1714. After 1851, the whole church was repaired - the interior was flushed, and the altars and the pulpit were repaired. In 1885 the interior of the double-nave and its porch were repaired.

== Description ==
The church is mainly a stone building, the northern side of presbytery was made from bricks and part from the northern side of the main nave was made of blocks. The length of the church is 33 m, the width of double nave is 8 meters and the width of side nave is 9 meters.

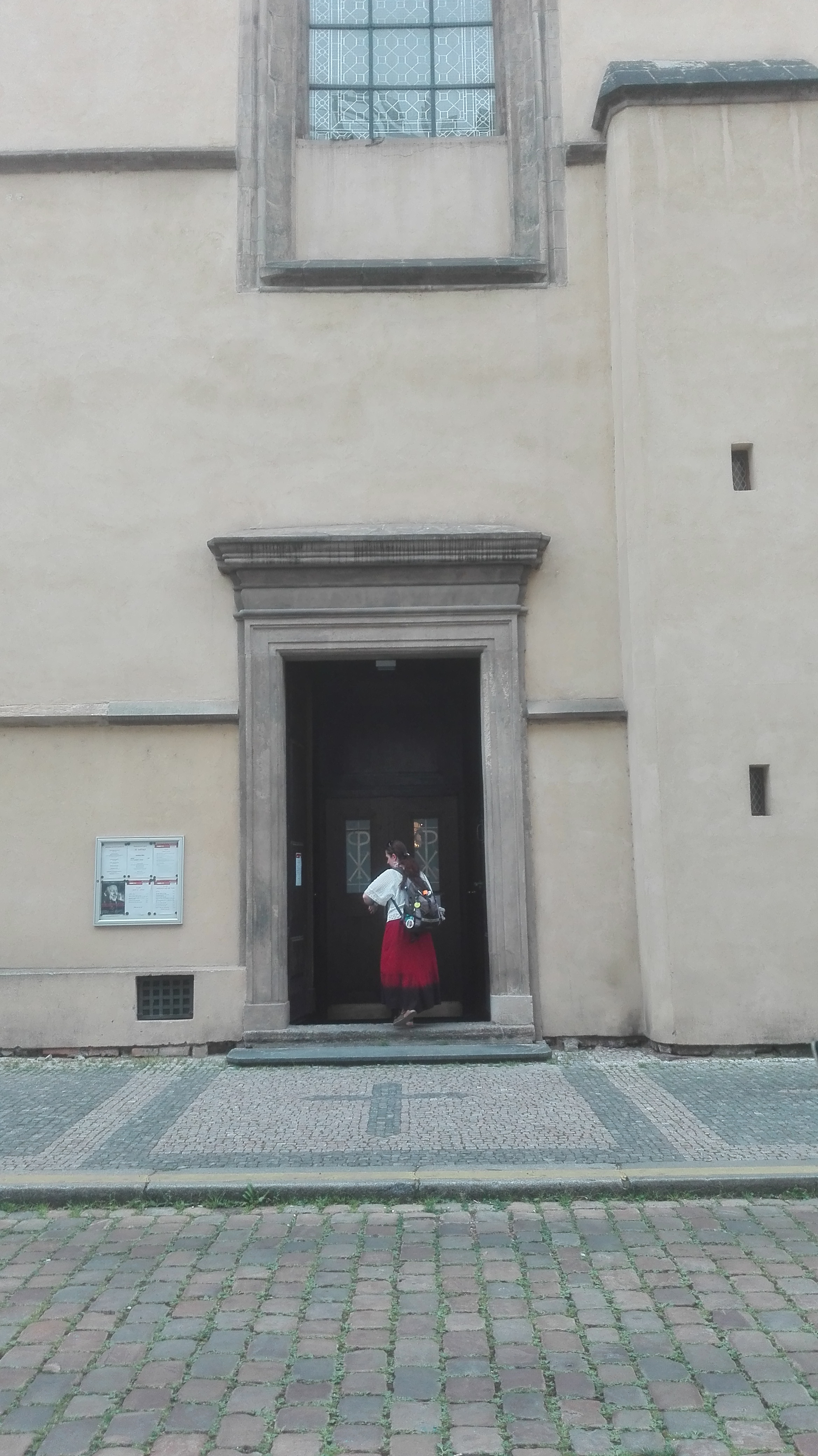
The entrance with a portal

=== Exterior ===
Today’s shape is irregular four nave church with tower above the western side of southern nave, with Sacristy by northern side of presbytery. From the outside, the temple appears to be plain without a distinct division. From facade stick up simple once graded supporting pillars with pent roofs. Prism shaped tower is covered with low ogee arch roof. The outlines of original pointed arch-windows are slightly visible and windows were lowered. The western entrance is emphasised by a portal.

=== Interior ===
==== Main nave ====
The main entrance of the church is allocated from the western part to enter into the narthex and the main nave. It is vaulted by four inconspicuous bays of Baroque barrel vault with lunettes. There are simple pilasters on second and third pillar and double pilasters on the other pillars. The original Gothic vault, which was roughly 1 m taller, is visible in the loft only. On the western part of the main nave there is renaissance matroneum, the room underneath is vaulted by groin vault. A small door leading to spiral staircase leading to matroneum is located at the south side of the entrance in the main nave. Presbytery and main nave are about 18 m tall. Between main and side naves there are semicircular vaulted arcades with cornices. Its original Gothic pointed-arch arcades are located on sides of side naves.

==== Choir ====
The choir is vaulted by a single bay barrel vault with lunettes, the apse consists of 5 sides of an octagon. The vault is lower than the original Gothic one. The walls are divided by double pilasters with Corinthian capitals. The original, Gothic windows were lowered and finished semicircular in Baroque reconstruction.

==== Southern nave ====
The southern nave is vaulted by Gothic rib vault with wedge-shaped ribs. Then it continues to bays corners onto cornice capitals, finished with prismatic console. Round keystones are plain and unadorned. On the southern nave there are original Gothic windows without tracery.

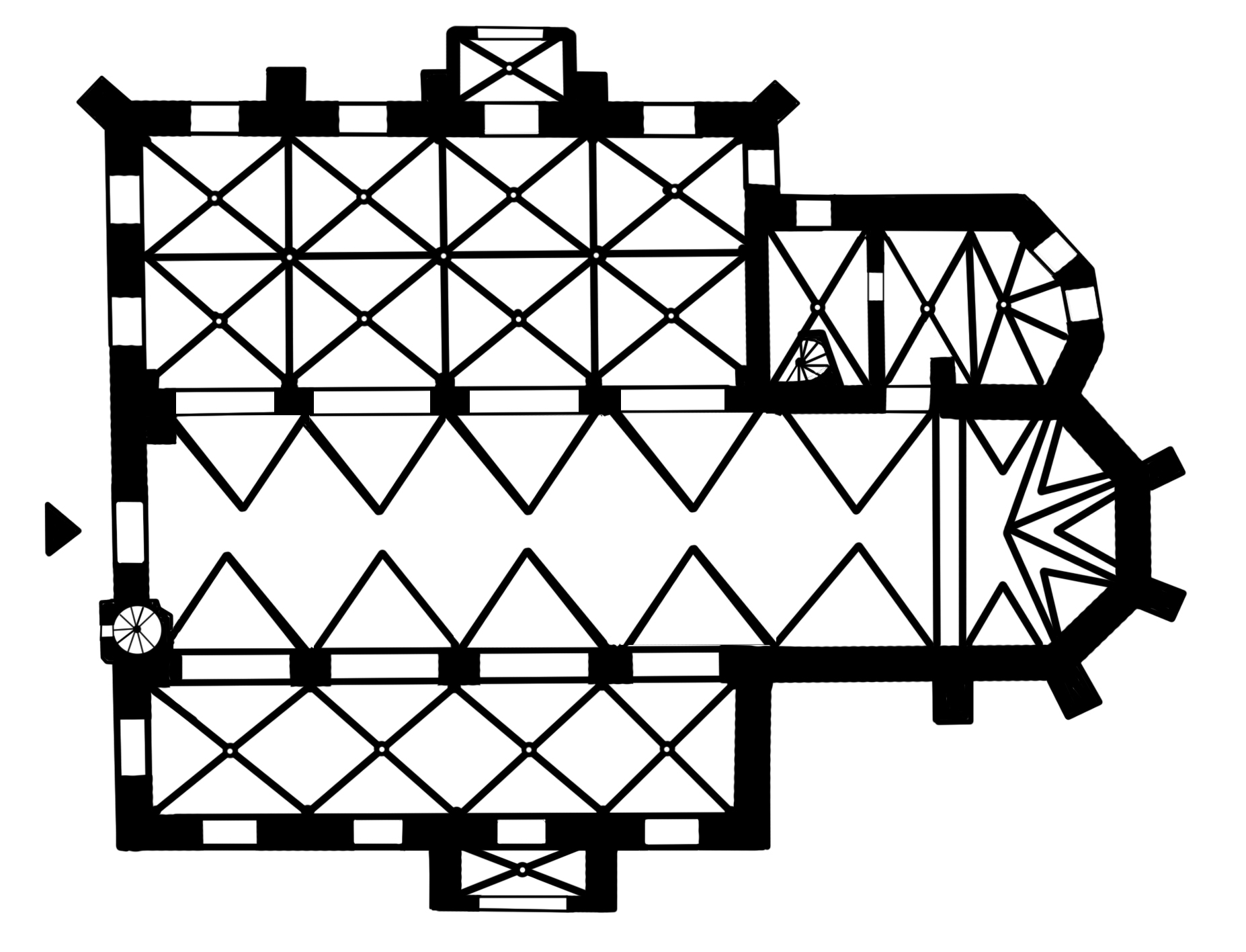
Floor plan of the church

==== Northern nave ====
On the opposite side of the church there is taller northern double-nave hall, rib vault, where the ribs are subtler. Supporting columns are also subtle with round base and on one side they consist of consoles with plant decoration below a mask of a wild man.

==== Porches ====
In front of the northern and southern portals there are two smaller porches. The northern one has a Gothic interior. The windows are wide with no tracery, they have a more complex profile and the window jamb similar to the window of the western facade illuminating the main nave and the northern portal to the double-nave. The other porch built in Baroque is covered with a hip roof, with an entry in the aedicula, vaulted by groin vault, similar to the vault under the matroneum. In front of the southern entrance there is a similar porch, vaulted by a barell vault with lunettes as in the main ship.

==== Sacristy ====
At the east part of the church - at the north side of the choir there is Gothic sacristy, vaulted by a complex, two bay rib vault. Subtle ribs are decorated with plant decoration which are connected to simple pyramidal and conical consoles around which the front arches are wrapped in the right angle. Between the vault-bays there is an inconspicuous partition that created a separate entrance to a spiral staircase that is leading to treasury above the sacristy. The sacristy was consecrated as a Chapel of All Saints in 1375. The paintings of Last Supper and Crucifixion which are now damaged and indistinct were presumably created in the same year.

==== Painted windows ====
Painted windows were created between 1884 and 1912. In presbytery they have a simple decoration and were created in 1884. In the side naves they are decorated with figural paintings - st. Agnese (1885), st. Cecilia (1906), Ludmila (1910), Wenceslaus and Ferdinand (1912), and st. Joseph.

== Gallery ==
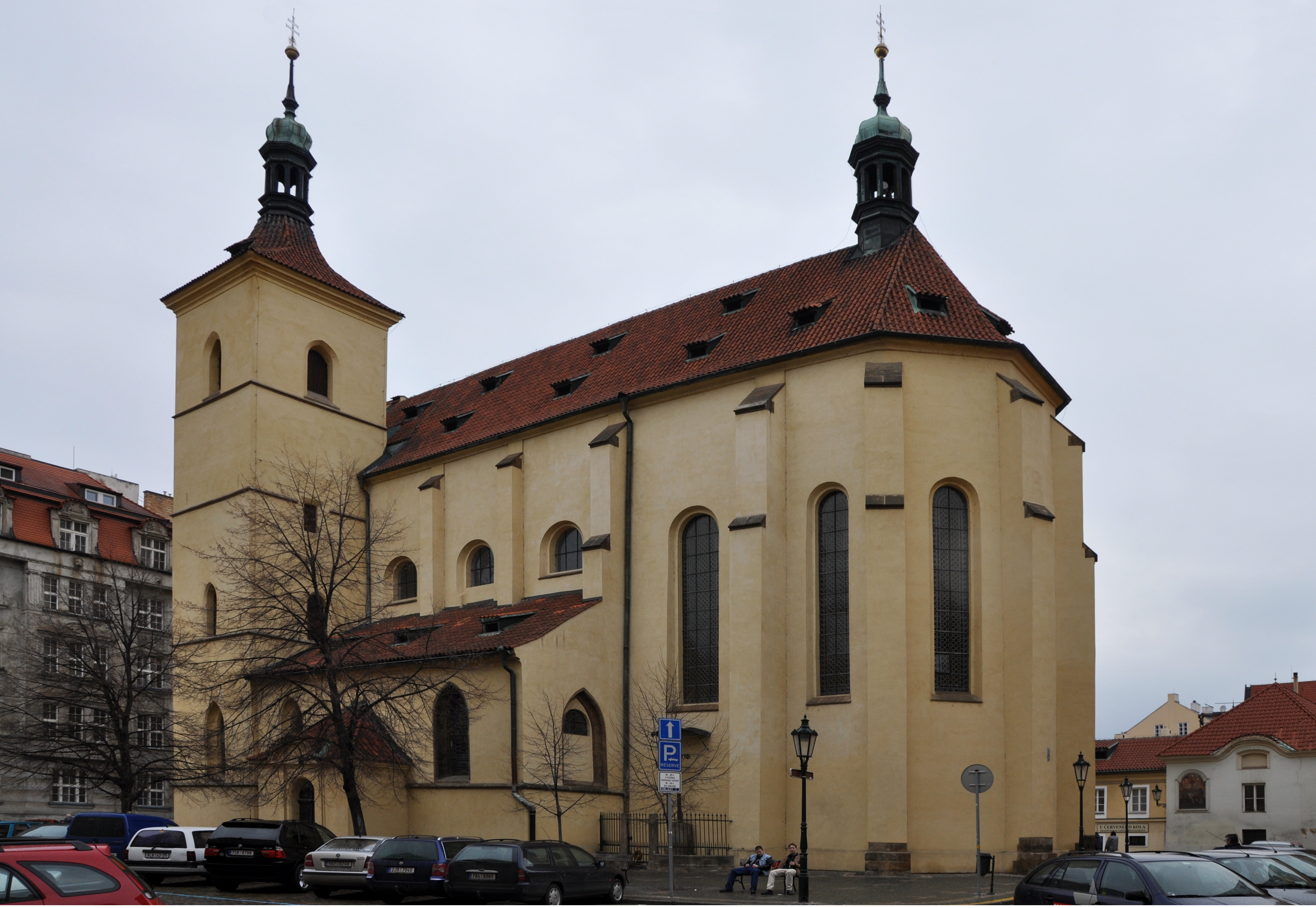
Southeastern view

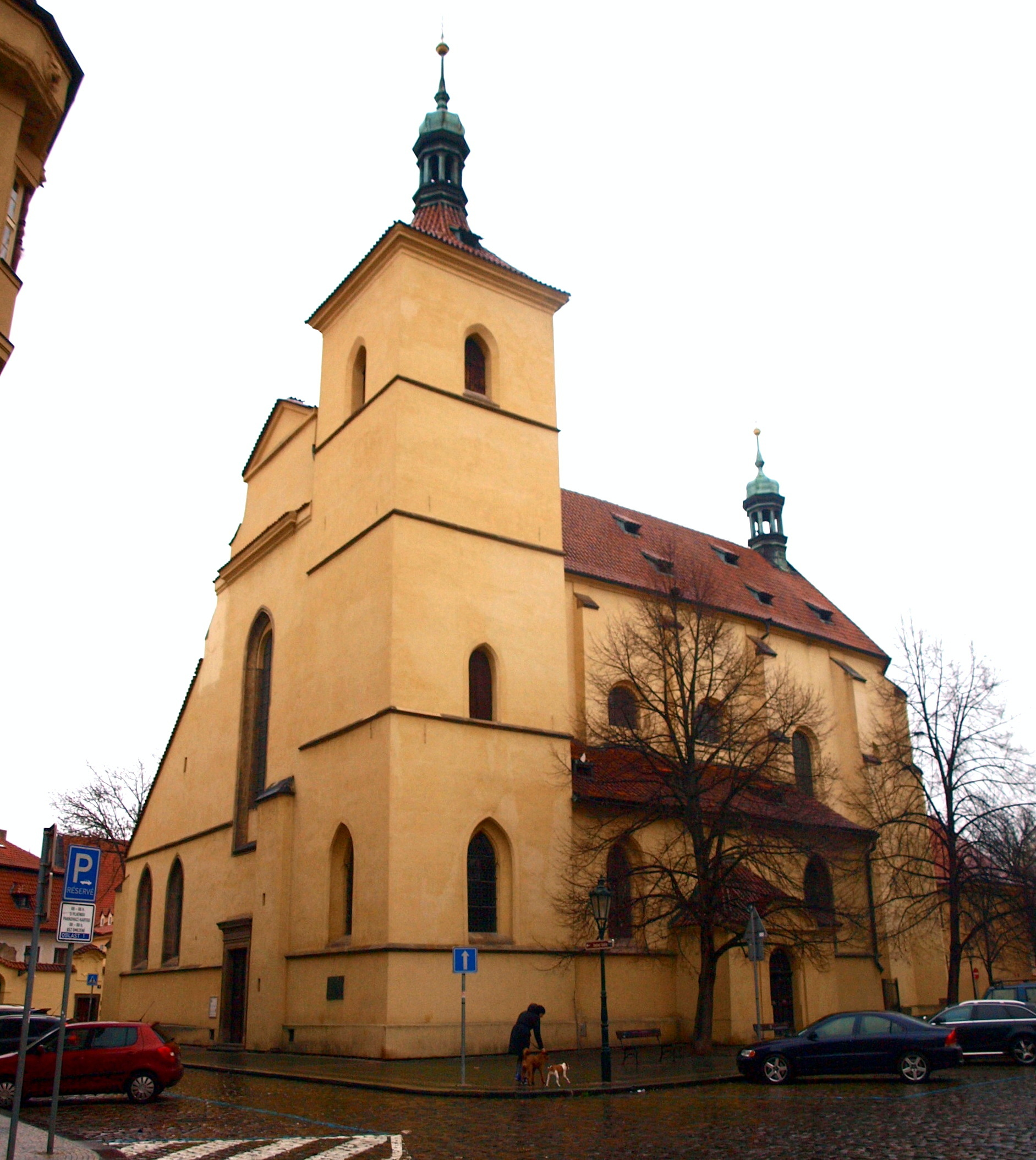
Southwestern view

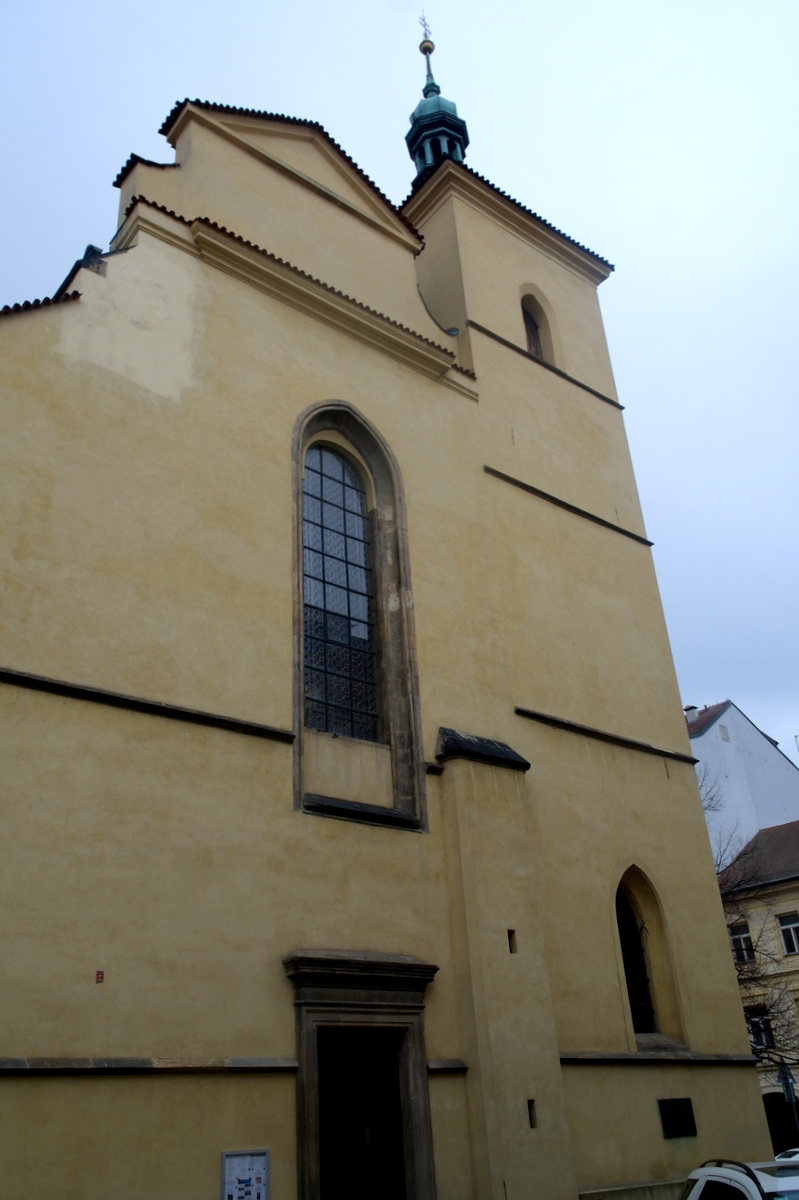
Gothic window in today's Baroque form

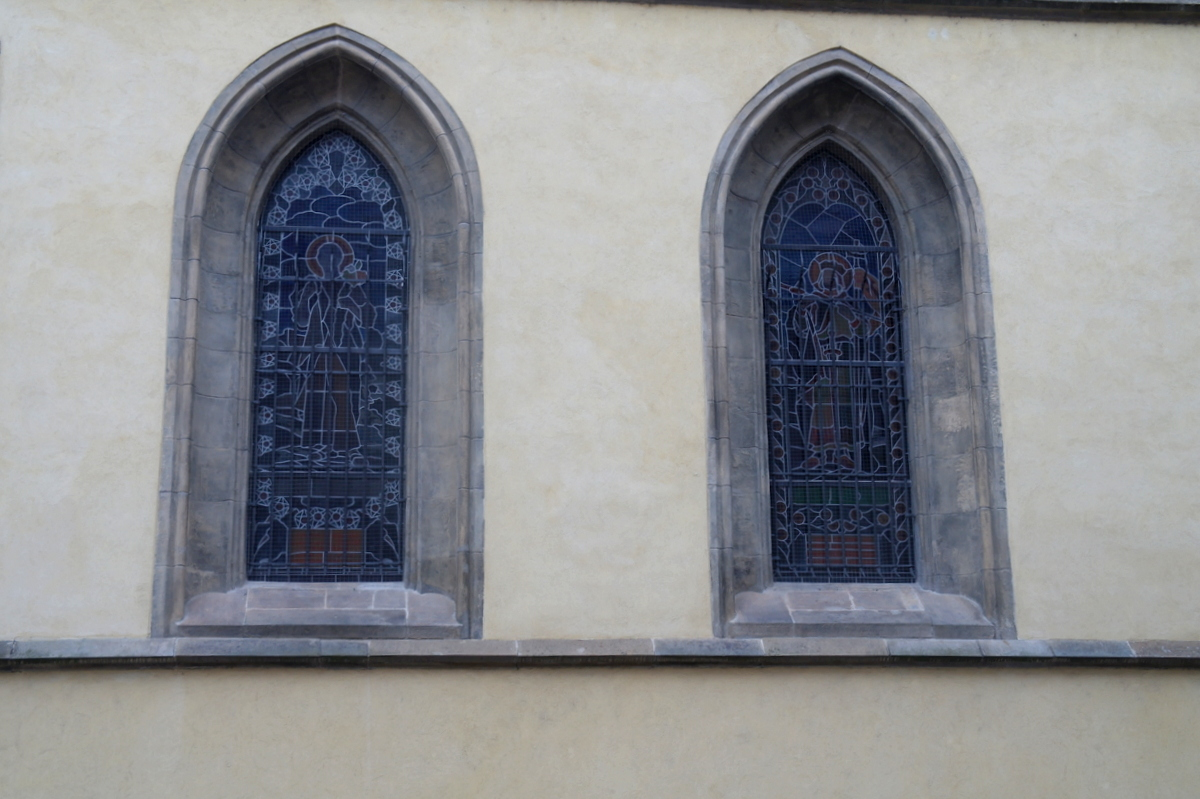
Painted windows on the western side of the northern nave

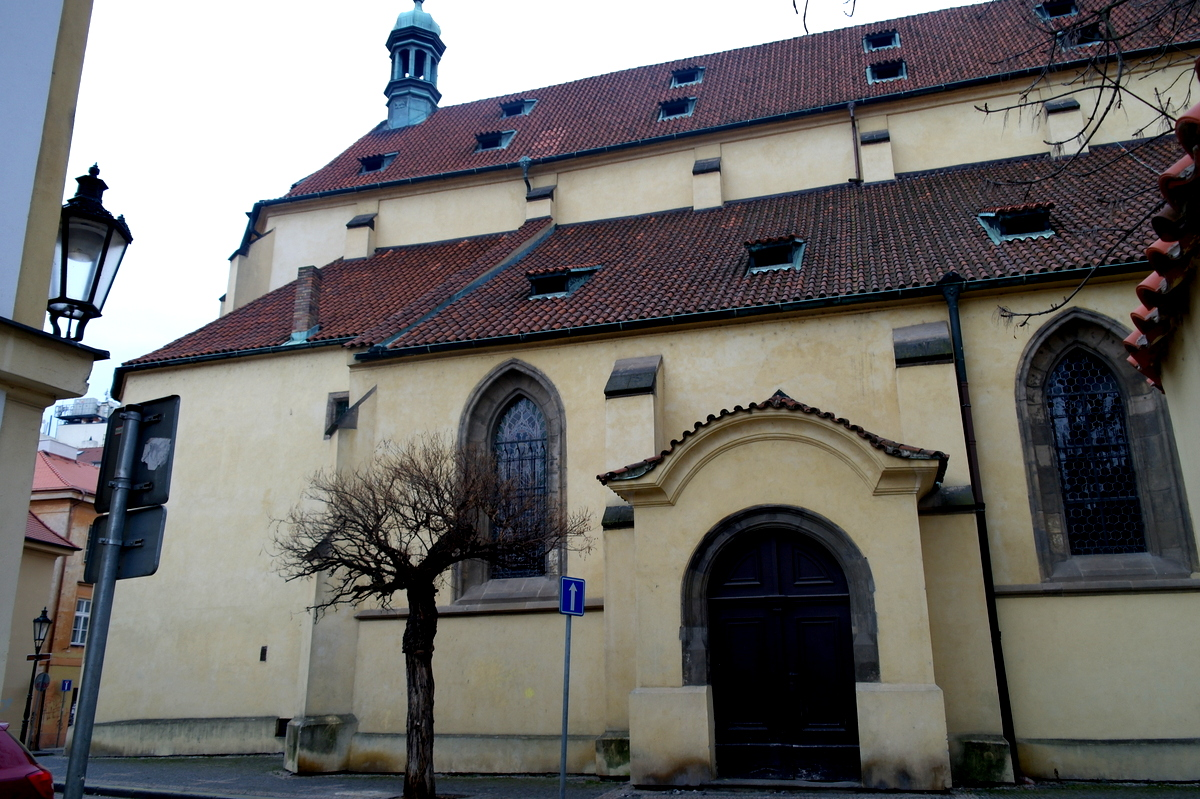
Gothich windows in the northern nave

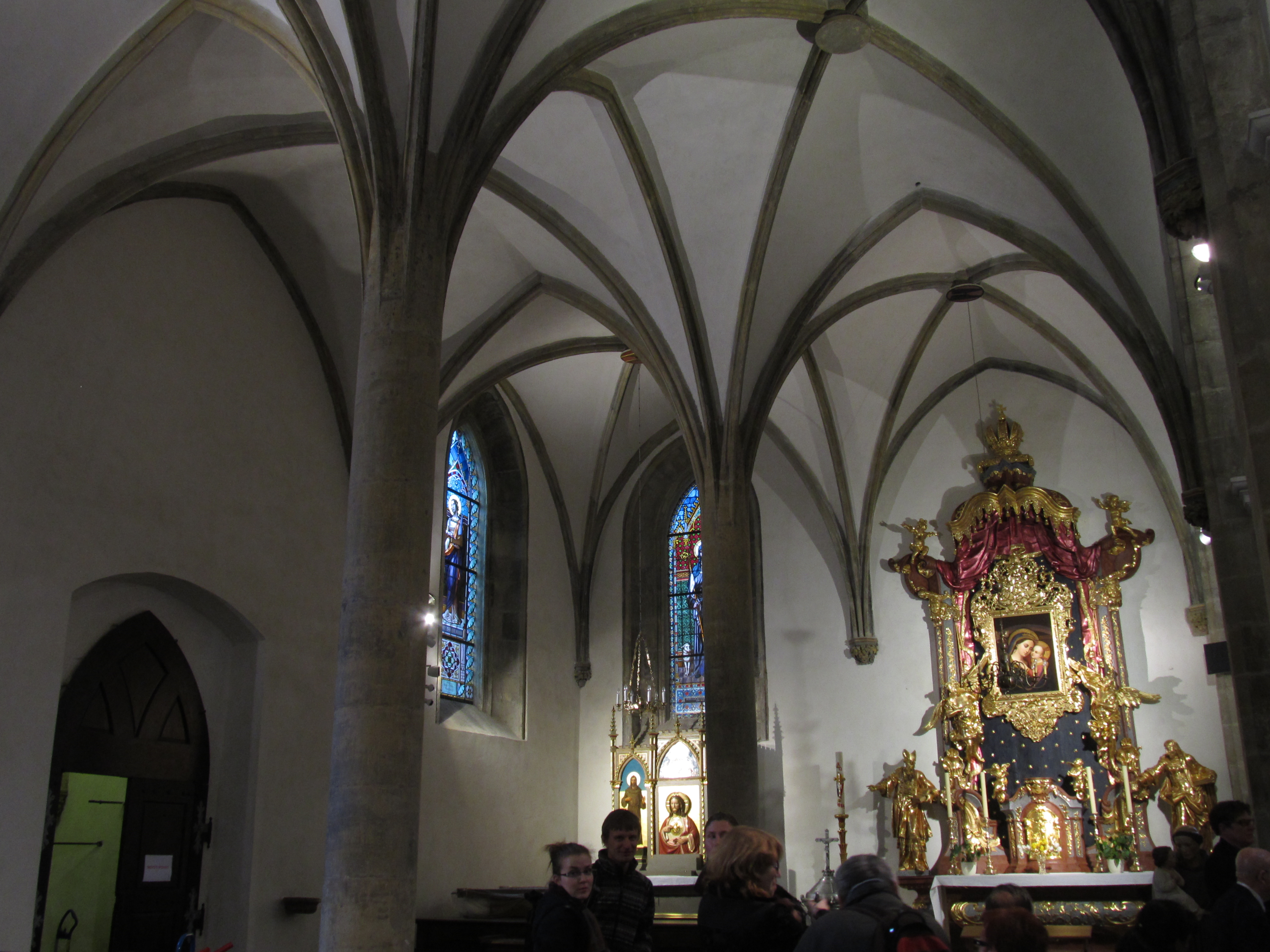
Gothic rib vault in the northern nave

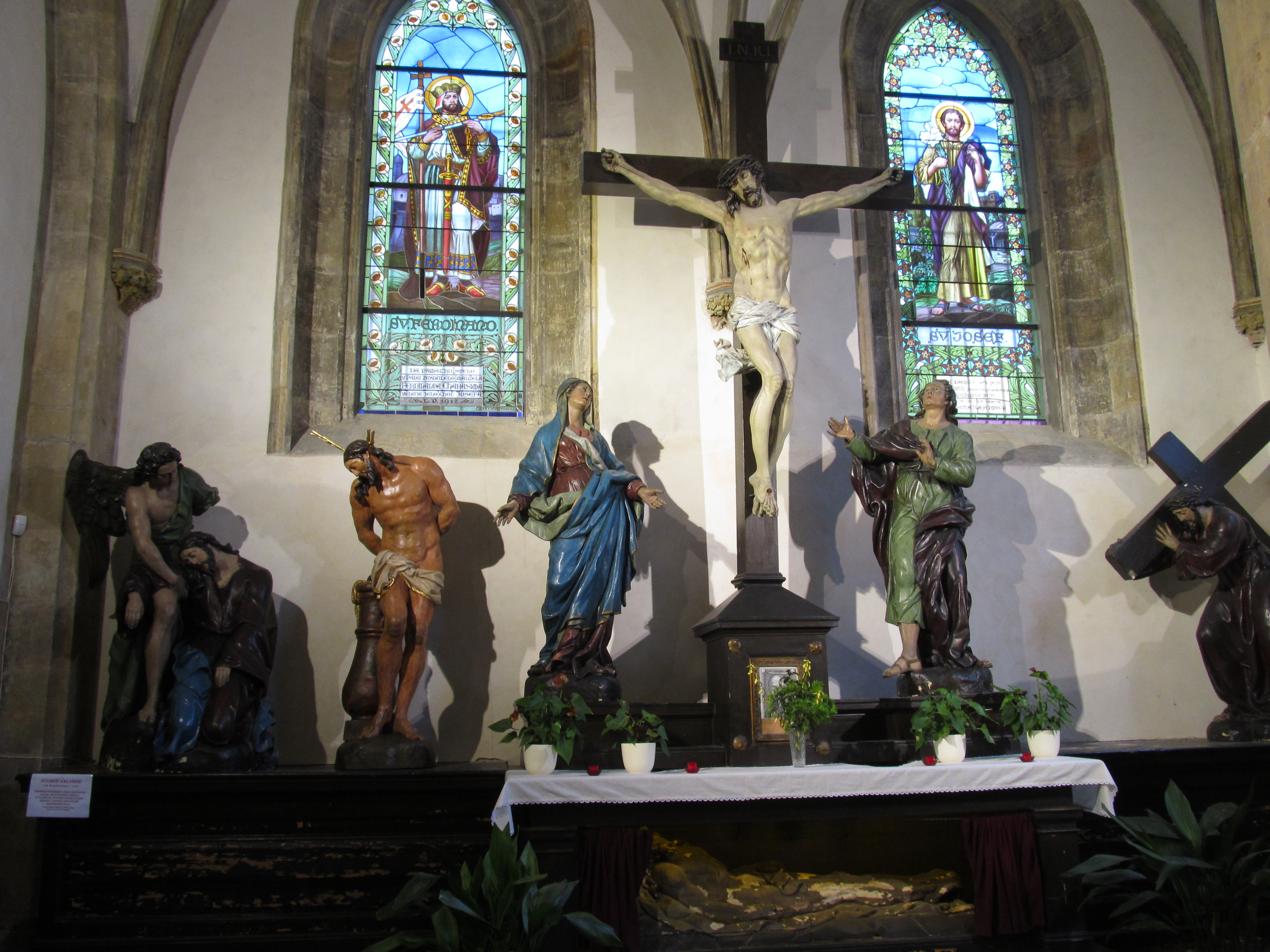
Altar in the northern nave, painted windows

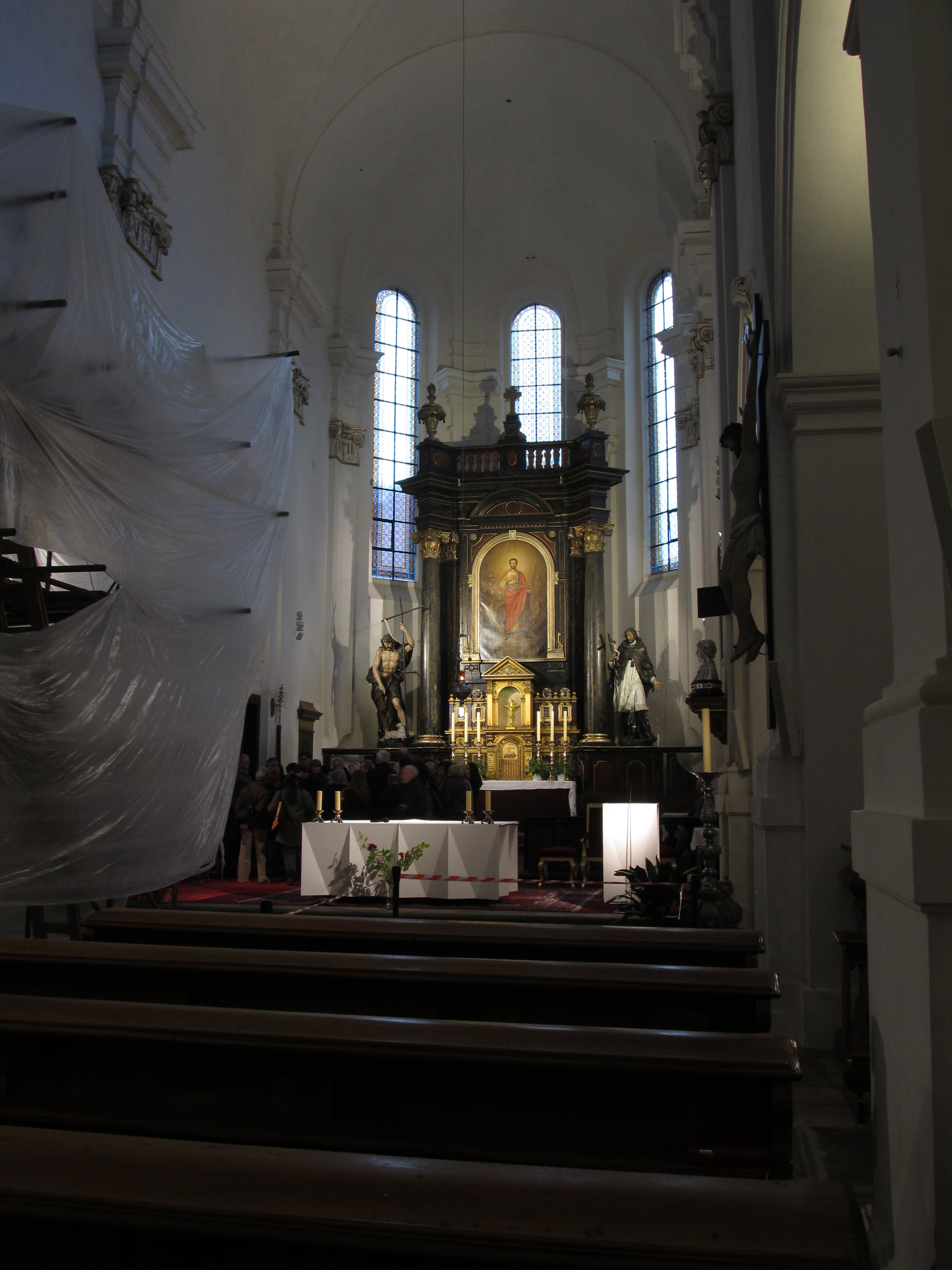
Main altar

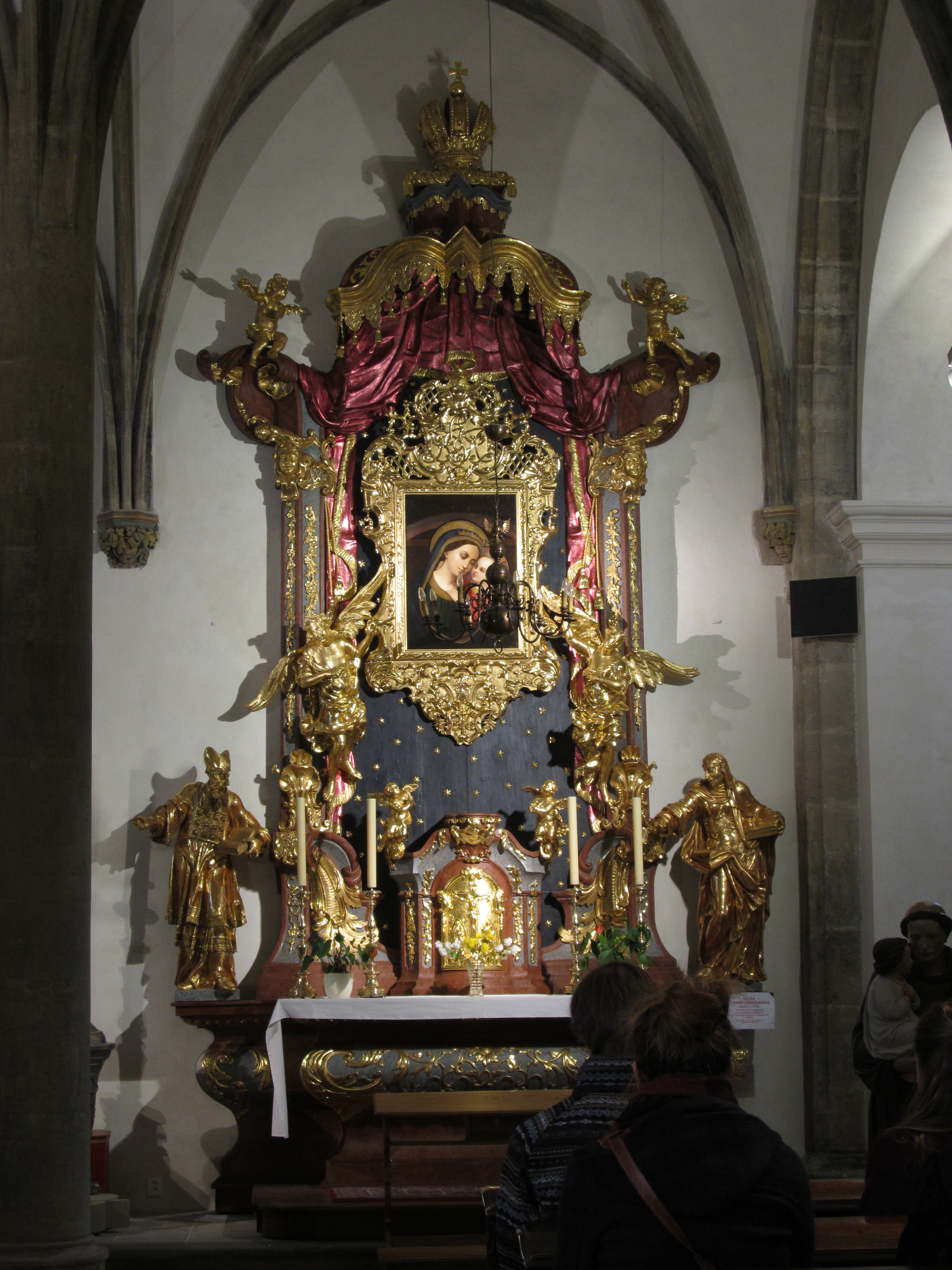
Altar in the southern nave

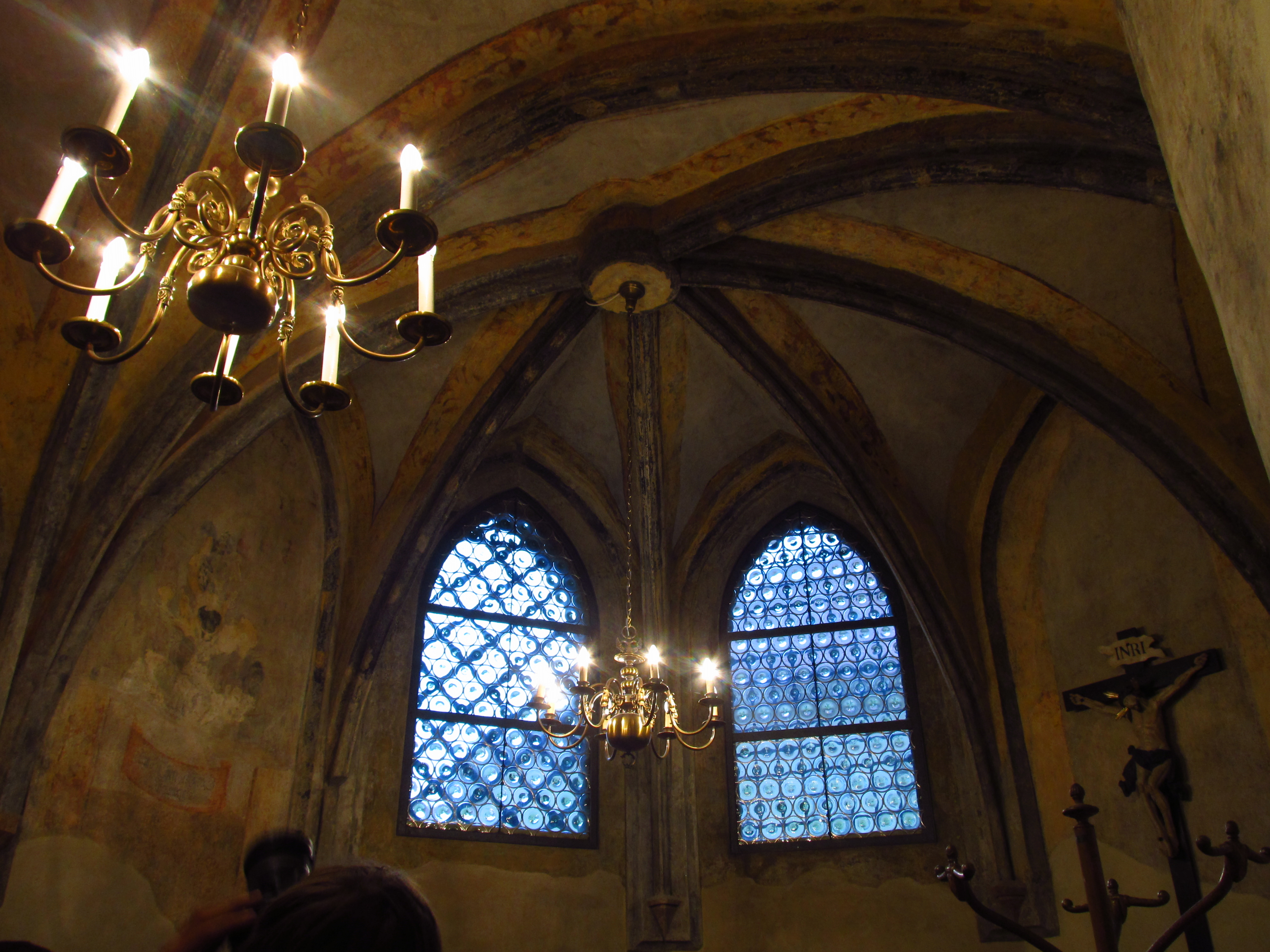
Gothic vault in the sacristy

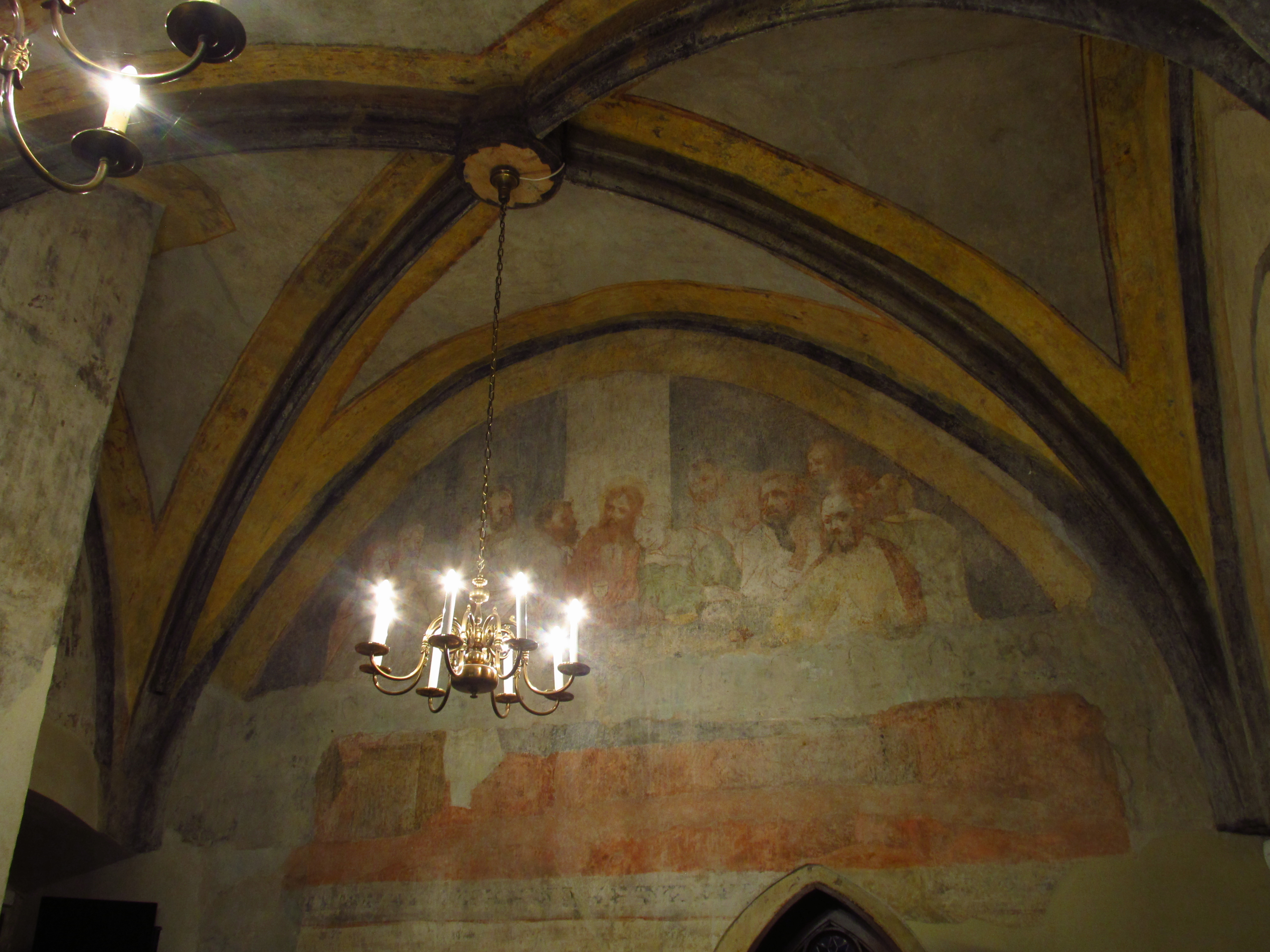
Last Supper painting in the sacristy

== Literature ==
- P. Vlček, Umělecké památky Prahy - Vydavateľstvo Academia, 2012, ISBN 978-80-200-2107-6 (czech)
- D. Líbal, Pražské gotické kostely - Antoník Kovanda, 1946 (czech)
- D. Líbal, Katalog gotické architektury v České republice do husitských válek - Unicornis, 2001, ISBN 80-901587-8-1 (czech)
