= Doubravice (Trutnov District) =

- Municipality
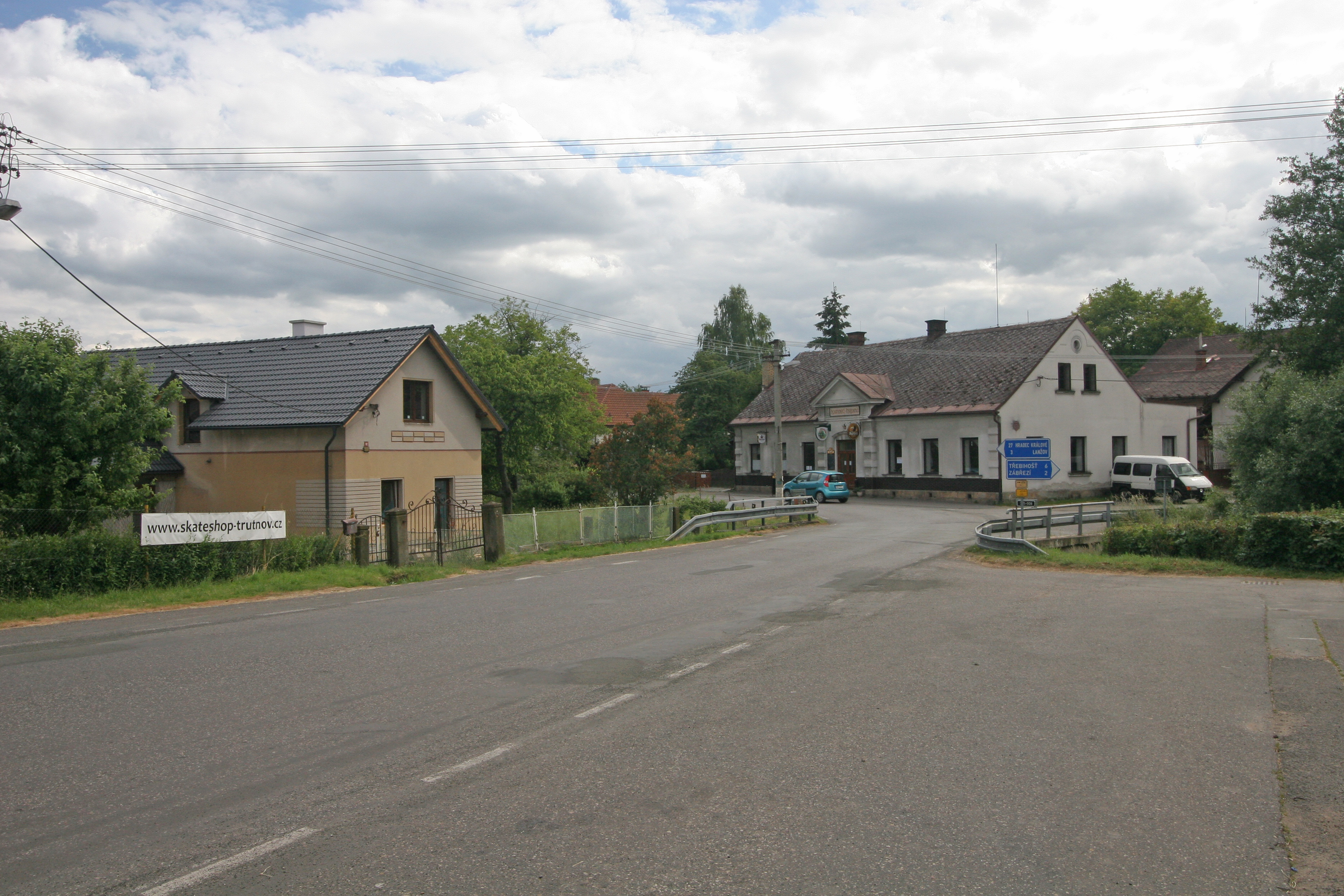
- Crossroads in the centre of Doubravice

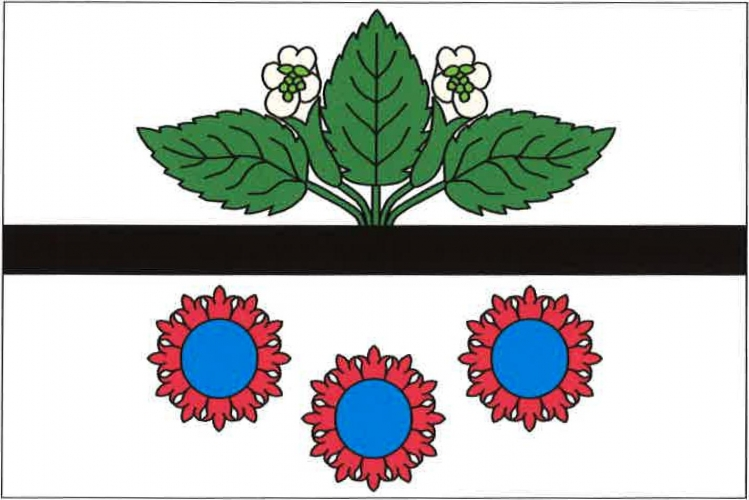
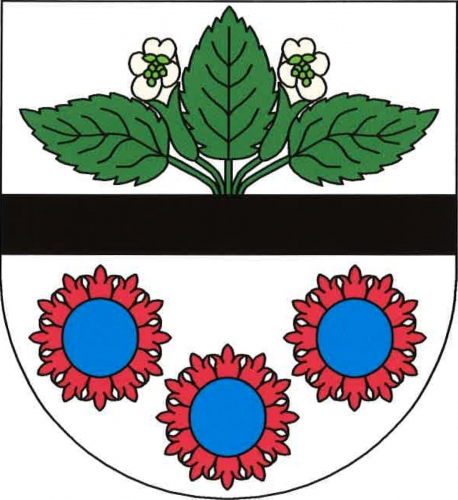
- Flag Coat of arms

- Location in the Czech Republic
- Coordinates: 50°24′20″N 15°45′43″E
- Country: Czech Republic
- Region: Hradec Králové
- District: Trutnov
- First mentioned: 1542

Area
  - Total: 5.66 km^{2} (2.19 sq mi)
- Elevation: 387 m (1,270 ft)

Population (2026-01-01)
  - Total: 394
  - Density: 69.6/km^{2} (180/sq mi)
- Time zone: UTC+1 (CET)
  - Summer (DST): UTC+2 (CEST)
- Postal codes: 544 01, 544 51
- Website: www.doubravice.cz

Doubravice is a municipality and village in Trutnov District in the Hradec Králové Region of the Czech Republic. It has about 400 inhabitants.

== Administrative division ==
Doubravice consists of three municipal parts (in brackets population according to the 2021 census):

- Doubravice (300)
- Velehrádek (28)
- Zálesí (37)

== Demographics ==
Historical population
Year	Pop.	±%
1869	917	—
1880	876	−4.5%
1890	966	+10.3%
1900	930	−3.7%
1910	885	−4.8%
1921	883	−0.2%
1930	938	+6.2%
1950	654	−30.3%
1961	596	−8.9%
1970	494	−17.1%
1980	441	−10.7%
1991	383	−13.2%
2001	367	−4.2%
2011	367	+0.0%
2021	365	−0.5%
Source: Censuses

== Notable people ==
- Zbyněk Žába (1917–1971), Egyptologist
