= Insinger Papyrus =

Ancient Egyptian papyrus

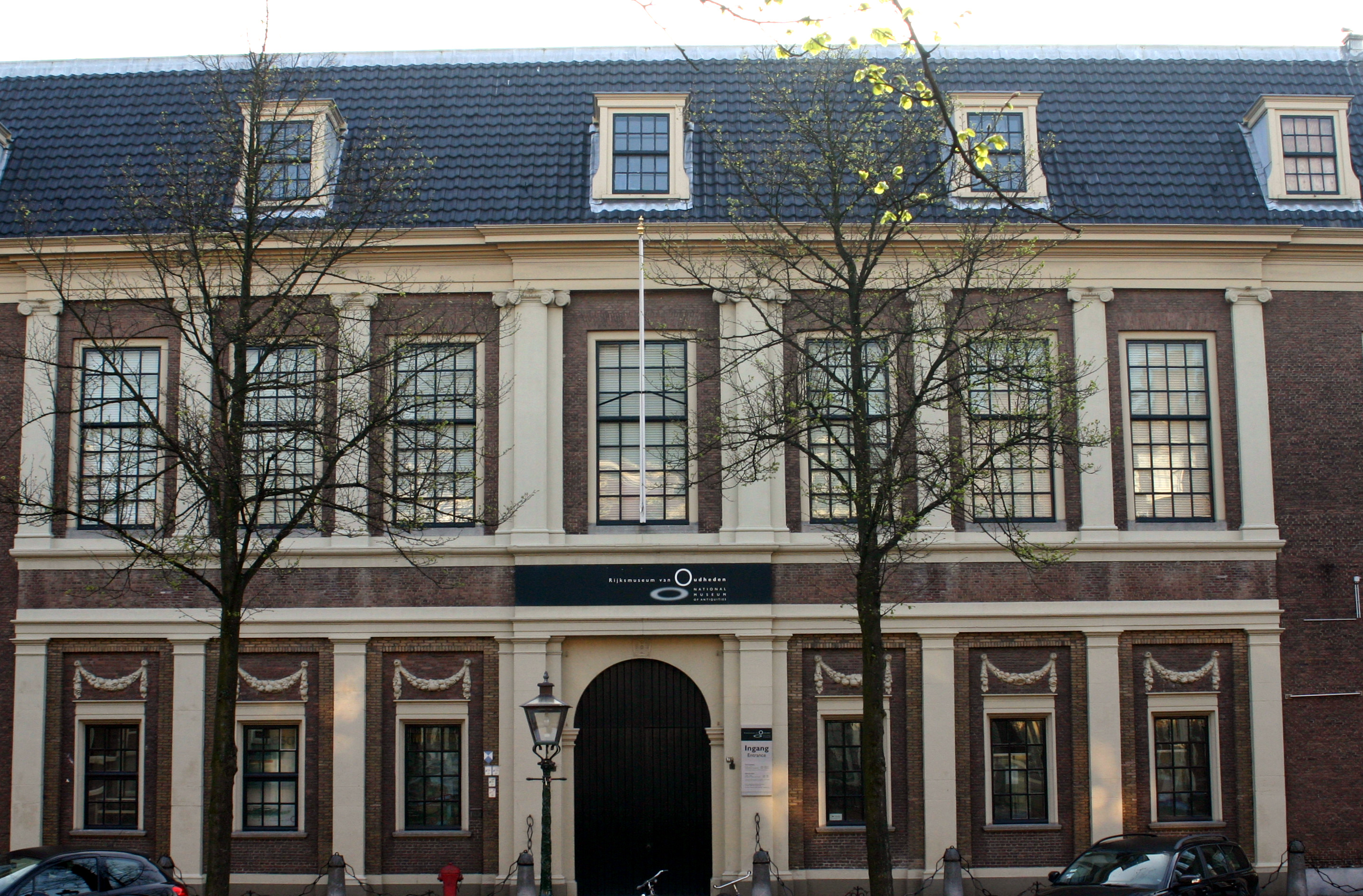
The Insinger Papyrus is kept at the Rijksmuseum van Oudheden.

Insinger Papyrus (Papyrus Insinger) is a papyrus find from ancient Egypt and contains one of the oldest extant writings about Egyptian wisdom teachings (Sebayt). The manuscript is dated to around the 1st century BC according to the Rijksmuseum van Oudheden in Leiden where the main part is kept. Other sources suggest it dates to the 1st century AD, and to the 3rd century BC. Fragments have also been found in other collections.

== Contents ==
The Insinger Papyrus is a fragmented papyrus scroll with the beginning and end of the scroll missing, the size is about 612 × 27.5 cm (241 × 10,5 inches). The text is written on the rectoside.

The text is an example of the ancient Egyptian literature genre wisdom teachings (Sebayt) and shows that Egyptian traditions persisted even under foreign rule and how they were adapted to the requirements of new times.

The manuscript is a collection of writings and includes 25 surviving chapters.

The scripture is broken down into different themes with numbered chapters and contains over 800 maxims.

The maxims are written as one-liners similar to a proverb, examples are:

- "A hissing of a snake is more effective than the braying of a donkey"
- "A small snake bears poison"
- "A snake on which one steps ejects a strong poison"
- "A crocodile does not die from worrying, it dies from hunger"
- "It is the god who bestows prosperity, it is the wise man who preserves it"

The text is written in demotic and the manuscript is dated between year 0 and 100 AD around the Greek period and the Roman period. It is probably a transcript of an earlier manuscript.

== History ==
It is not known when the scroll was discovered. In 1895, the scroll was sold in Akhmim by French businessman Frenay to Dutch photographer and antique dealer Jan Herman Insinger. Insinger then lived in Luxor where he among other things worked with Gaston Maspero.

The manuscript is the most comprehensive and significant of the preserved texts in the genre of wisdom teachings, one of the oldest genres in ancient Egyptian literature. In contrast to other extant wisdom teachings emphasizing proper social behavior, the Insinger Papyrus puts the emphasis on ethically correct behavior.

In 1922, the Dutchman Pieter Adriaan Aart Boeser published the first transcription and translation in the article "Transkription und Übersetzung des Papyrus Insinger" in Internationales Archiv für Ethnographie (OMRO, vol 26).

In 1926, the Czech František Lexa published a transcription with commentaries and interpretations in French in the book Papyrus Insinger.

In the late 1970s, Karl-Theodor Zauzich (attendant for the University of Pennsylvania Museum of Archaeology and Anthropology – Penn Museum) discovered three additional fragments in the Museum's collections belonging to the Insinger Papyrus. These were bought for the museum in Egypt in 1910.

The archive number of the papyrus at Rijksmuseum van Oudheden is F 95 / 5.1 and E 16333 A-C at the Penn Museum.

== See also ==
- List of ancient Egyptian papyri
