= Romana Rotterová =

Czech printmaker (1931–2022)

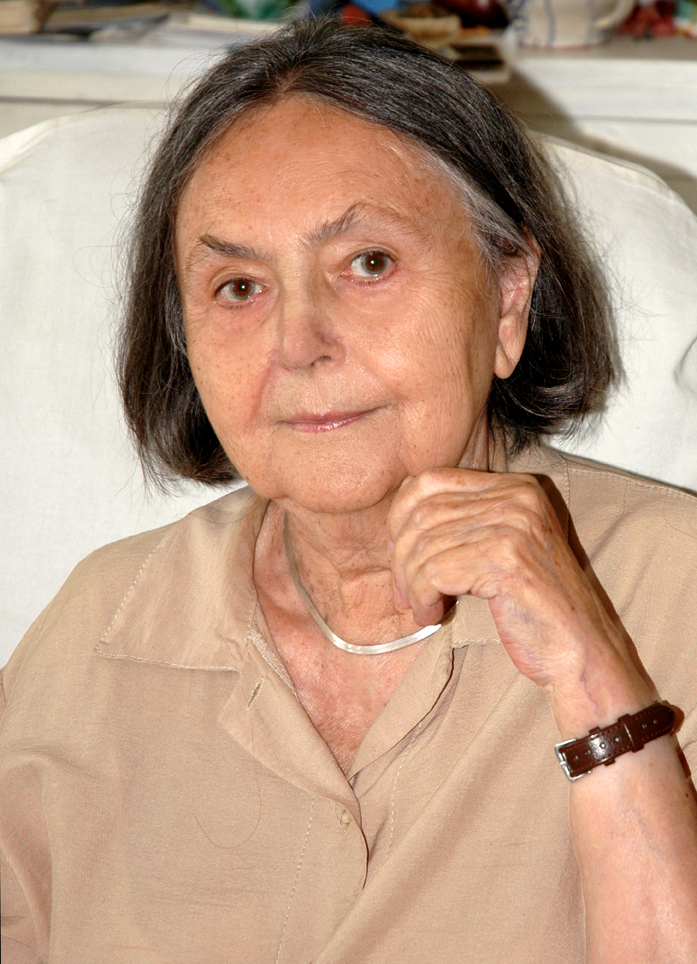
Portrait of Rotterová

Romana Rotterová (17 October 1931 – 30 August 2022) was a Czech printmaker, sculptor, textile artist, illustrator and poet.

== Biography ==
Romana Rotterová was the child of the sculptor Leonard Rotter and his wife Julie, with whom she initially studied sculpture.

She also worked under Mary Duras and Vratislav Jan Žižka. Poor health lead her to pursue a career in printmaking instead. She was especially known for her work in intaglio and drypoint.

Two of Rotterová's prints are owned by the National Gallery of Art. Two more are in the collection of the Smart Museum of Art.

== Life and education ==
Romana Rotterová was born on 17 October 1931 in Prague, as the only child of the sculptor Leonard Rotter and his wife Julie. As a child, she had spent a lot of time with her father in his atelier in Malá Strana, where she observed his work, learned the base of visual art, and later on studied sculpture. Romana Rotterová has also learned from the Vienna-born Czech sculptor Mary Duras. While working as a commercial artist in her late teens and early twenties, she met Vratislav Jan Žižka, who introduced her to the art of printmaking and she has created her first prints in his studio.

Rotterová died on 30 August 2022, at the age of 90.

== Work ==
At the beginning of her work, Romana Rotterová devoted herself to drawing, smaller sculptural formats (terracotta plaquettes), commercial art, illustrations of prose and poetry collections, and scientific illustration.

After 1963, she focused on printmaking, using black and white etching, intaglio, and dry point techniques in a combination with structural graphics. Similar to sculptural work, a graphic sheet is often preceded by a preparatory drawing. By gradually wiping the color from the matrix during printing, plasticity and contrast are achieved, similar to removing clay when modeling a sculpture. Larger formats and demanding techniques allow the production of only a few prints, which have the character of a monotype. Color is used sparingly to create bold accents.

The graphic work from the mid-1960s still reflects the creative impulses of the informal in the emphasis on surface structures and interprets real landscapes or their material elements in the form of simplified symbols (Blue Cloud 1966). Figurative motifs are usually only in form of a hint (Closing 1966), frequent inspiration is music (The Sound of the Flute 1965, Harp 1987) and ancient Greece (Karyatida 1972, Dream of Greece-Olymp 1972).

Gradually, the element of individual experience, existential anxiety (Closure 1966) and borderline situations in interpersonal relationships (Relationships III 1970) are emphasized more, everything superfluous disappears from the surface. Reality is replaced by artistic signs, the effect is achieved by creating tension between reduced shapes, depth and density of lines and contrasts of bright surfaces and shadows. The names of the graphic sheets also correspond to this – from primal reflections of the real world using color accents (Old sun 1965, Little red crate 1968) to abstract feelings expressed only by contrasts of black and white (Hesitation 1968, Concentration 1968).

In the 1990s, the degree of abstraction was perfected, the maximum effect was achieved with the use of meditative symbols and subtle values (Paths of Light 1990, Little Silence 1991), the subject of the depiction became a landscape of inner experiences (Landscape reading 1993, Landscape concert 1993).

== Collections ==
- National Gallery Prague
- Museum of Modern Art, New York
- National Gallery of Art, Washington
- Museum of Contemporary Art, Los Angeles
- National Museum of Women in the Arts, Washington D.C.
- Museum Jan Heestershuis, Schijndel, Netherlands
- The Regional Gallery of Fine Arts, Zlín
- Olomouc Museum of Art
- Regional Gallery in Jihlava
- The Gallery of Visual Art in Hodonín
- Private collections home and abroad

== Awards ==
- 1976 Woman in contemporary art, Hollar, Prague
- 1993 Award for Non-traditional Graphical Expression, Inter-Kontakt-Grafik, Prague
- 2003 Grafix 2003, Small prints Biennale, Břeclav

== Exhibitions ==
=== Solo ===
- 1967 Expo 1967, Montreal
- 1968 Prints, Gallery D, Portheimka, Prague
- 1987 Prints, Theater of music, Olomouc
- 1990 Romana Rotterová - prints, Jana Čubrdová - ceramic sculptures, OGVU Náchod
- 1990 Prints, Monastery Opařany
- 1991 Romana Rotterová - Processes and journeys (prints), Institute of macromolecular chemistry ČSAV, Prague
- 1992 Prints, Kassel
- 1992/93 Romana Rotterová - prints, textile, Ars viva, Umělecký klub, Prague
- 1993 Romana Rotterová a Jaroslav Synek - prints and objects, Gallery Hertolt, Strakonice
- 1993 Romana Rotterová - prints, drawings, MK, Artotéka Opatov, Prague
- 1993 Romana Rotterová - prints, aradekor, Ars viva, Future, Prague
- 2004 Romana Rotterová - prints, work selection, Pastoral center of Saint Thomas, Dobříš
- 2006 Meeting: Inge Kosková, drawings - Romana Rotterová, prints, Gallery Šternberk
- 2007 Romana Rotterová - Little Silence (prints from years 1960-90), KP Školská, Prague
- 2011 Metamorfózy (retrospective exhibition of prints), KD Dobříš
- 2011 Romana Rotterová - Records (drawings), Pastoral center of Saint Thomas, Dobříš
- 2013 Romana Rotterová - prints, tapestry, Gallery of Fine Arts in Náchod
- 2014 Romana Rotterová - Concentration, Gallery of Josip Plečnik, Prague
- 2016 Romana Rotterová - Journey, Horácká Gallery in Nové Město na Moravě

=== Collective (selected) ===
- 1966 AICA, Moravian Gallery, Brno; Youth Illustrations, Gallery Fronta, Prague
- 1967 Czechoslovakian prints, Kiel, Hamburg; 1. Salon, Czechoslovak Pavilion, Prague; Internationale Graphik, Gallery Arctica, Cuxhaven
- 1968 Czechoslovakian prints, Brussels, Munich, Hamburg, New York, Montreal; Nine women printmakers, Gallery D, Prague, MG Písek; 1. Biennale – prints research, Jihlava
- 1969 2. Salon, Hybernia Theatre, Prague; Czechoslovakian prints, Berlin, Toronto, Brussels, Hamburg, Oregon; Touring print exhibition, Netherlands, Switzerland
- 1970 Czechoslovakian prints, EXIMA, Munich; Expo 1969, Osaka
- 1971 Book Fair, Frankfurt
- 1976 Woman in contemporary art, Hollar, Prague
- 1979 Czechoslovakian prints, Helsinki, Tampere, Turku
- 1988 Salon of Prague visual artists, Czechoslovak Pavilion, Prague
- 1989 Contemporary Czech prints, Mánes, Prague; Tapestry exhibition, Gallery Klenová; Salon of commercial art, Czechoslovak Pavilion, Prague
- 1990 SČG František Kupka, Musaion, Prague; Czech Alternative, ÚLUV, Prague; Symbol of the Freedom of Czechoslovakia, BKH Fine Art Gallery, Los Angeles
- 1991 SČG František Kupka, member exhibition, Gallery Chodov, Prague; Prints trienale „Prague Graphic 91“, Gallery Modrý pavilon, Prague
- 1992 Experimental prints from Bohemia, Berlin
- 1993 Meditative prints from Bohemia, Graz; Trienale of European prints, Interkontakt 93, Prague
- 1994 Prints biennale, Gallery Chagal, Ostrava
- 1995 Laureates of Trienale and Prints of the year, Central-european gallery, Prague
- 1996 Temple Bar International Prints, Dublin
- 1997 Print of the year, The Old Town Hall, Prague
- 2005 The places of memory, Gallery Šternberk
- 2006/7 Focused vies (60s prints), Regional Gallery in Liberec; Regional Gallery in Jihlava
- 2007 Hluboká tajemnost Tao, Small gallery of Česká spořitelna, Kladno; Gallery Pod věží, Třeboň
- 2007 Lidice Memorial
- 2008 Corpus delicti, GVU Havlíčkův Brod
- 2009 Hluboká tajemnost Tao, Gallery Pod věží, Třeboň

== Bibliography ==
- Romana Rotterová, catalogue of authors, Borovička J, 1968, SČVU Prague
- Romana Rotterová, catalogue of authors, Kapusta J, 1987, Divadlo hudby, Olomouc
- Obrazová encyklopedie české grafiky 80. let, 1993, Hošková-Vomočilová S, Schleppe S, ed., SGN Prague, 255 p., ISBN 80-901559-0-1
- Soustředěný pohled /Focussed view (grafika 60. let...), 2007, Drury R a kol., Rada galerií ČR, Prague, 179 p., ISBN 978-80-903422-2-4
- Romana Rotterová, catalogue, Lomová O, Jirousová V, 2008, Gallery Lidice
- Romana Rotterová, catalogue of authors, not dated, V. Jirousová
- Romana Rotterová, Pocta dokonalým, 162 p., 2010, Centrum Spirála, ISBN 978-80-7272-224-2
- Romana Rotterová, catalogue of authors, 100 p., Kapusta J. st., Kapusta J, 2013, GVU Náchod, ISBN 978-80-87069-50-9

== Illustrations ==
- Epos o Gilgamešovi, 1971, Mladá fronta, Prague
- Hvězdy na nebi, lidé na zemi, 1974, Máj, Prague
- Jiří Orten: Osud, 2006, Odeon, ISBN 80-207-1209-7
