= Zbyněk Žába =

Zbyněk Žába (19 June 1917 – 15 August 1971) was a Czech Egyptologist.

== Life ==
Žába was born on 19 June 1917 in Doubravice, Bohemia. In 1945, Zbyněk Žába commenced his studies on the subject and in 1949 he became an assistant to František Lexa. In 1954, Žába was named an associate professor of Egyptology, and in 1960 he was chosen to be the director of the Czechoslovak Institute of Egyptology, an institution founded in 1958 and originally led by Lexa.

Žába died on 15 August 1971.

== Works ==
- L'orientation astronomique dans l'ancienne Egypte, et la précession de l'axe du monde. Prague: Académie tchécoslovaque des Sciences. 1953.
- Papyrus vezíra Ptaḥ hotepa. Ze staré egypštiny přel. Prague: Lyra Pragensis, t. Stráž, Vimperk. 1971.
- The rock inscriptions of lower Nubia. Prague: Charles University. 1974.

== See also ==
- List of Egyptologists
