= František Lexa =

Czech Egyptologist

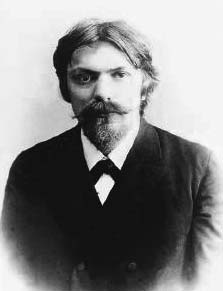
František Lexa in 1926

František Lexa (5 April 1876 – 13 February 1960) was a Czech Egyptologist.

== Biography ==
Lexa was born on 5 April 1876 in Pardubice. He began his career as a secondary school teacher. Having learnt the Egyptian language by himself, he became the first person to translate and publish Egyptian texts into Czech in 1905. Lexa spent the rest of his career at Charles University in Prague, first as a private senior lecturer of Egyptology in 1919, then an associate professor in 1922, then Czechoslovakia's first Professor for Egyptology in 1927, and finally the first director of the Czechoslovak Institute of Egyptology in 1958. Lexa's students included Jaroslav Černý and Zbyněk Žába. He died on 13 February 1960 in Prague.

== Works ==
- Papyrus Insinger (in French, Librairie orientaliste: P. Geuthner, Paris; 1926)
- Výbor z mladší a starší literatury staroegyptské
- Náboženská literatura staroegyptská
- Staroegyptské čarodějnictví
- Obecné mravní nauky staroegyptské
- Grammaire démotique
- Veřejný život ve starém Egyptě
