= Convent of Saint Agnes (Prague) =

13th-century convent in Prague

Coordinates: 50.0925°N 14.4249°E

The convent of Saint Agnes (Czech: Anežský klášter) is situated on the right bank of Vltava, in Prague Old Town area called „Na Františku“. The monastery of Poor Clares of the Order of Saint Clare and Franciscans was founded in 1231 by Agnes of Bohemia, who also became the abbess of the convent.

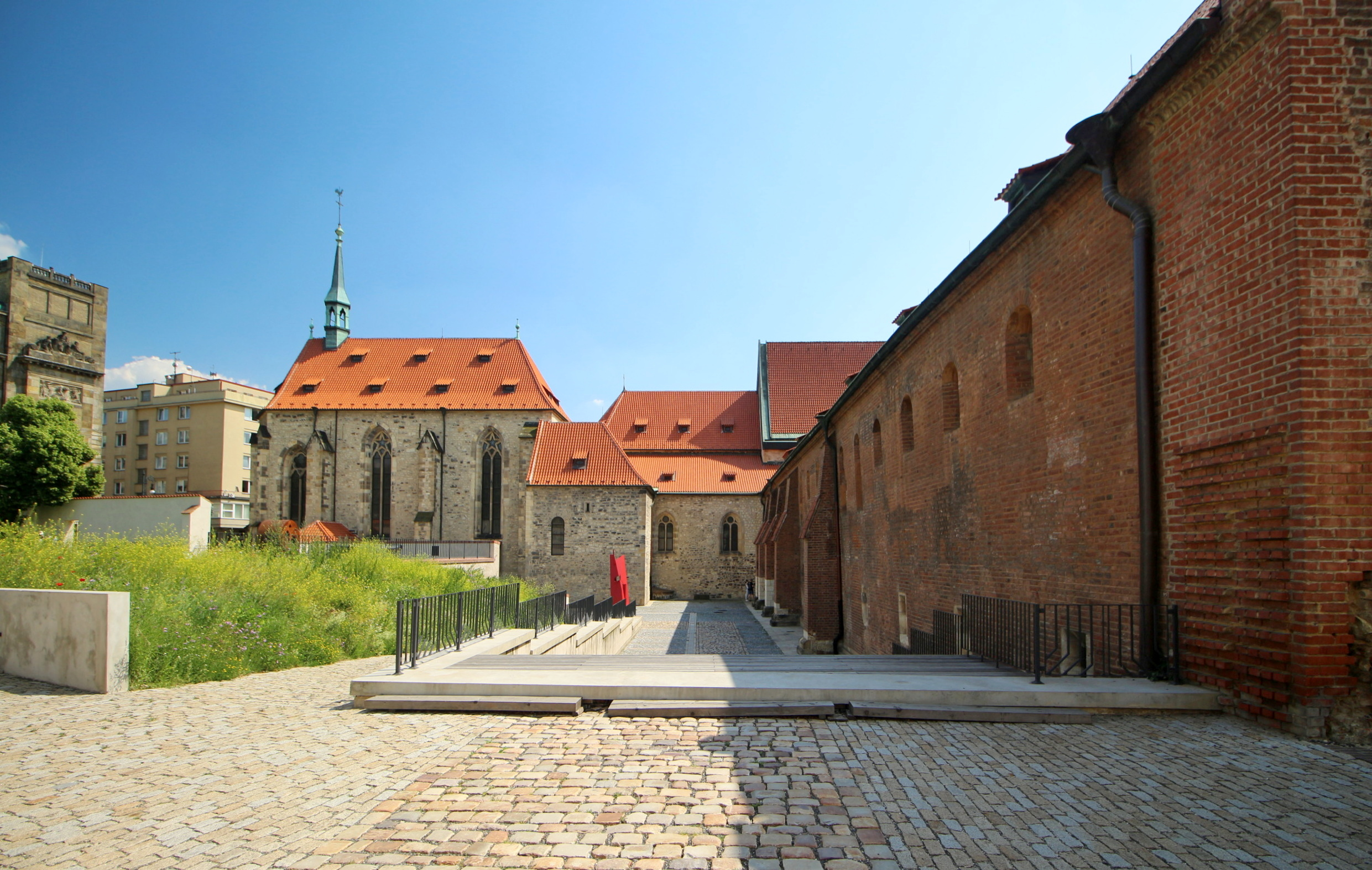
The convent, a view from the river bank

== History ==
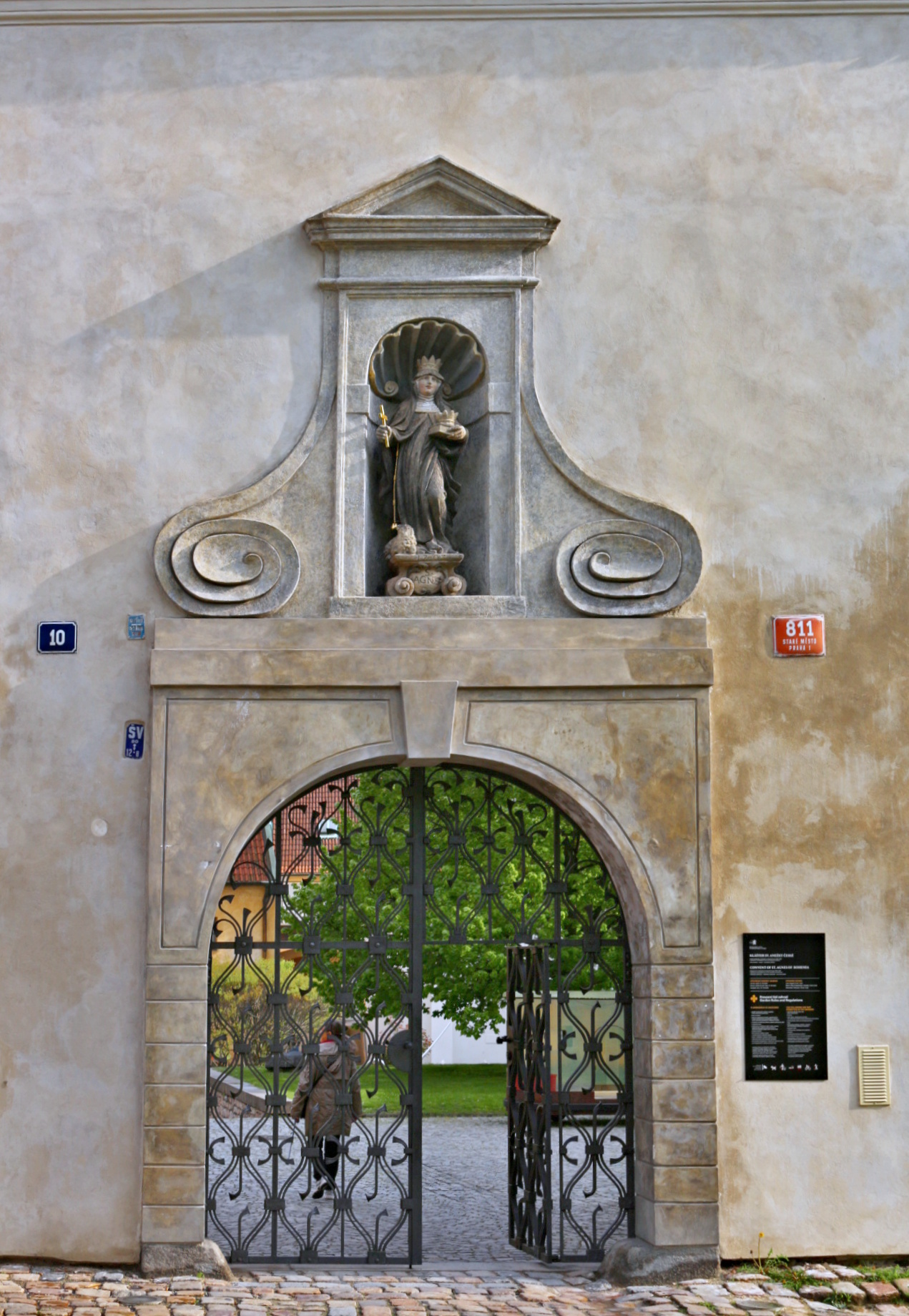
The northern gate

Agnes of Bohemia was the youngest daughter of King Ottokar I of Bohemia and was raised in a convent in Trzebnica and Doksany. This certainly had an influence on her later decision to become a nun and on her desire for education. While she was living with the Babenbergs in Vienna after being engaged to Henry VII of Germany, the son of the German emperor, she became familiar with early Gothic architecture. For six years she was living in the convent in Klosterneuburg, but after their engagement was cancelled, Agnes moved back to Prague. After her return, Anges was again under the influence of her father’s marriage policy and she got a marriage offer from Frederick II, Holy Roman Emperor. However, after her father’s death, Agnes used her newly gained freedom of choice and decided to establish a convent. Agnes was supported by the Pope and her family and via her convent she engaged Bohemia into the latest cleric and cultural flow.

=== The Order of Friars Minor and Clarisses ===
Due to the boom in the growth of cities in the Middle and Western Europe in the 12th and 13th century, the need of care for believers increased and Francis of Assisi founded the Order of Friars Minor, which was based on ethical resurgence and life without material provision, with emphasis on preaching and missionary activity. The female offshoot of the order was established by Saint Clare of Assisi. She followed the Franciscan tradition and Poor Clares, as were her followers called, dedicated themselves to care for ill people. The Order of Francis of Assisi then spread across Europe and originally plebeian order penetrated even the upper ranks. The first royal supporter of the order was Elizabeth of Hungary who, as well as Agnes, later renounced her social status. The religious and tectonic rules were the main subject of a discussion with the Roman Curia.

=== First construction period ===
The exact year when the convent was founded is not known, however it was presumably in 1231, after the negotiations about Agnes‘ marriage were completed. Agnes‘ brother, king Wenceslaus I of Bohemia donated the ground on the bank of Vltava river, which was very convenient for a hospital. Simultaneously, Wenceslaus licensed the convent with many privileges. One of the oldest parts of the convent of St. Agnes was the main sacred area, the church of St. Francis, which was built without presbytery at first. Along with the church, a spacious east wing of the convent was built. The construction was rather quick and in 1234, the convent was consecrated. In 1237, the convent was given many significant privileges by Pope Gregory IX.

=== The second construction period ===
The male section was built during the second period - a monastery and a chapel of Saint Barbara connected with an aisle of the church of St. Francis. A residential building was built up to the presbytery, however, it was later rebuilt to the chapel of Virgin Mary. Agnes’ private chapel and her suite in the upper floor were located northward. Concurrently the cloister of Poor Clares was created, smaller compared to the original plan. In the 1250s a kitchen was attached. In the newly built presbytery of St. Francis, different Mason’s marks were found, which proves that other stonemasons came to Prague during the second period.

=== The third construction period ===
Agnes started a construction of a mausoleum after her brother’s death in 1253, and her nephew Ottokar II of Bohemia was crowned a Bohemian King in 1261. Ottokar II aspired to become an Emperor, which was reflected symbolically in his buildings. A central nave with two vault bays of rib vault has a pentagonal end. Capitals of supports placed in different heights reflect the latest tectonic fashion in Western Europe. Lastly, a triumphal arc connecting the nave and the chapel of Virgin Mary was built. The chapel became (like in the case of Parisian Sainte Chapelle) a repository for the most significant relics of the Bohemian Kingdom.

=== After Agnes’ death ===
In 1277, Agnes accepted Kunigunde of Bohemia, daughter of Ottokar II of Bohemia, into the convent. Due to the time of famine and anarchy after Ottokar’s death, during reign of King Wenceslaus II, Agnes passed her experiences on Kunigunde. Agnes died in 1282 and although she was treated like a saint for her whole life, she was not canonized until many centuries later, in 1989. Kunigunde then became the new abbess of the convent. However, her brother Wenceslaus II of Bohemia espoused her to Poland later on. After Agnes’ death, the convent was not in the main focus of the royal family anymore; Wenceslaus established a Cistercian monastery in Zbraslav, a new royal necropolis. With the death of Wenceslaus II and then Wenceslaus III of Bohemia, the glorious times of the Convent of St. Agnes ended.

=== The 14th century ===
In the 14th century, the convent was out of the main focus of politics and fine arts. The Poor Clares in the convent were usually the daughters of the greatest kins; however, the convent was gradually dying out. Later on with Charles IV reign and a boom of the city and construction industry, both parts of the convent were re-built. The dormitory was newly vaulted, the original windows were lowered and new trefoils were placed. A wooden platform in the nave of St. Francis was replaced with a stoney one and a portal on the western facade was made. One of the best-made details is a tall portal on the southern wall of the presbytery with a full tympanon, where original red and blue polychromy is very well preserved. The chapel of St. Salvator was also newly decorated, whereas the rest of sacral areas was not renovated. The highlight of the reconstruction was re-building the chapel of St Barbara, primarily a sepulchre for Poor Clares, to a larger chapel for the Minors. The chapel became rectangular with columns in the axis and a stellar vault.

=== During and after the Hussite wars ===
The convent was used as an armory and a mint during the Hussite Wars. With the House of Habsburg on the throne, Dominicans came to the female section of the convent and sold out the male one, so that this part of the town developed. In the 17th century, the convent was returned to Franciscans and clarisses from Panenský Týnec were moved to the convent, while it was deteriorating due to bad economic circumstances. After 1611, the church of St Francis was used as a cemetery. The convent was sold in 1782, during the reign of Josef II, as he was dissolving many churches and monasteries. The new owners changed it into small flats for the poor, workshops, and storages. In the late 19th century several plans for renovation (for example by J. Mocker, A. Cechner or J. Koula) of the convent appeared. The renewal started at the turn of the 20th century and lasted until 1914. After World War II, archaeological and historical research was led by Oldrich Stefan and I. Borkovsky .

=== Present day ===
The National Gallery became the owner of the Convent of St. Agnes in 1963 and the final phase of renovation followed. Since 1978, the convent is a national cultural heritage landmark and a gallery. Initially, Bohemian art of 19th and early 20th century was exhibited but today, a permanent exhibition of Medieval Arts of Bohemia and Central Europe is displayed. The cloister is used for temporary exhibitions.

== Description ==
The architecture of the convent is influenced by two main factors. Firstly, the foundress of the convent was a royal daughter; therefore she had sufficient financial means and political influence available. Secondly, Agnes was raised in convents, so she knew this lifestyle very well and knew the connections with everyday usage of the buildings. Hence, a generously large convent was built. It was based on an existing structure of the Old Town during a cultural and economic boom, a rise of the Bohemian state and the beginning of the gothic culture in Central Europe. The setup of the buildings shows the influence of Burgundian Cistercian architecture which was common in Central Europe mainly before the mid 13th century. Since the tectonic rules of Franciscan architecture were not accurately defined at that time, mixing of romance and gothic elements is noticeable during first construction period, especially in the church of St Francis

=== Disposition ===
On the first floor there is an entrance to the permanent exhibition of National Gallery on the left and on the right there is a way in to the cloister, where other parts of the convent are accessible from. That includes the kitchen, opposite to that there are refectory, chapter house and the stairway to the dormitory. There is also a doorway to the chapel of Virgin Mary and other sacral areas. Across from the entrance there is a sepulchre, church of St. Salvator, on the right (southern) side the presbytery of the church of st. Francis and on the left side, there is Agnes’ private oratory. Only the torso of the St. Francis’ church nave came down to the present day and was re-built later on. Also nothing more than the fundaments of the buildings of the male part of the convent with a cloister endured.

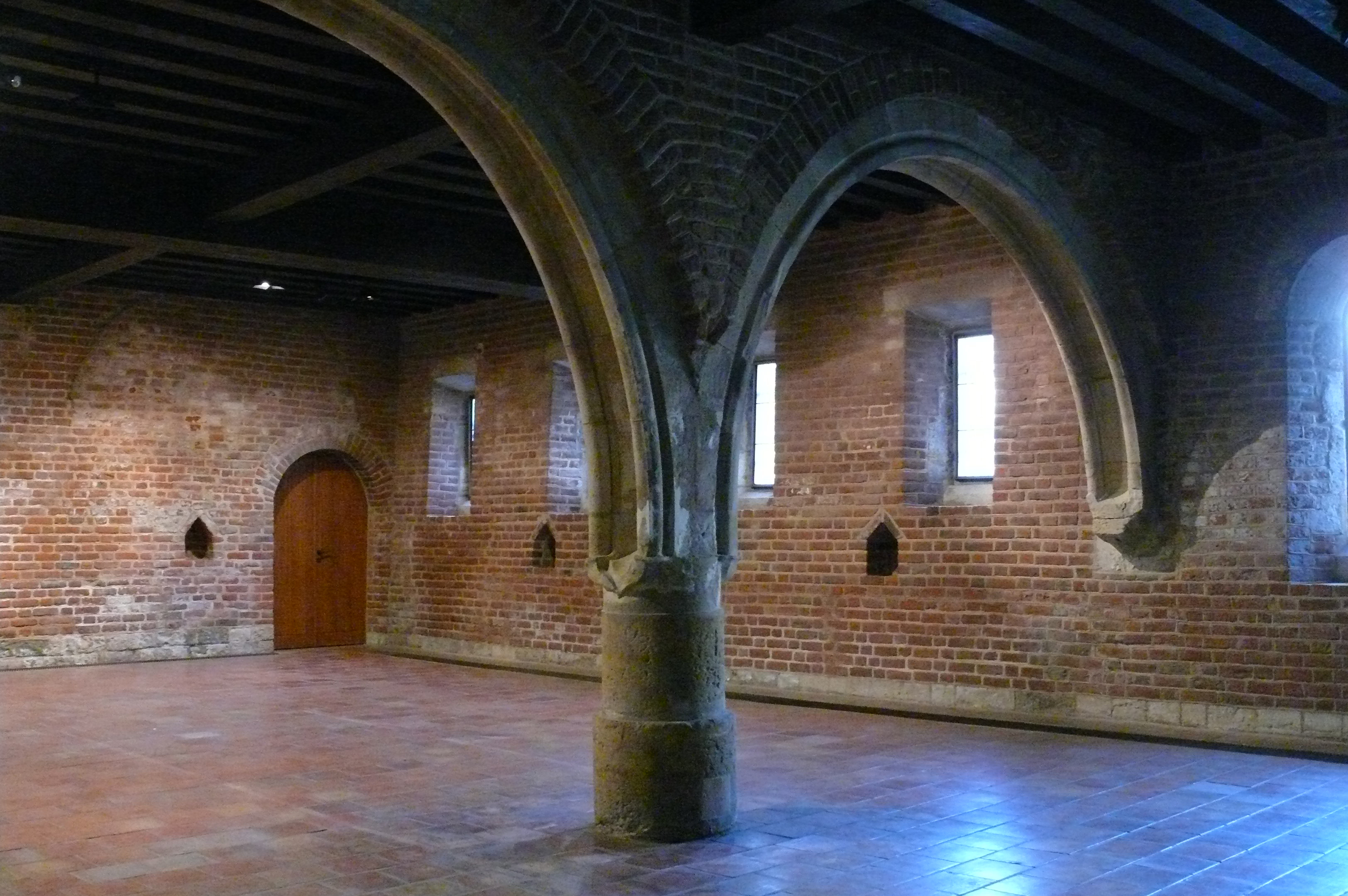
The refectory

=== The Church of Saint Francis ===
Only the torso is left to the present day. Originally, the church was asymmetrical with two naves and three vault bays in each of the naves. Adjacent to the nave was a southern aisle and northward was the convent building. This disposition was by all accounts very convenient: the Poor Clares could easily go to the platform straightaway from the dormitory. According to the regulations, Poor Clares could not meet the public at any time, thus a special area, where they could listen to the mass separated and undisturbed, was needed. As a proof to the platform, there is a portal in the northern wall and a large window to the presbytery, located in the area of the triumphal arch.

=== Convent buildings ===
Unlike the church, the convent is built from bricks. The hallway connects a cloister with a garden or a hospital. To the northern wall of the hallway a chapter house, main staircase to the dormitory and refectory with scriptorium adjoin. There was also an original kitchen, storages and toilets. On the upper floor, there was a dormitory through its whole length. Part of it was probably used as a hospital. Chapter house, the main representative room, has a square floorplan and a flat wooden ceiling. It opens to the cloister with three windows and a trilobite portal which symbolizes the Trinity. A monumental hall next to the staircase was used as a refectory and scriptorium, so it has two parts. It was divided with semicircular transversal bands supported with a column into two squared sections with a portal in each of them. The proof for different functions could be altered windows’ shape or cross section of arcs in the middle of the room. There was a semicircular portal to the northern part of the convent by the northern wall of the refectory and a spiral staircase to the dormitory in the corner of the room. Originally there was a hospital with a small chapel in the eastern section was a part of the convent.

=== Presbytery of the Church of Saint Francis and Friars Minor’s Convent ===
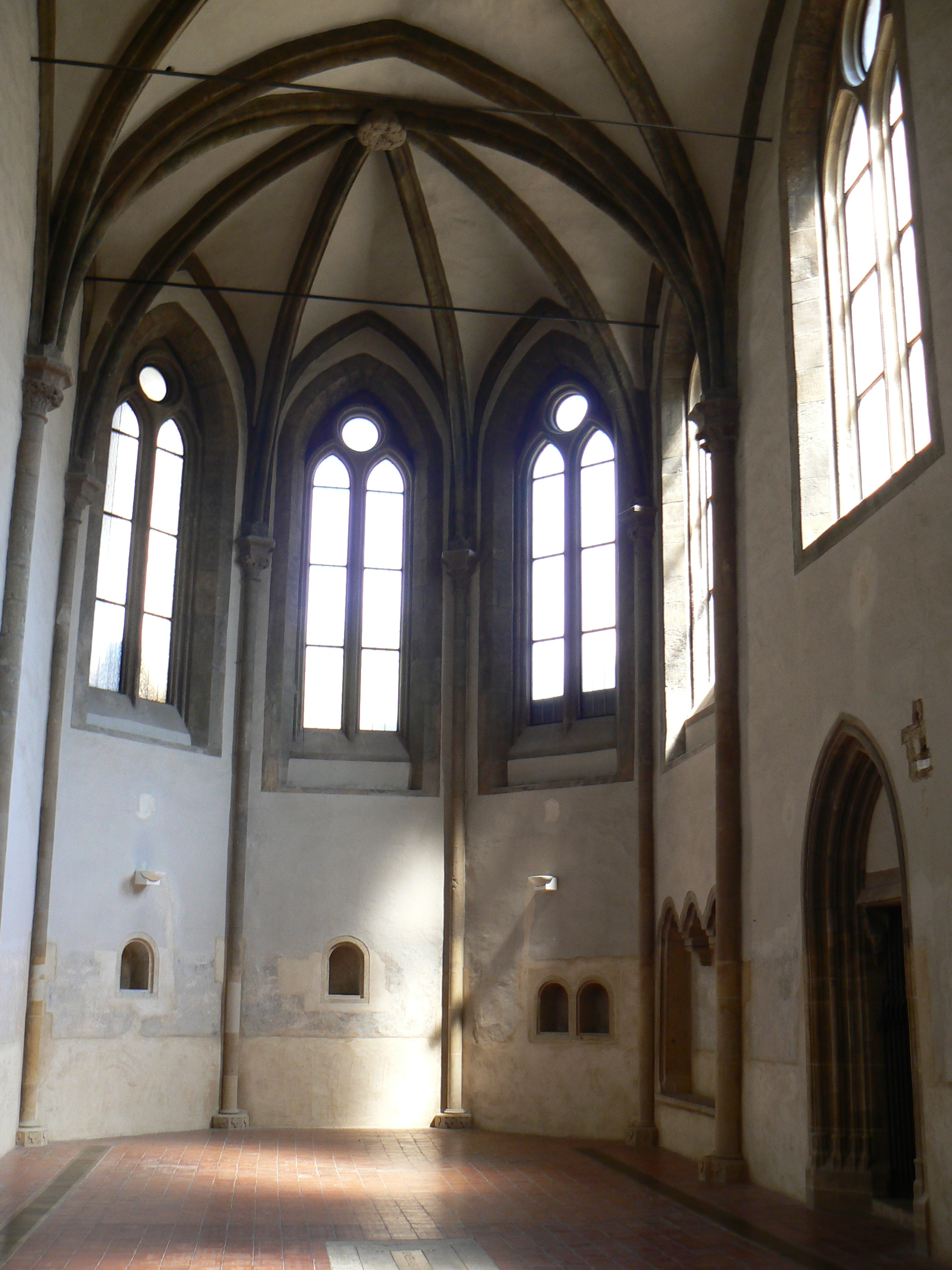
Presbytery of the church of Saint Francis

To the east section of the nave, an oblong presbytery with two vault bays and pentagonal end was added. According to the Order’s rules, it was open only to the Friars Minors, so it was connected to the male part of the convent with the southern wall, where an altar was placed. Different Mason’s marks are visible in the newly built presbytery of st Francis, which show a new stonemasonry coming to Prague during this period of construction. The vault bays were separated by round supports with capitals from which ribs with a pear cross section continued to a key stone with a floral decor. The room was lighted through large windows with a simple tracery and in the lower part of the end several alcoves could be found.

=== Chapel of Virgin Mary and Agnes’ suite ===
A multi-leveled building with three vault bays was connected to the northern wall of the presbytery; however, it was very soon rebuilt into the chapel of Virgin Mary. After that, Agnes’ private chapel and her bedroom in the upper floor were constructed. The rooms were connected with an indoor staircase from which an outer wall of the convent and a bridge to the convent were accessible. There was a chapel with a brick vault without ribs and an altar in the eastern area on the ground floor of Agnes’ dwelling. The upper floor, her bedroom, was decorated with a groin vault and wall paintings.

=== Poor Clares’ Cloister ===
The cloister of Poor Clares was built during the second construction period and in contrary to the initial plan it consists of six vault bays in each wing instead of eight.

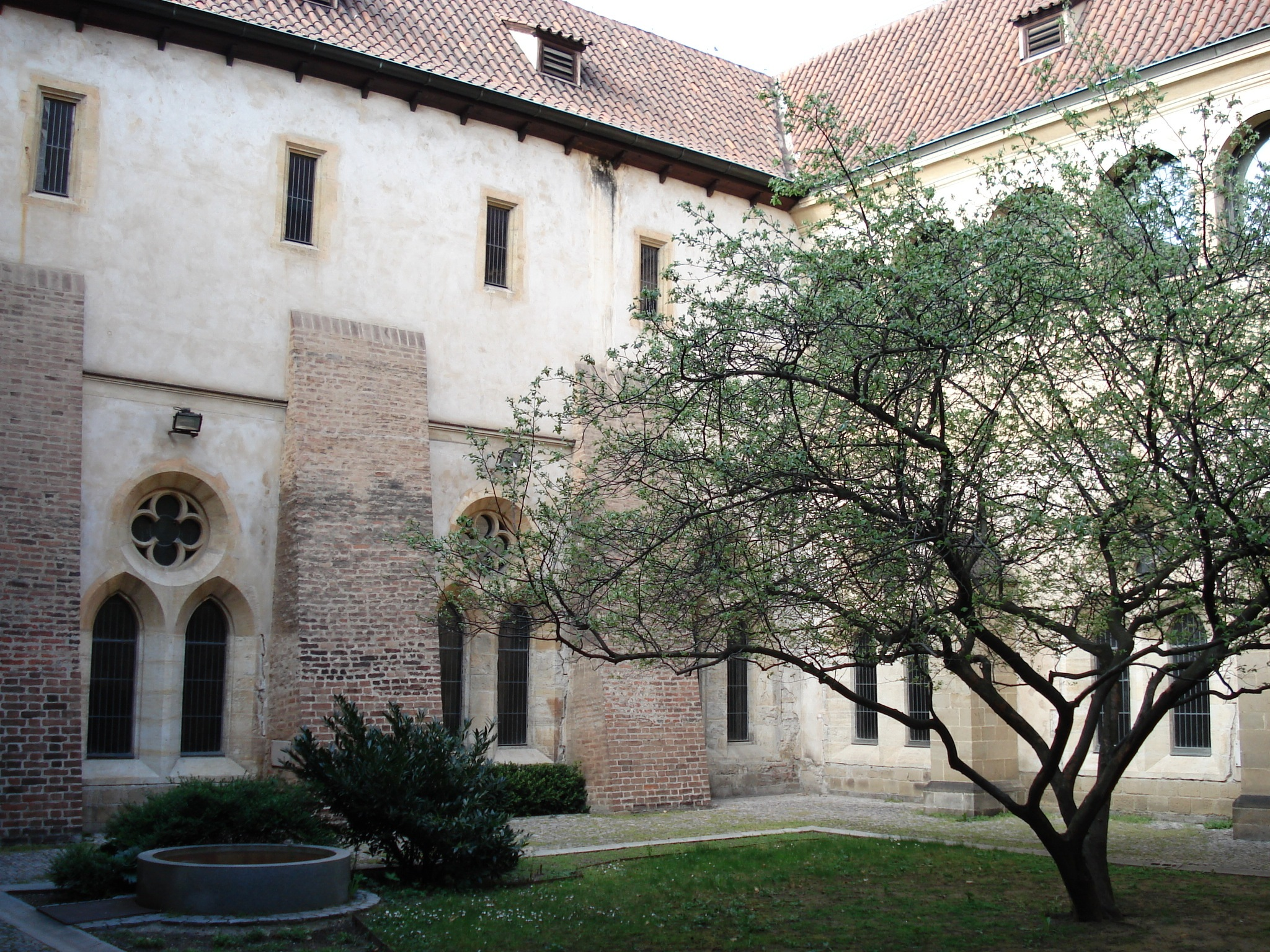
The cloister

=== Kitchen ===
The kitchen, based on a square floorplan with a vault and ribs connecting on a chimney at the top, was built in the 1350s.

=== Church of Saint Salvator (Saviour) ===
Přemyslid dynasty mausoleum has huge significance and its architectural quality is higher than in other parts of the convent. A nave with two bays of groin vault and a pentagonal end was done by an unknown French master. There was also a crypt within the mausoleum. It had pentagonal end, barrel vault and a staircase by the southern wall. The nave is connected with the chapel of Virgin Mary by a triumphal arch, which was built after the church was finished. Instead of capitals, heads of five Bohemian rulers and their wives are used. Agnes is portrayed on a capital just above the altar. The triumphal arch was constructed in the Golden section, using the 1:√2 ratio. Inner geometrical structure then defined significant places and was visible mainly on a 3D decor. For example, the heads instead of capitals are placed on the archivolt of the triumphal arch and also on the top of the Golden ratio square. The church being dedicated to Christ the Redeemer is an attempt of the Přemyslid dynasty to support the power of its own kin and a follow-up of Carolingian Renaissance. Likewise, a picture of the ruler is placed above the entrance opposite to the altar (in the same height as Jesus). In the middle of the end a place for the ruler’s gravestone is left. Few symbols of Christ’s resurrection could be found: five-pointed stars in traceries of windows in the end or lilies with five leaves under Agnes‘ portrait. The whole space is decorated with frescos of Christ’s life. These have, however, survived only in fragments.

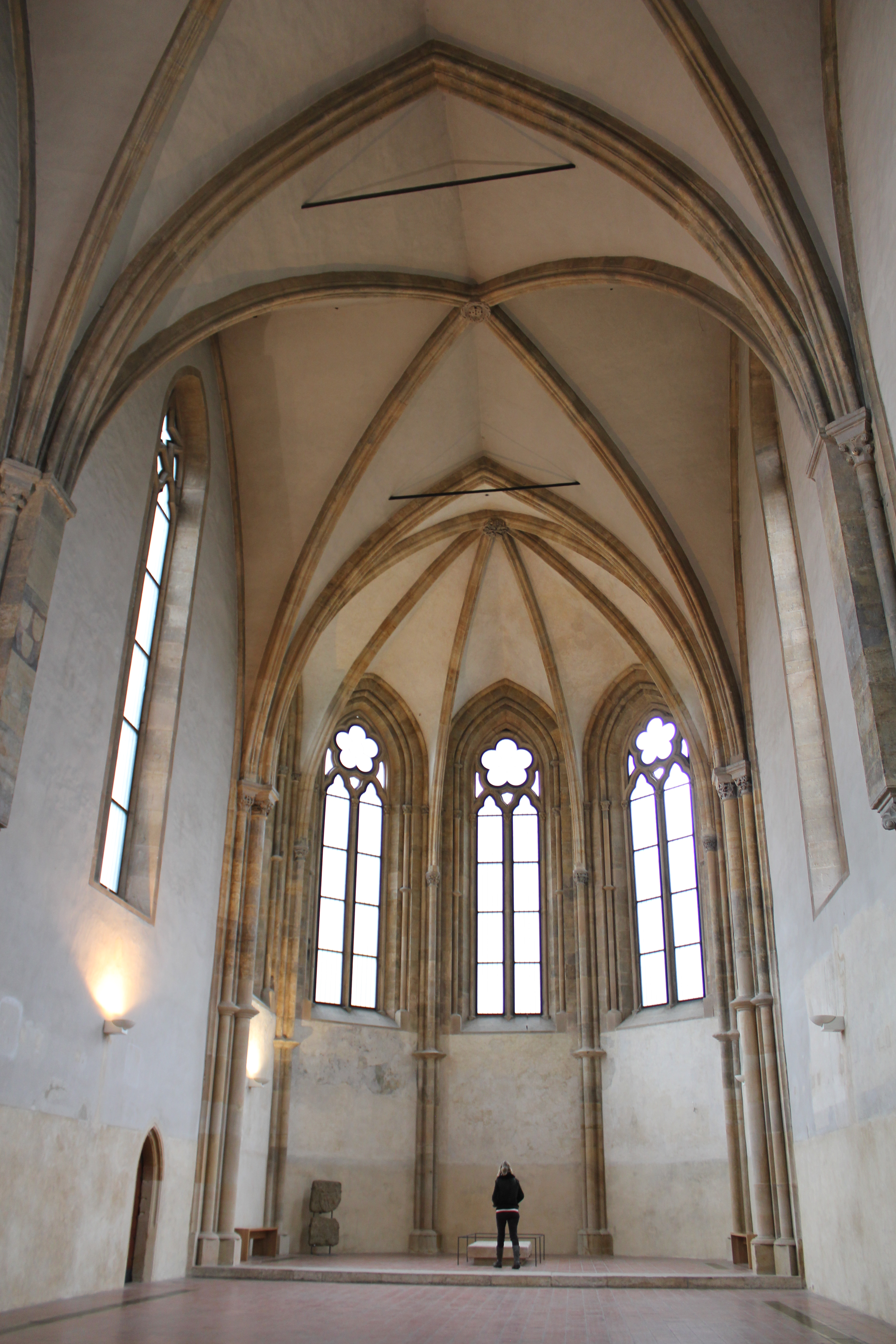
Presbytery of the Church of Saint Salvator

== Museum ==
There is a museum ″Medieval Art in Bohemia and Central Europe 1200–1550″ in the first floor which is part of the National Gallery Prague.

== Bibliography ==
- Soukupová, Helena. Anežský klášter v Praze (1. vydání ed.). Praha: Odeon, 1989.
