= Knights of the Cross with the Red Star =

European Catholic religious order

- Latin: Ordo militaris Crucigerorum cum rubea stella
- Maltese cross
- Abbreviation: O.Cr.
- Nickname: Military Order of the Crusaders of the Red Star
- Formation: 1233; 793 years ago
- Founder: Saint Agnes of Bohemia
- Founded at: Prague, Bohemia
- Type: Order of canons regular of pontifical right
- Headquarters: Generalate: Platnéřská 191/4, 110 00 Prague - Old Town
- Region served: Czech Republic, Austria
- Members: 18 (2021)
- Motto: Latin: Concordia res parvae crescunt. Discordia res maximae dilabuntur.
- Grand Master: Josef Šedivý
- Patron saints: Saint Agnes of Bohemia; Saint Augustine
- Ministry: Hospitaller and charitable activities; pastoral ministry
- Parent organization: Catholic Church
- Website: krizovnici.eu

The Knights of the Cross with the Red Star (Latin: Ordo Militaris Crucigerorum cum Rubea Stella, Crucigeri cum rubea stella, Crucigeri stellati, Stelliferi, Czech: Rytířský řád Křižovníků s červenou hvězdou, German: Kreuzherren mit dem Roten Stern, postnominal initials: O.Cr., O.Crucig.), also known as the Military Order of the Crusaders of the Red Star is a Catholic religious order present in the Czech Republic and Austria. It is the only religious order of papal right originating from Bohemia and the only male religious order in the world founded by a woman. The spirituality of the Order nowadays consists of two pillars: The first is the pastoral care in the former so-called incorporated parishes, the second is the hospitaller charisma given to the Order in its beginnings by its founder, St. Agnes of Bohemia.

The Order is currently a community of canons regular. The institute of lay brothers, which existed in the Order throughout history, ceased to exist during the 18th century. The superior general of the Order receives an abbatial benediction and uses the title of Grand Master and General. His seat is in the Prague Crusader Monastery at the Old Town foot of the Charles Bridge.

The Order has 18 members, as of 1 January 2021.

== History of the Order ==
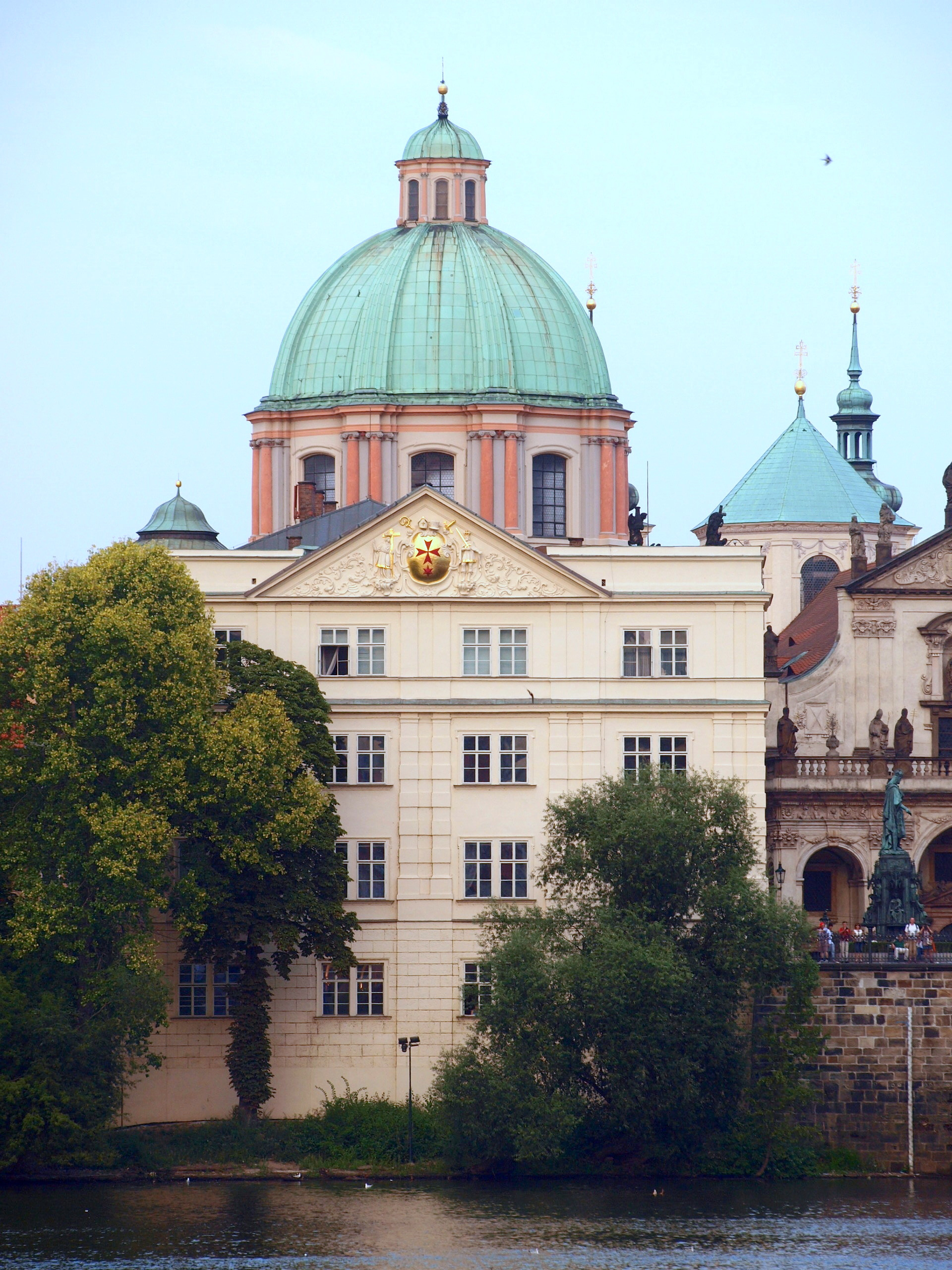
Dome of the Church of St. Francis of Assisi in Prague next to the Charles Bridge with the motherhouse of the Knights of the Cross with the Red Star

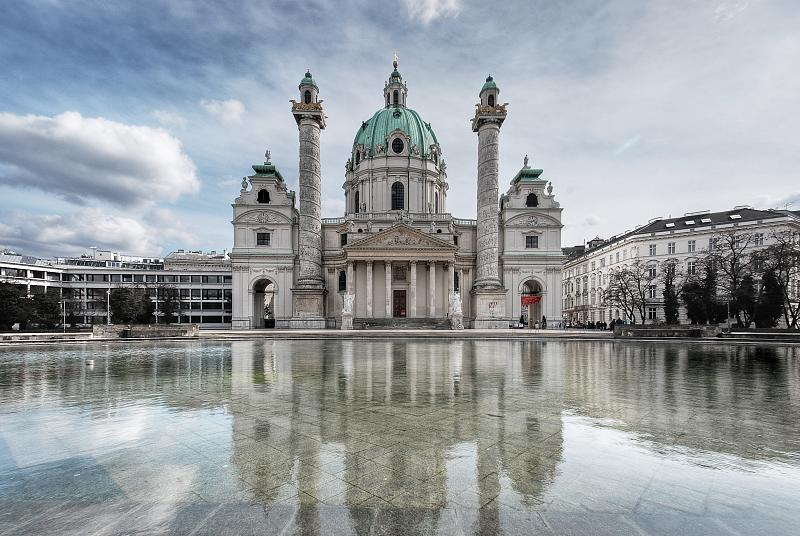
Karlskirche in Vienna in possession of the Knights of the Cross with the Red Star

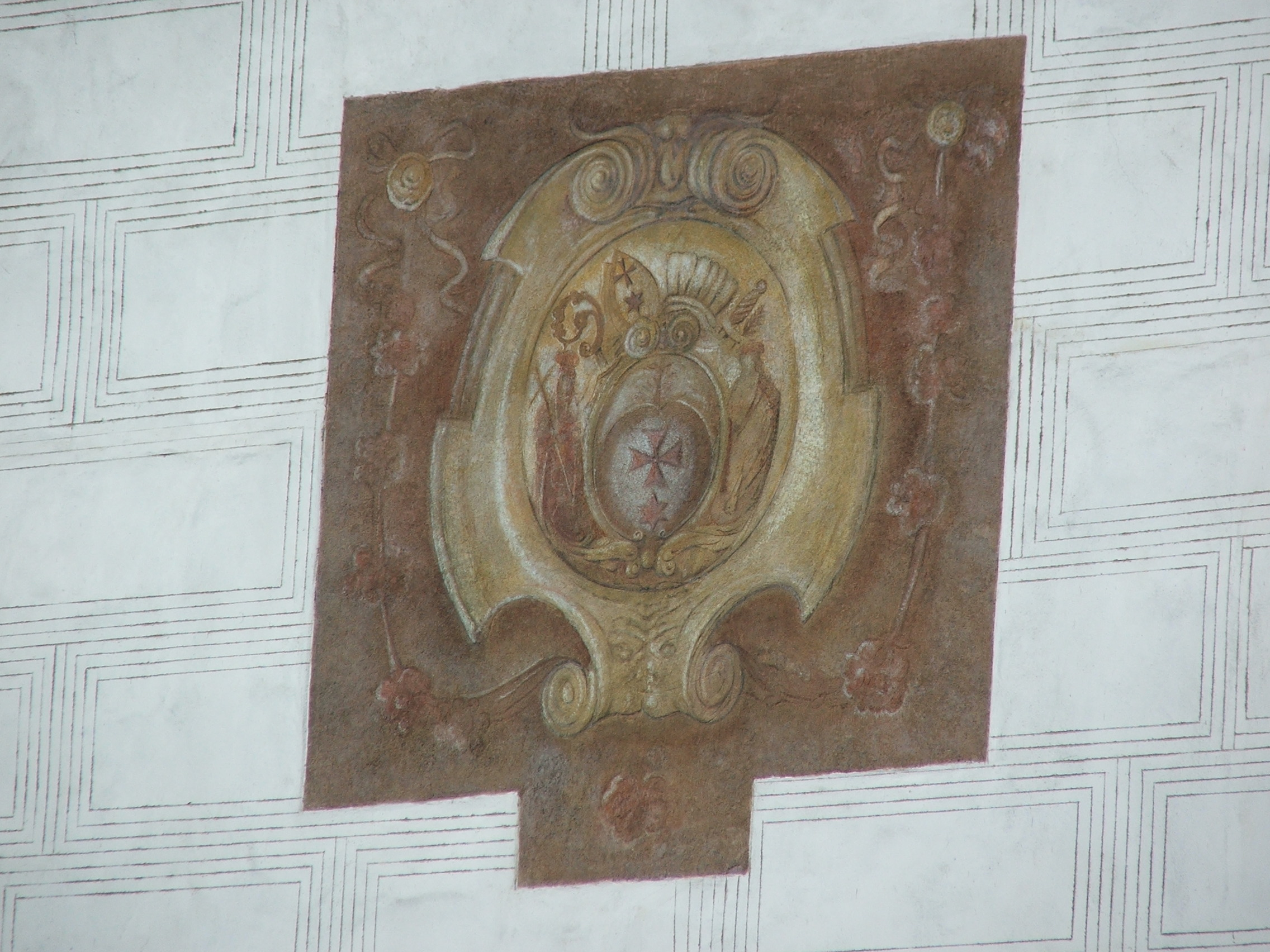
A fresco on the facade of Dobřichovice Castle showing the coat of arms of the Knights of the Cross with the Red Star

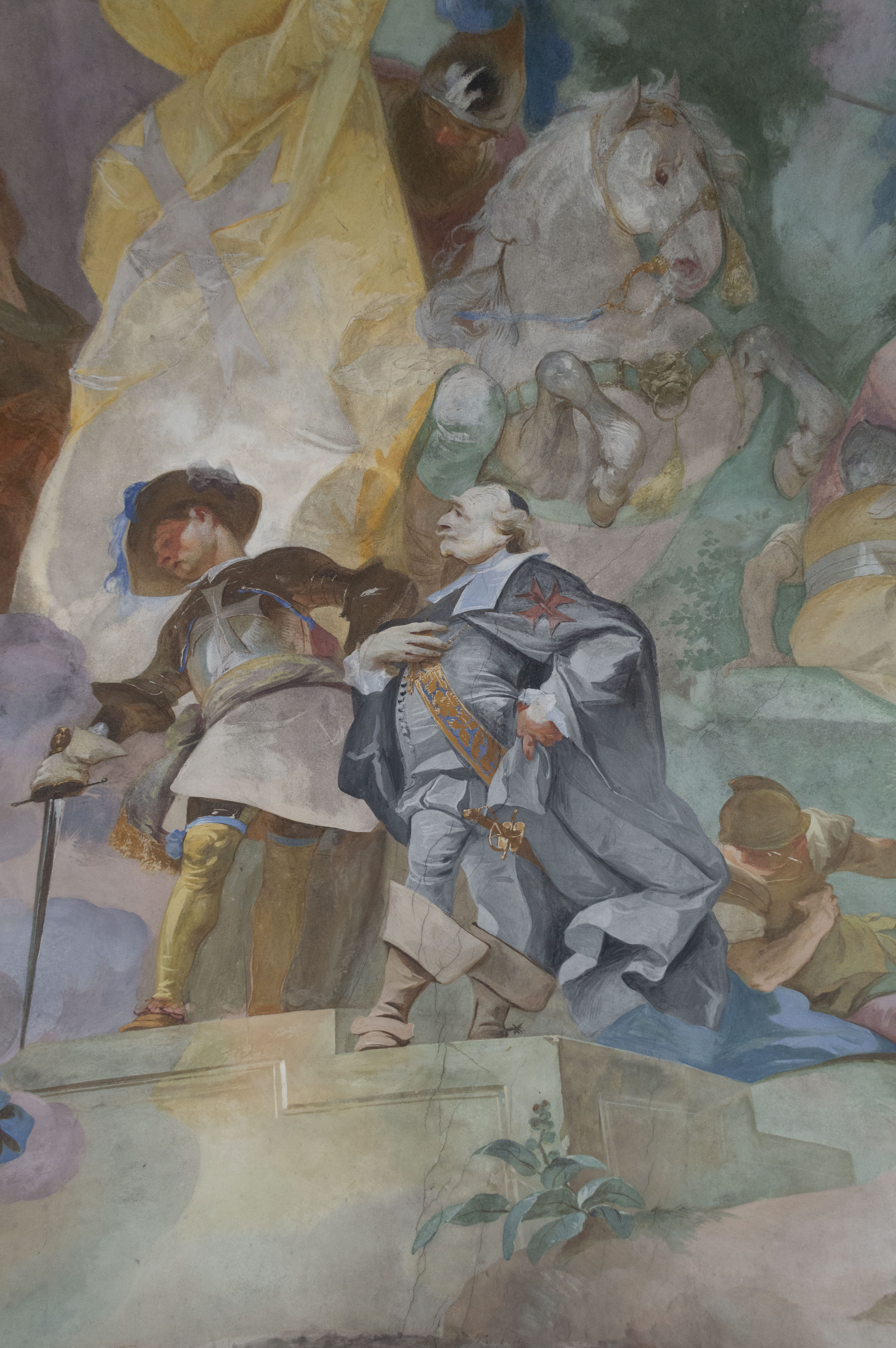
A fresco from the interior of the Church of Saint Hippolytus in Znojmo showing a knight of the Order

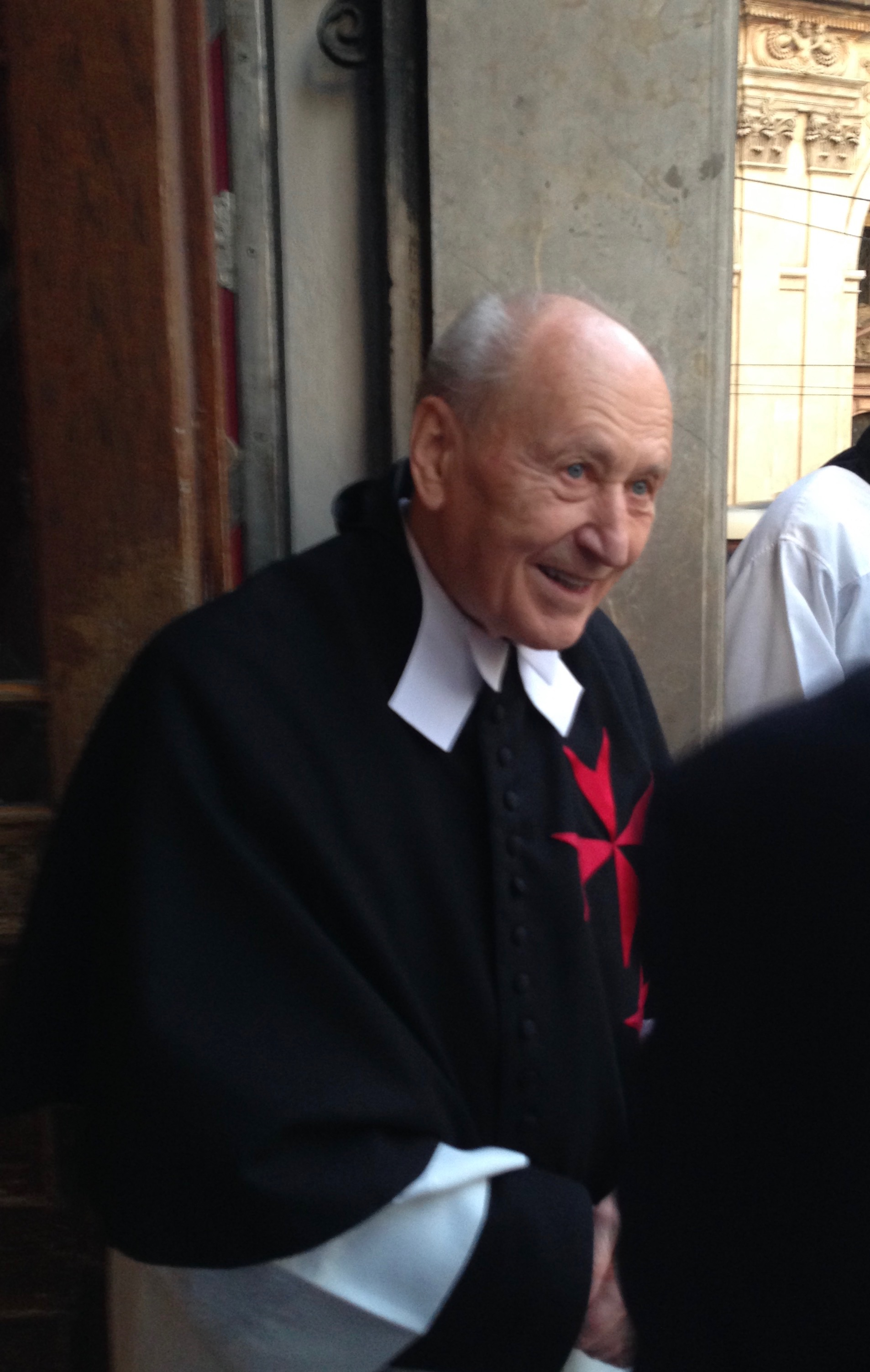
A priest of the Knights of the Cross with the Red Star in his choir dress

=== Medieval age ===
In 1233, St. Agnes of Bohemia founded a hospital fraternity of Franciscan tertiaries at her monastery in Prague. This community, inspired by the nursing military orders, was dedicated to the care of elderly, sick and other needy people. In 1235 the hospital was richly endowed by the Queen of Bohemia, Agnes's mother, with property formerly belonging to the Teutonic Knights. A few years later, in 1237 the Order had been formally constituted under the Rule of St. Augustine by Pope Gregory IX. Despite relatively clear origins of the Order, its beginnings used to be subject of legends, especially in the Baroque period: Traditionally its roots were traced back to Holy Land. Nevertheless, in a parchment Breviary of the Order, dated 1356, the account of foundation contains no allusion to such a crusader lineage. Many women were involved in the larger Franciscan movement such as Claire of Assisi who is mentioned later in this article but in Bohemia Agnes was the only woman to create an order of knights based in Franciscan Christianity which in this case makes her unique because no other woman has done this.

The Order moved to its present residence at the foot of the Prague Bridge in 1252, where its members not only took care of the hospital, but also became bridge keepers. The addendum "at the foot of the Prague Bridge" was attached to its name. The Order eventually spread its activities into other places in the Czech lands (České Budějovice, Cheb, Litoměřice, Stříbro, Znojmo-Hradiště, etc.). Thanks to Agnes's sister, Princess Anna, the Order expanded even to Silesian capital Wrocław. Members of the Order used to wear arms, a custom which was confirmed in 1292 by the Pope Nicholas IV. The Grand Master is still invested with a sword. The Order has been later on recognized as a military order by popes Clement X and Innocent XII.

During the Hussite Wars in the 15th century, the mission of many order hospitals was interrupted and some of order houses (commanderies) completely disappeared. At critical moments, the residence of the Grand Master was also temporarily moved to Cheb. However, the Prague hospital continued to serve and survived the turbulent period throughout the wars. After the end of the revolutionary years, there was a certain transformation of the role of the order clergy: Due to the shortage of Catholic secular priests, the members of the Order began to be appointed as parish priests. Yet the Order never gave up hospitality and this charisma has persisted in various forms to the present day. Orders of knights and knights are very prominent institutions that spanned all over Europe during the Middle Ages.

Historiography

There is little information available on the knights as the historiography is limited on eastern Europe. One of the only books that features a good amount of historiography on the Knights of the Cross of the Red Star is titled Blessed Gérard and his “Everlasting Brotherhood”: The Hospitaller Order of Saint John of Jerusalem Its foundation and spiritual roots by author Gérard Lagleder. This book focuses on different orders of knights and features information on the knights such as when they were founded and by who and where they were located. Many historians ignore the entirety of Eastern Europe and typically only mention the Teutonic knights and hosptilar knights. One other that tries to move away from this is Florin Curta in his book titled Eastern Europe in the Middle Ages (500-1300). In this book he mentions other orders of knights in Eastern Europe such as the knights of Christ and the Knights Dobrzyn orders. While historiography on this order is limited, there is a large amount of information available on the founder of the Knights of The Cross of the Red Star Agnes of Bohemia. Much of this information can be found from letters that were written between her and Clare of Assi who was a kind of mentor to Agnes of Bohemia. Thes letters have been translated by author Joan Mueller in her book titled Clare of Assisi: The Letters to Agnes. In this book she translates letters written between Clare of Assisi and Agnes of Bohemia, the founder of the knights. These letters do not directly mention a great deal of information about the knights, but they do talk about Agnes’s movement to Franciscan Christianity which is why knights focused on the helping of the poor. In the first letter that was translated from 1234 Clare of Assisi congratulates her on turning down her marriage proposal from Fredrick the 2nd and instead choosing to become a nun. Later Anges writes to Clare of Assisi again because she was seeking advice about what to do with her monastery because the pope would grant her the privilege of poverty. The pope would not grant her this privilege because at first he was worried that accepting a church founded by a woman with no guarantee of revenue would be bad for the church of Rome. But however, in 1237 this privilege of poverty would be granted to Agnes and her monastery with the help of Clare of Assisi. The Knights of the Cross of the Red Star reflect the growing Franciscan movement in Europe during the 1200s and it shows that this movement was becoming increasingly more popular in Europe due to it now reaching all the way to Eastern Europe in Bohemia as shown by Agnes and her church founded on these ideals. It also shows that while there is lacking historiography on eastern Europe the Pope and the church were heavily involved with expanding there reach all the way to Bohemia. This can be seen in the Pope’s willingness to grant Agnes rights to her monastery was well as the letters between the two of them.

Importance of the Order

As mentioned earlier, there is limited histography available on Saint Agnes of Bohemia and her order of the Knights of the cross of the Red Star. This is a very unique order as it is the only order of knights to be founded by a woman, and it was a Franciscan order which at this time was not very common in bohemia as the Franciscan movement was slowly beginning to spread to Eastern Europe. The book titled History of the Franciscan Movement Volume 1: from beginnings of the order to the year 1517 mentions multiple women during the movement such as Saint Clare who during her time was somewhat of a mentor to Agnes as the wrote letters back and forth to each other. While many women did help with the Franciscan movement Agnes and her order remain unique in that she was the only woman to have founded an order of knights and also that she was a key woman for movement in Eastern Europe.

=== Early modern period ===
Thanks to several capable Grand Masters, the Order entered the early modern period in quite good condition. In 1562 the Grand Master Antonín Brus of Mohelnice even became Archbishop of Prague. This appointment marks the end of a long period of sede vacante of the St. Adalbert's See. Since then, archbishops of Prague had held the post of Grand Master for almost a hundred and fifty years. The Order thus gained a prestigious role, yet at the same time it was obliged to economically support the impoverished Prague Diocese and to finance its development.

Of this long period, the last two Grand Master on the St. Adalbert's See, Arnost Vojtěch of Harrach and Jan Bedřich of Waldstein, are worth mentioning. Arnost Vojtěch of Harrach became the head of the Order in 1623 and was appointed Cardinal by Pope Urban VIII in 1626. He died in 1667, making him the longest serving Grand Master of the Order. After his death, Jan Bedřich of Waldstein became a new Grand Master, building on the work of his predecessor. He continued the reconstruction of the monastery at Charles Bridge, which he completed with the construction of a new church designed by the architect J. B. Mathey. In 1692, Jan Bedřich of Wallenstein, with the help of his later successor and then Prior of the Order, Jiří Ignác Pospíchal, completed the building of St. Agnes Hospital, which stood on the site of today's Slavia Café at the corner of Národní třída in Prague.

The Order flourished also in the first half of the 18th century. Grand Master John Francis Franchimont of Frankenfeld was granted by Pope Clement XI the right to use mitre and other pontifical insignia (crosier, pectoral cross, ring) for himself and his successors. This right was later given also to the provost at the monastery of St. Hippolytus in Hradiště near Znojmo. (After the reforms related to the Second Vatican Council, only the Grand Master of the Order has this privilege.) During the 18th century the Order spread its activities to various places outside the Lands of the Bohemian Crown. In 1723 it was installed at the hospital of St. Martin and Leopold in Bratislava, in 1733 at the Karlskirche in Vienna. In 1770 Maria Theresa invested the Order with the administration of the prominent parish at Buda Castle. During this period, the Order hired great artists of the Baroque era. Kilian Ignaz Dientzenhofer built the Church of St. Mary Magdalene in Karlovy Vary, while Johann Bernhard Fischer von Erlach built the Church of St. Charles Borromeo in Karlsplatz, Vienna. The painters Václav Vavřinec Reiner, Petr Brandl, Karel Škréta and Michael Willmann used to work for the Order.

=== 19th century ===
Even the last third of the 18th century was marked by significant changes in the life of the Order. Under the Josephine reforms, the hospitals in Prague (Písané lázně) and in Bratislava at St. Martin and Leopold were abolished. The trend towards the reduction of the role of the Order in health and social services was ongoing throughout the 19th century. The initiative of Grand Master Josef Antonín Köhler, who founded the first children's a nursery in Bohemia in Prague-Karlín, can be described as a certain substitute, or perhaps a new expression, of the Order's original charisma. Overall, though, the focus of the Order's work was shifted to pastoral care in parishes.

During this period the Order was forced to give up most of its foreign locations for political reasons (Bratislava 1786, Wrocław 1810, Budapest 1882). However, these losses were compensated, especially in the late 19th and early 20th century, by the expansion of activities even in new locations in the Czech lands (Karlovy Vary-Rybáře, Věteřov). From the history of the first half of the 19th century, we can also mention the fate of the Order's member Karl Anton Postl, who illicitly left the Order in 1823 during a spa stay in Karlovy Vary and his trace was thereafter lost. It was only after his death that his further life story came to light: After his desertion from the Order, Postl became a successful writer, publishing under the pseudonym Charles Sealsfield.

Perhaps the most remarkable moment in the history of the Order in the 19th century was 3 December 1874. On this day St. Agnes of Bohemia, the founder of the Order, was beatified by Pope Pius IX. An important milestone was thus passed on the way to her later canonization, i.e. declaration as a saint.

Even in the 19th century and especially at the beginning of the 20th century, the Order continued to carry out ambitious architectural projects. In addition to continual repairs and reconstruction of churches, parishes and estates, there are also larger construction projects. In the middle of the 19th century, the wing of the so-called Generalate of the Prague monastery was raised by one floor. At the very beginning of the 20th century, new churches and parishes were built in Karlovy Vary-Rybáře, Milhostov, Řevnice and Věteřov. All this culminates in the extensive reconstruction of the monastery near Charles Bridge, which was designed by the architect Josef Sakař and completed in 1912. Only the church, the Generalate and the late-gothic parts of the so-called Old Priory have been preserved. The other mostly early Baroque buildings were replaced by modern Art Nouveau – Neo-Baroque buildings. However, the efforts did not focus only on architecture. At this time, other important artists worked for the Order, particularly those from the so-called National Theatre Generation: Josef Václav Myslbek, František Ženíšek and Václav Brožík.

The economic aspect of the Order's life cannot be overlooked either, though it will require further historical research. However, we already know that the Order's brewery near Charles Bridge was the first one in the Czech lands to start bottling beer (1841).

=== 20th and 21st centuries ===
==== 1900–1945 ====
The first decade of the service of Grand Master František Xaver Marat was marked by extensive building development of the Order, which was crowned by the reconstruction of the monastery at Charles Bridge (1908-1912). The tasks that awaited his successor and the second longest serving Grand Master Josef Vlasák were of a completely different nature. He took office during the hard years of World War I, continued through the difficult period of the First Republic followed by the years of Nazi occupation, and died during the Stalinist period of the Communist regime.

During the World War I, the Grand Master had to deal with a severe shortage of food for both the monastery and its hospital. After 1918, in the turbulent atmosphere of the young Czechoslovak republic and in the anti-Catholic sentiment that resonated in Czech society, there were talks about the dissolution of monasteries. This suppression would have had fatal consequences for the Order operating at that time only in the Czech lands. In this context, the Grand Master was preparing the possible relocation of the entire Order to the United States. Fortunately for the Church, the situation eventually stabilized, and the Order was able to continue to serve in its traditional locations. Despite the economic difficulties caused by the Czechoslovak land reform and the Great Depression, the Order continued its social activities and generously financed the restoration of the Convent of Saint Agnes in Prague - Na Františku and constructions of new churches in Prague's suburbs.

After the Munich Agreement in 1938, when part of Czechoslovakia fell to Nazi Germany, a significant number of the Order's parishes (in western Bohemia) found themselves outside the Czechoslovak borders.

Due to the sudden situation and with regard to the spiritual needs of the faithful in the parishes administered by the Order, an agreement was signed between the Order and the Cistercian Abbey of Vyšší Brod. The aim of the agreement was mutual assistance in pastoral care: The Crusaders took over the administration of Cistercian parishes in territories with Czech-speaking population; reciprocally some Crusader parishes in territories ceded to Germany were administered by Cistercians of Vyšší Brod.

In 1941, just before the death of the Archbishop of Prague, Cardinal Karel Kašpar, the Grand Master of the Order was forced by the Nazis to move to Brno, where he found shelter in the Augustinian Abbey in Old Brno. A year later, in 1942, the Order was forced by the German occupiers to leave its convent near Charles Bridge. At the end of the war, the Order even had to give up the ministry at the main church of the Order, St. Francis at Charles Bridge. During the war, some of the Order members were persecuted by Nazis: Karel Weis and Ladislav Sirový were imprisoned in the Dachau concentration camp. The end of World War II in May 1945 enabled the revival of religious life in the monastery near Charles Bridge. Due to the forced transfer of the German population of Czechoslovakia, the German-speaking members of the Order left for Germany along with their parishioners in 1946.

==== 1948–1989 ====
As part of "Action K", the monastery was seized by the State Security (StB) on 27 April 1950. The Grand Master of the Order was destined to spend the rest of his life in the parish of St. Peter in Poříčí in respect of his advanced age. Other members of the Order were transported to concentration monasteries in Broumov, Králíky and Želiv. Certain members of the Order administering the Order´s parishes used to be persecuted and even imprisoned. A. Dragoun was convicted even twice: Firstly in 1951, then again in 1959. The longest sentence was imposed on J. Šebesta, a priest of the Order from the Parish Františkovy Lázně. He was sentenced to 17 years, part of which he would spend in a forced labour camp in the uranium ore mines in Jáchymov. The second longest sentence was imposed on B. Rákosník, priest of the Order from the Parish Kynšperk nad Ohří. He was sentenced to 13 years. Other members of the Order are then given less severe sentences. However, there were also members of the Order who, for various reasons, became involved with the totalitarian regime (Jan Mára, František Xaver Dítě). The vacant buildings of the monastery were first handed over to the Ministry of Health, then became one of the State Security (StB) headquarters. Nevertheless, the priests of the Order could still continue to serve at the main church of the Order – throughout the communist period there was always at least one Crusader priest at St. Francis. These priests of the Order who have not been withdrawn from “state approval” used to serve in various parishes. Member of the Order František Verner became the first librarian of the so-called Post-Conciliar Library (a library to help implement the reforms of the Second Vatican Council) founded by Archbishop of Prague František Tomášek. Since the death of Grand Master Josef Vlasák in December 1958, the office had been vacant until 1988. In 1988, at the time of the mitigation of the state's anti-church policy, Dr. Ladislav Sirový was elected the 46th Grand Master and General of the Order. He was installed in office by Cardinal František Tomášek in a private ceremony in the chapel of the Prague Archbishop's Palace.

12 November 1989 became an important milestone in the history of the Order when its founder, St. Agnes of Bohemia, was canonized in Rome by Pope John Paul II.

==== 1989 till the present ====
Emblem created for the event of the canonization of St. Agnes of Bohemia

After the Velvet Revolution in November 1989, the Order has returned to its monastery next to the Charles Bridge. The tragic event of 12 February 1992 marked the further course of the Order, The Grand Master Ladislav Sirový died after a serious car accident. Regarding the personal situation, the election of a new Grand Master was not proceeded with. Bishop František Lobkowicz OPraem temporarily took over the administration of the Order by the will of the Holy See. It was only in 2001 that Jiří Kopejsko, a long-time provost at the Order's pilgrimage site at Chlum Svaté Maří, became the 47th Grand Master of the Order. After his retirement in 2011, he was succeeded by the current 48th Grand Master Josef Šedivý, former parish priest of the Parish Věteřov near Kyjov, Doctor of Pharmacy by degree.

In 2015, a member of the Order, Jaroslav Ptáček, was honoured by Pope Francis. For his merits for the Order and especially for the Order's youth, he was awarded with the high papal decoration Pro Ecclesia et Pontifice.

Throughout the post-communist period, the Order has been striving to fulfil the charism of its saint founder: While Crusader priests still serve in former so-called incorporated parishes in the Czech Republic and Austria, the Order lives up to its original mission (patronage of the Girls Catholic High School, sponsorship of the Hospital of the Sisters of Mercy of St. Borromeo, foundation of the Crusader Nursing Service and the Crusader Home Hospice).

The Order can also be found in popular culture. The creators of the video game Kingdom Come: Deliverance II took inspiration from the medieval history of the Order in the Hermit quest.

== Churches of the Order ==
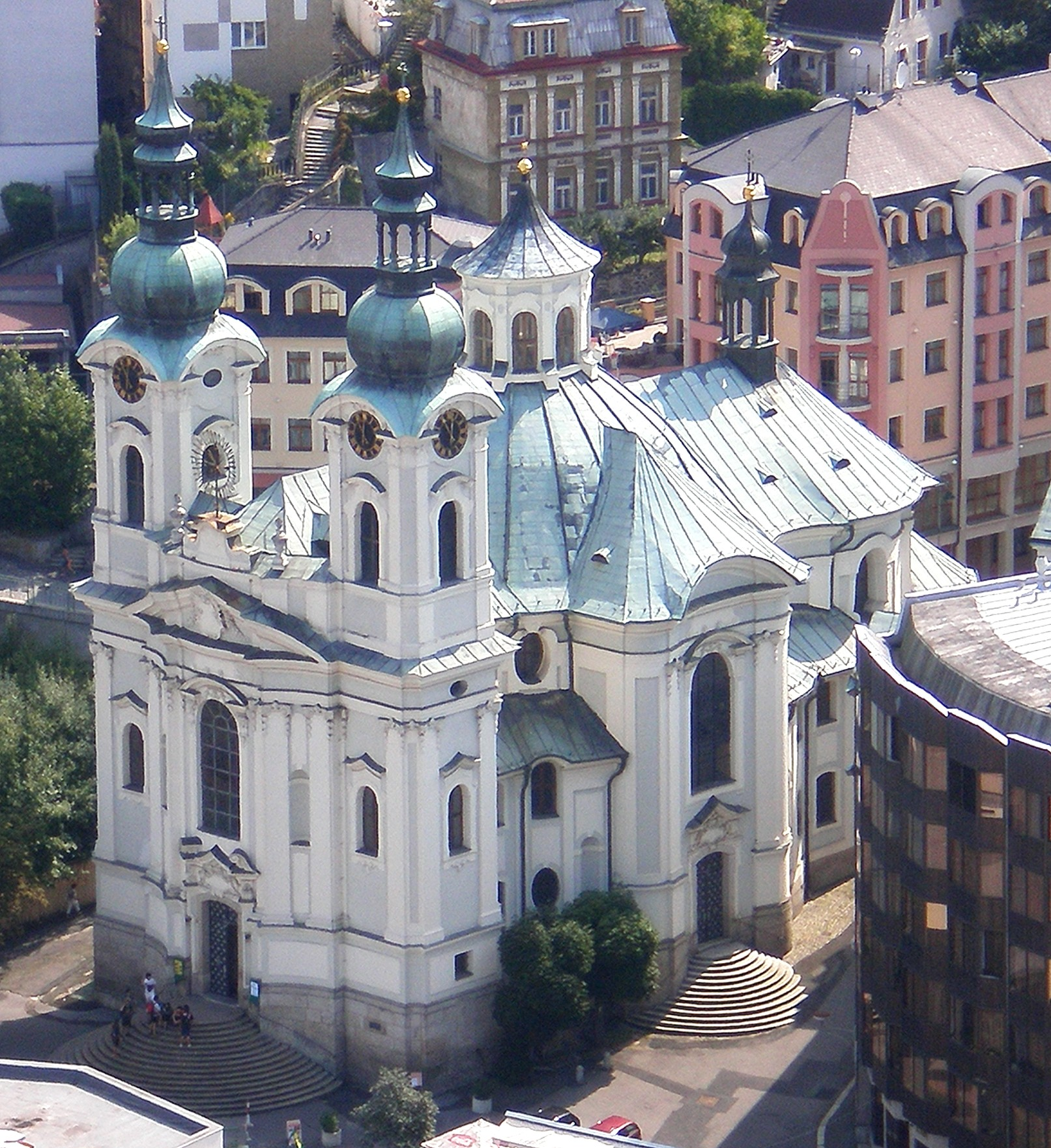
Church of Saint Mary Magdalene in Karlovy Vary

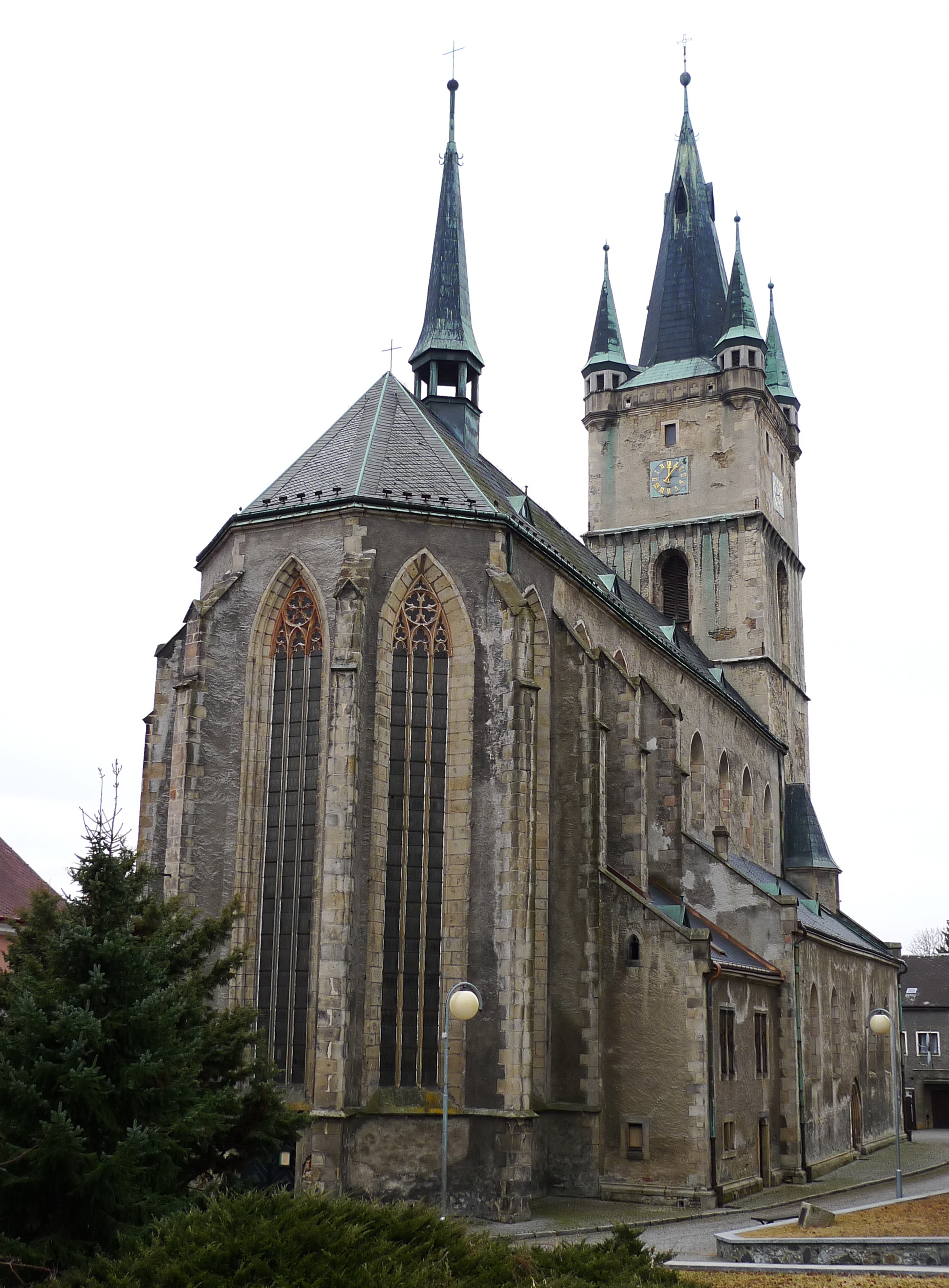
Church of the Assumption of the Virgin Mary in Tachov

- Church of the Assumption of the Virgin Mary (Borotice)
- Church of the Corpus Christi and the Virgin Mary (Český Krumlov)
- Church of Saint Bartholomew (Cheb)
- Church of the Assumption of the Virgin Mary and of Saint Mary Magdalene (Chlum Svaté Maří)
- Church of Saints Fabian and Sebastian (Chotilsko-Živohošť)
- Chapel of Saint Jude and Thaddeus (Dobřichovice)
- Church of the Exaltation of the Holy Cross (Františkovy Lázně)
- Church of Saint Mary Magdalene (Karlovy Vary)
- Church of Saint John the Baptist and Saint Anthony the Great (Klučenice)
- Church of the Assumption of the Virgin Mary (Kynšperk nad Ohří)
- Church of Saint Wenceslaus (Loket)
- Church of Saint John the Baptist (Mašovice)
- Church of Saint Nicholas (Milhostov)
- Church of Saint Francis of Assisi (Nový Knín)
- Church of Saint Sigismund (Popice)
- Chapel of the Holy Trinity and Saint Wenceslaus (Prague-Ďáblice)
- Church of Saint George (Prague-Hloubětín)
- Church of Saint Peter (Prague-New Town)
- Church of Saint Francis of Assisi (Prague-Old Town)
- Church of All Saints (Prague-Slivenec)
- Church of the Assumption of the Virgin Mary (Tachov)
- Church of Saint Martin (Tursko)
- Church of Saints Peter and Paul (Unhošť)
- Church of Saints Cyril and Methodius (Věteřov)
- Church of Saint Charles Borromeo (Vienna)
- Church of Saint Hippolytus (Znojmo)

== See also ==
- Puchner's Ark
