= Church of St. Peter at Poříčí (Prague) =

Roman Catholic church in the Czech Republic

Coordinates: 50°5′28.5″N 14°26′4″E

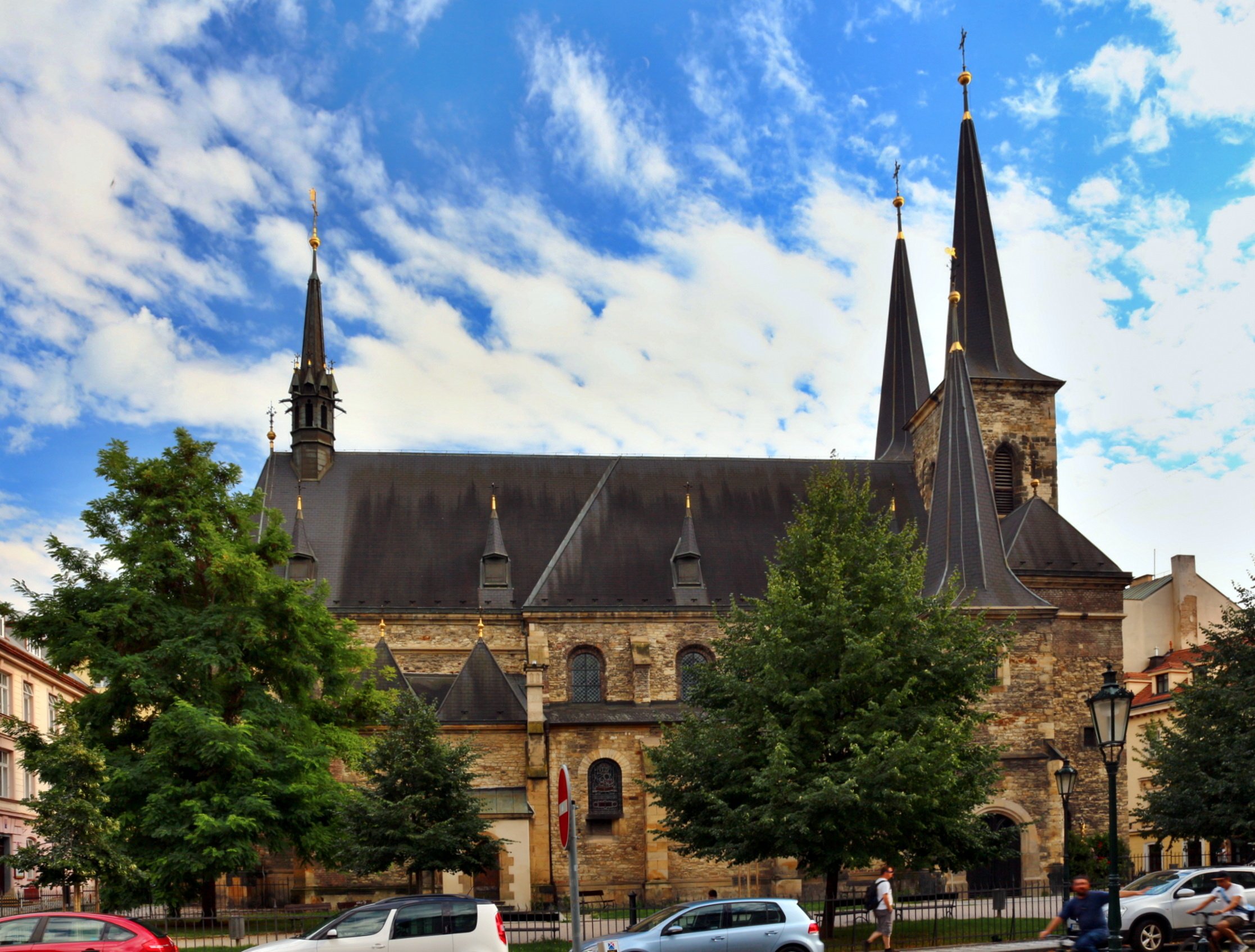
Church of St. Peter at Poříčí

Church of St. Peter on Poříčí (Czech: Kostel svatého Petra na Poříčí) is a Roman Catholic church in Prague, New Town, in Biskupská Street, it is dedicated to the Apostle Peter.

The church is administered by the religious order Knights of the Cross with the Red Star and the administrator is P. Lukáš Lipenský O.Cr.

== History ==
=== Romanesque Basilica ===
The basilica was built in the second half of the 12th century under the reign of King Vratislaus I. It was a parish church for the German community of the extinct village Poříčí.

==== Owners of the church ====
Around the year 1200, the Margrave of Moravian, Vladislav Henry, gave the church to the Teutonic order, which founded a hospital and also its residency there. After the death of a husband, Ottokar I of Bohemia, Constance of Hungary decided to establish a woman's Cistercian monastery, so she bought the church, hospital and surrounding fields from the Teutonic order that moved to the church of Sts. Benedict nearby. However, the woman's Cistercian Monastery was founded near Tišnov. Constance of Hungary donated the church with properties to the hospital of St. Francis which was founded by her daughter Agnes in the same year. The original brotherhood hospital has gradually become into the new Czech church order Knights of the Cross with the Red Star which has continued to provide worships there to this day.

==== Description ====
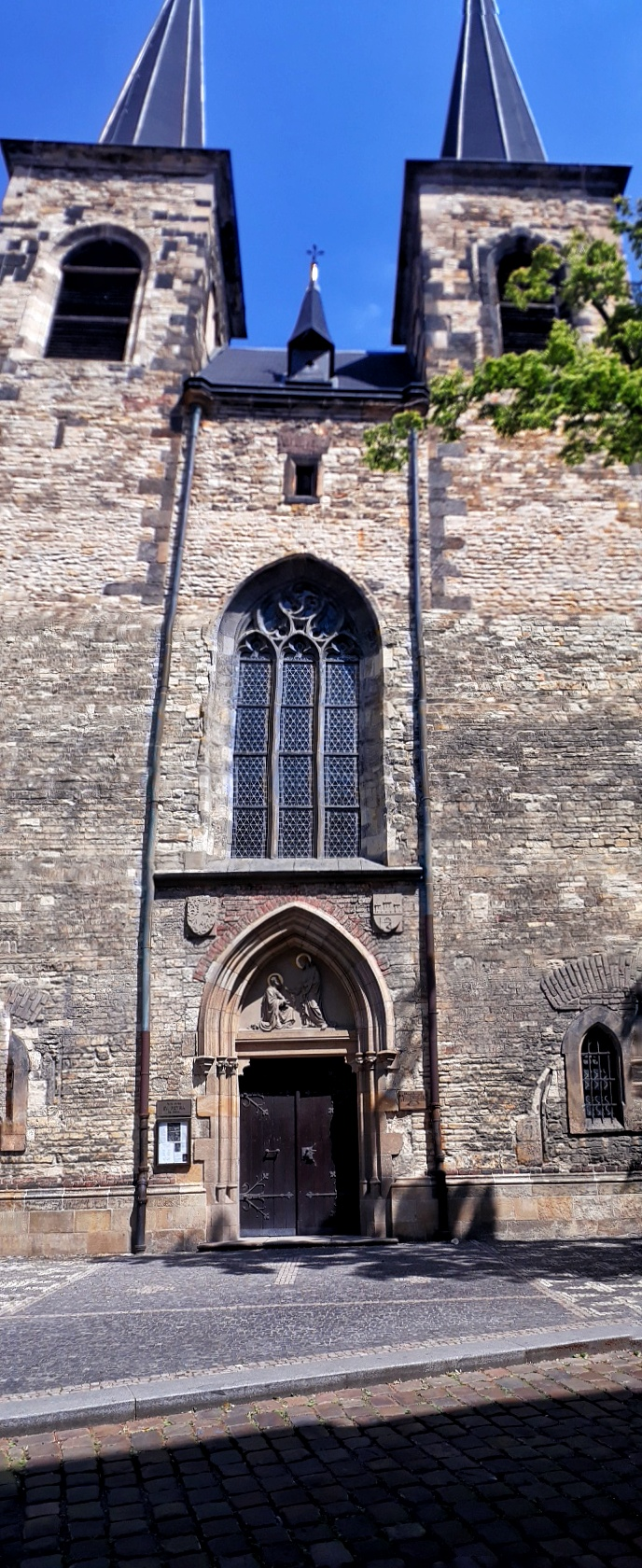
West Frontage

The Romanesque basilica had a frontage with two towers (which are preserved to this day) in the west part of the church, there was also a tribune between towers. The original Romanesque portal was already demolished in the 15th century, as well as smaller windows on the 4th and 5th floors of the tower. The window from the tribune has come down to this day. The main nave was not vaulted but was connected to the tribune. The church was ended with an almost squared choir which consisted of a presbytery and a semicircular apse.

==== Nave ====
Aisles were opened with three arcades supported by parallelepiped pillars that grew out of the broader plinths with corniced head, culminating with similar cornice capitals. Two of the southern row of pillars have come down to this day. Both aisles were covered with a groin vault and were closed by a straight wall on the western side. The basilica's walls were 1 meter thick and were made from stones, which were put on lime mortar. The walls were decorated with paintings and the remains of them are still visible in the segmental arches of the windows. The construction was completed in the second half of the 12th century.

After the floods in 1280, there was built a mass grave near the church, which was later replaced with a regular graveyard. In the beginning of the 14th century there was built a parish school which belonged to the church.

=== Gothic Reconstruction ===
The Gothic reconstruction and extension began in 1382. The northern Romanesque nave was demolished and it was replaced by a Gothic two-aisles construction whereas the southern nave of the double nave copied the ground plan of the original northern Romanesque one. The construction was completed in 1395. However, the Romanesque presbytery did not fit into the new configuration of the church therefore the preparation for the new one began. It was completed in 1406 - the new presbytery was five-sided and two-times wider than the previous Romanesque presbytery, and it occupied the main Romanesque nave and also the southern Gothic aisle. Regardless, the church looked strange because the new presbytery did not follow the main Romanesque nave and the southern Gothic one. That is probably reason, why another rebuilding began. During the remodeling of the temple was pulled down the main Romanesque nave and southern Gothic nave and instead of them was constructed a new massive Gothic nave. The South Romanesque nave has been kept. The reconstruction finished around 1411.

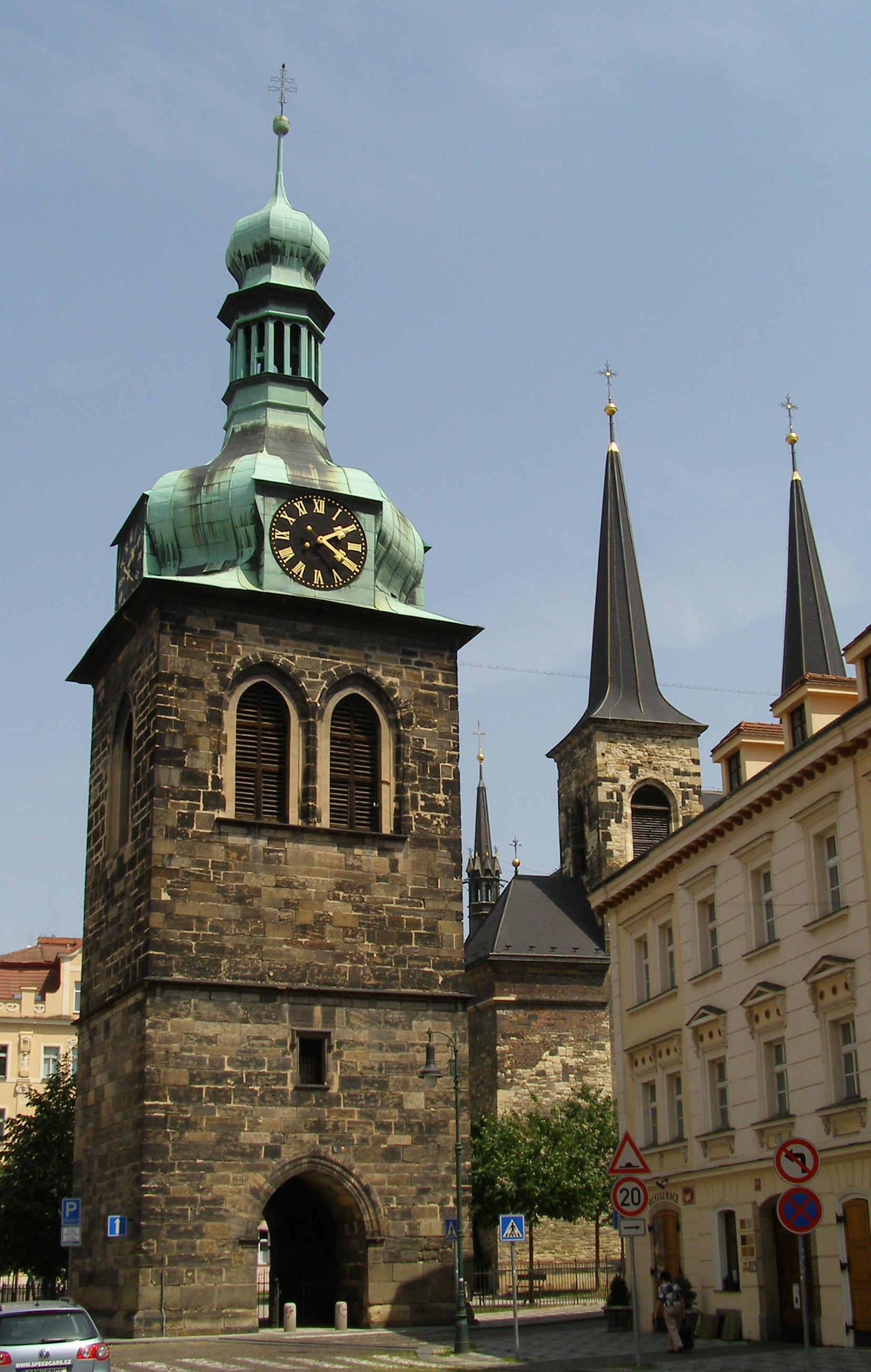
Bell Tower

=== Hussite period ===
In 1414, during the Hussite period, the Knights' pastor Nicholas implemented a unique method of holy communion which was adding to normal Catholic communion at the main altar, this communion contained delivery of the wine and bread (communion under both kinds) to preyers at side altars. In 1419, after the battle, the Hussites evicted the Knights of the church and the pastor Nicholas avoided a lapidation just in time. The church itself was not destroyed, because of its previous communion in the Protestants way. The Knights returned in 1436, and then George of Poděbrady reinstated the hussite priest.

==== Second half of the 15th century ====
Another reconstruction was planned. The southern Romanesque nave was dismantled (two columns were preserved to this day) and replaced with a new, two-times wider Gothic nave. The two towers were also rebuilt into Gothic style - the existing Romanesque windows were replaced with new large Gothic ones. The changes also intervened the entrance portals - the western one was rebuilt and a new one was created in the south side. A new chapel arose between the northern Romanesque tower and the northern nave (now used as a confessional). The rooftops were covered with slates. Because of that, the church gained a new look, and the rebuilding was completed around 1500. A tin plate baptismal font with a dated inscription was procured in 1544 and a Gothic bell tower was added to the church in 1598.

=== Thirty Years' War and other catastrophes ===
==== The 17th century ====
After the Battle of White Mountain, the last non Catholic priest, Lutheran Stephan, was exiled from the church and the church was taken care of by the New Town Council. The church was returned to the Knights in 1628. During the Thirty Years' War in 1632, the town was shortly controlled by the Saxons and Lutheran Stephan became temporarily the parish priest again. The church was destroyed during the siege by the Swedish in 1648. For the brave defense of Prague King Ferdinand III. the Habsburg took the church from the Knights and gave it to the New Town Council.

The church suffered from an extensive fire and after that it was repaired and newly paved by charges from the New Town Council in 1653. The tower was hit by lightning and afterwards damaged by subsequent fire in 1666 and the church and its surroundings were hit by a great fire in 1680. The roof of the main nave and the turrets burned down and also the chapel in the cemetery, the full ossuary, the clergy house, and the steeple, where all three bells melted. The church was left in a bad condition after the fire because the New Town Council did not have money to repair it. in 1686, the council closed a deal with the Knights to whom they returned the church. A long repair of the church began, which was also financed by the Knights (the Prague Archbishop, the Knight John Frederic of Waldstein, also contributed) and a new roof was built. A smaller conflagration affected the belfry in 1689. During another repair, the belfry's roof gots its characteristic Baroque rooftop.

==== The 18th century ====
There were installed new benches (which are kept to this day) in 1700. On eighth of February in 1702, Strahov abbot and bishop Vit Seipel consecrated the restored main altar of St. Peter, where a painting by Wenzel Lorenz Reiner was later delivered. One year later, cracked vaults were repaired, threatening to collapse from the fire in 1680.

The Prussians damaged the church in 1757. Along with the repair of the damaged parts, the interior was partly change into baroque style - the choir loft was rebuilt, and the entire space in the middle of the towers. The church was paved with marble and the baroque plaster was used for the walls. These adjustments were made during 1760-61.

==== Alters ====
At that time, there were already seven altars - the main St. Peter, St. Charles Borromeo, St. John of Nepomuk, St. Anna, St. Barbara, the altar of Christ's wounds, and the Soul's altar. Another altars were added during the first half of the 18th century - the restored St. Mary Magdalene,

St. Lazarus, St. Florian with a painting by Johann Peter Molitor (1702-1756) and two other "private" altars. The main altar of st. Peter was enhanced with carvings of angels from the workshop of Matthias Bernard Braun in 1725.

=== Romanesque and Gothic Revival ===
In the years 1874–1879 with expenses from the New Town council, the church was completely rebuilt and repaired by the architect Josef Mocker, who puristically reconstructed it.

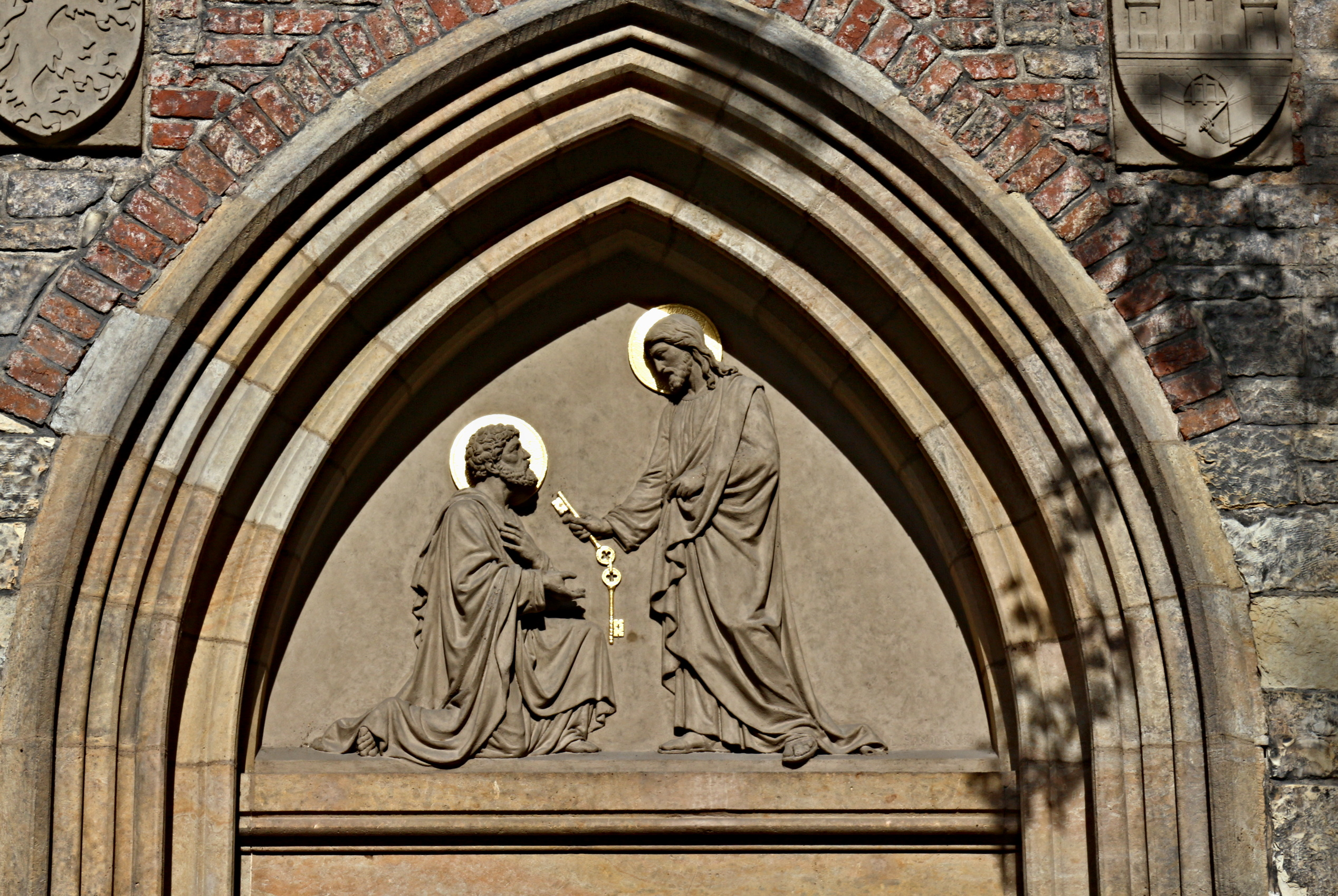
Tympanum with Christ and St. Peter

==== Exterior ====
In the beginning, the Baroque plaster was removed and the church showed its stones. After that it was decided to the demolition - the baroque shield of the main nave, including the portal, were demolished and five supporting pillars were met by the same fate. They were rebuilt with a new plinth, as well as new pseudo-Gothic portals on the south, north and west sides. The new main portal was decorated with the Gothic Revial tympanum of Christ and St. Peter by Lewis Šimek, and also with a Czech and Prague emblem next to it. The crown of the southern and northern nave was raised, as well as the sacristy and the northwestern chapel. The church also received new roofs and on the north side was added a chimney with a modern sculpture. The windows were also touched with big changes, some were walled up, others were taken down and others (especially Baroque ones) rebuilt.

==== Interior ====
The Baroque and Renaissance plastering disappeared in the interior, the windows were replaced with new ones from Neuhauser company. There were also placed new benches (not all) and a confessional. The change influenced even the altars, leaving only six out of the original twelve altars. The Baroque balustrade of the choir loft remained preserved and the emblem of the New Town of Prague was inserted to its center. The whole expensive constructions and reconstructions were completed in 1885.

=== The 20th century ===
During the reconstruction of the church in 1913 –1914, a thorough archaeological and building historical research began. The rudiments of the Romanesque basilica were mainly discovered, and also other Romanesque and Gothic elements. After the research a new interior repair started with restoration of altar paintings during 1929 -1936. That brought other new Gothic Revival and Romanesque Revival elements to the church. However, this time they were placed only to places where they have been proven in the past. The church was confiscated from the Knights again after 1948 and was returned after 1989. Another major revision was in 1989–1991. A paving in a part of the church collapsed after the floods in 2002.

== Architectural description ==
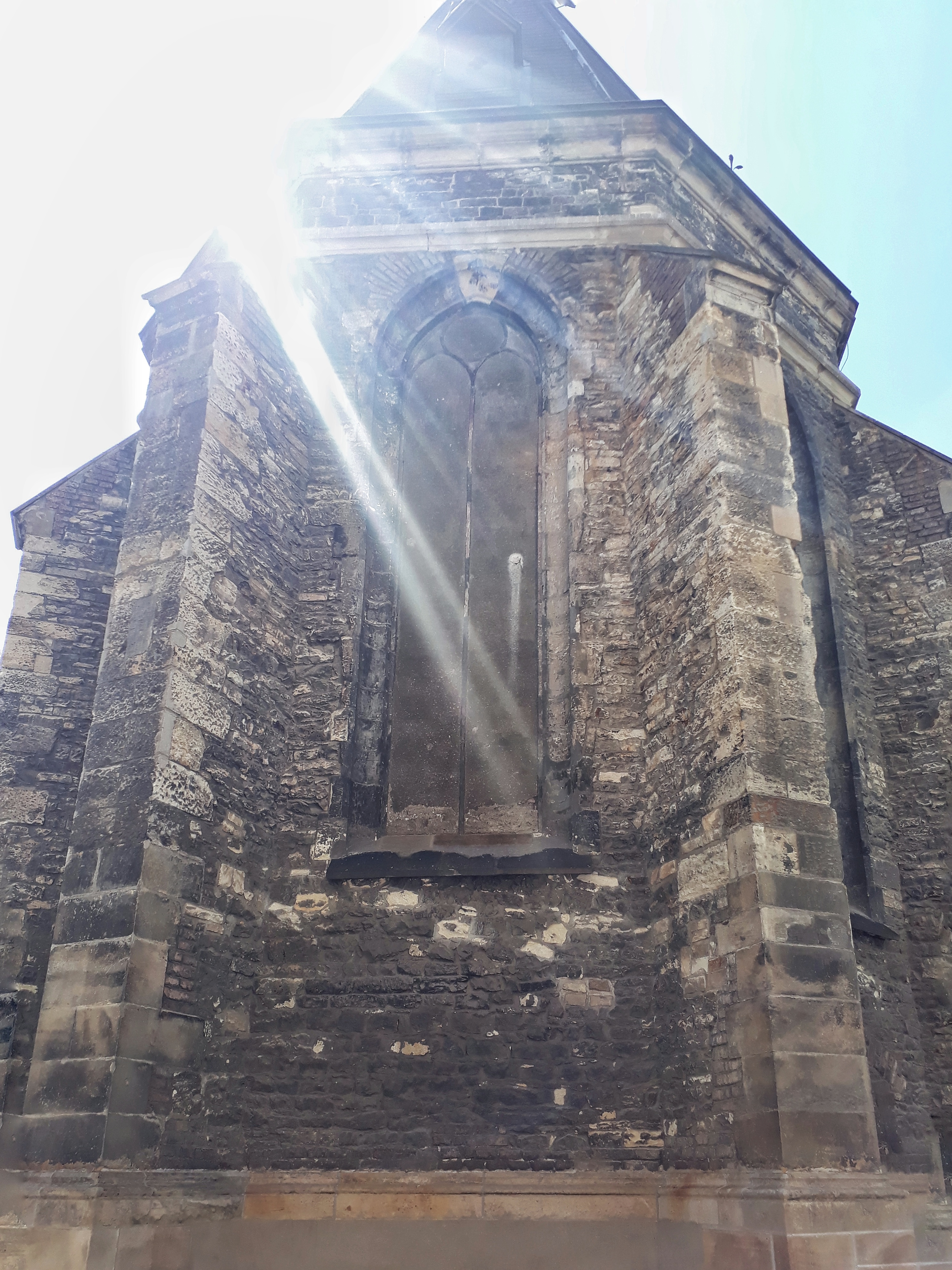
East Frontage

The original building was a Romanesque basilica which was reconstructed many times and today's church is mainly in Gothic style with Romanesque elements.

=== Exterior ===
The church is composed of three-aisles with two towers. The walls are thick up to one meter and the masonry is made out of marble. Almost every side of the church (not the west side) has supporting pillars, which end at the same level as a cornice above windows. The church has three entrances, on the west, north and south sides. The western frontage is mainly Romanesque. The main portal is decorated with a tympanum with Jesus with St. Peter. On the sides of the portal is a Czech and Prague's emblem.

=== Interior ===
The church galleries are separated by arcades. A strip of smaller windows is situated above the arcades. The ceiling of the church consists of a Gothic groin vault, which goes into corbels. The floor is lined with marble. The presbytery has seven gothic windows, but one which faces to the main altar, is walled up. On the north side of the church there are windows with stained glass. Stained glass windows from the rest of the sides were replaced with pseudo-gothic monochrome glass.

The presbytery ends with a semicircular apse with a sacristy. A pulpit is on the left side of the presbytery.

The benches are situated in the main nave and the pipe organ stands in a choir loft in the western part of the church .

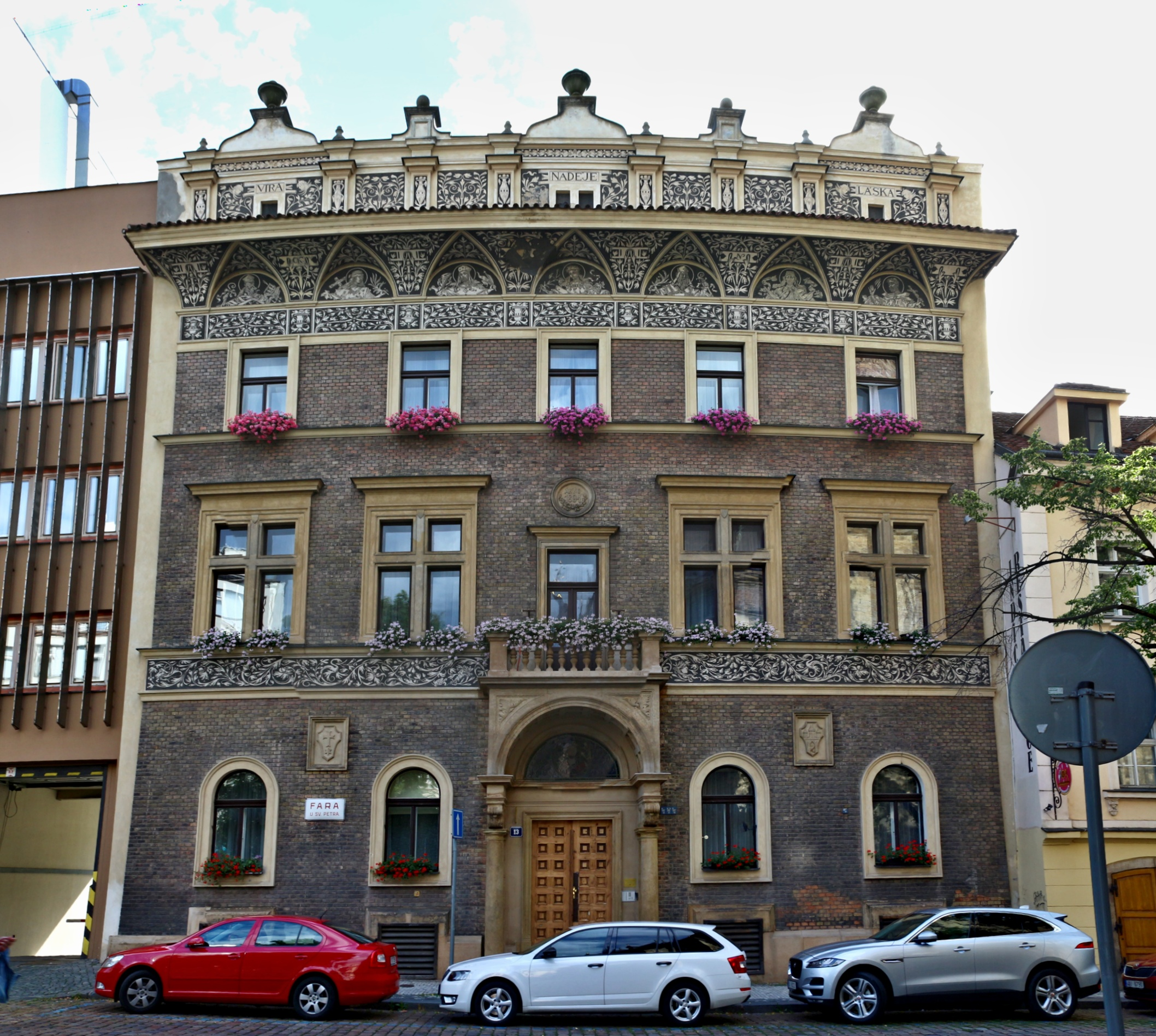
Clergy House at St. Peter

== The clergy house at St. Peter in Prague ==
The Renaissance Revial building of the clergy house No. 1137 in New Town, Prague 1, Biskupská Street 13 is a part of the church. The clergy house was built in 1893 according to the project of the structural bureau, which was prepared by the constructor Constantine Mráček. The facade was designed by a significant Czech architect of the 19th century, Antonín Wiehl. The author of the sgraffito designs on the facade is Celda Klouček, and according to his design it was made by Ladislav Novák. The house is listed in the Central List of Cultural Monuments. The facade of the clergy house is ended with a lunette cornice, and lunettes are decorated with sgraffito which they are derived from the Schwarzenberg Palace. In the brickwork of the facade is sgraffito plaster, architectural elements out of sandstone and on the first floor there is a medallion with the year 1894. On the ground floor there are shields with the signs of the New Town and the Knights of the Cross with the Red Star that are used as a decorative element. The emblem of the Crusaders reminds us that "Now the parish priest of the parish priest after Fr. Štolský is Josef Christ, a priest of the Order of the Cross with the Red Star. The new glergy house in the street Biskupksá No. 13 was built by the architect Ant. Wiehl; the facade is decorated by C. Klouček."

== Literature ==
- Baťková J. a kol.: Umělecké památky Prahy – Nové Město, Vyšehrad. Academia. Praha 1998.
- Bitnar V.: Průvodce Prahou Svatováclavskou. Svatováclavský výbor. Praha 1928.
- Ekert, F.: Posvátná místa královského hlavního města Prahy – svazek II. Praha 1883. Reprint, Volvox Globator. Praha 1996.
- Kulač J., Opatrný T.: Kostel sv. Petra na Poříčí v Praze. Praha 1940.

=== External links ===
- Panoramic sight on Prague
- Church of St. Peter on Poříčí
