= Puchner's Ark =

Gothic retable commissioned in 1482

Puchner's Ark is a Gothic retable commissioned in 1482 by Nikolaus Puchner, Grand Master of the Knights of the Cross with the Red Star, for the church of St. Francis of Assisi in Prague's Old Town. The anonymous author of the panel paintings is referred to as the Master of the Puchner Altar. Part of the altar is on display in the National Gallery in Prague.

Puchner's Ark (part)

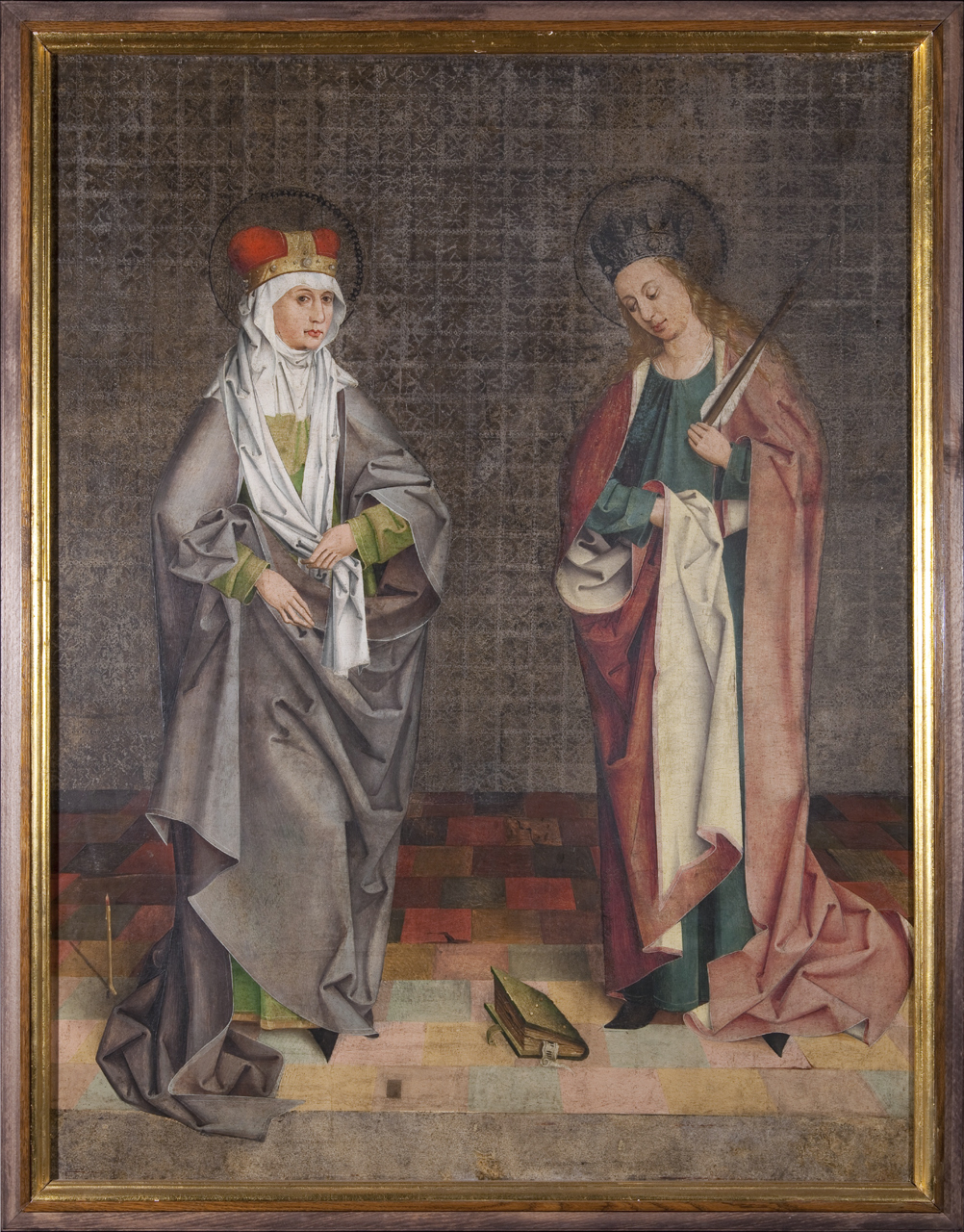
St. Ludmila and St. Ursula

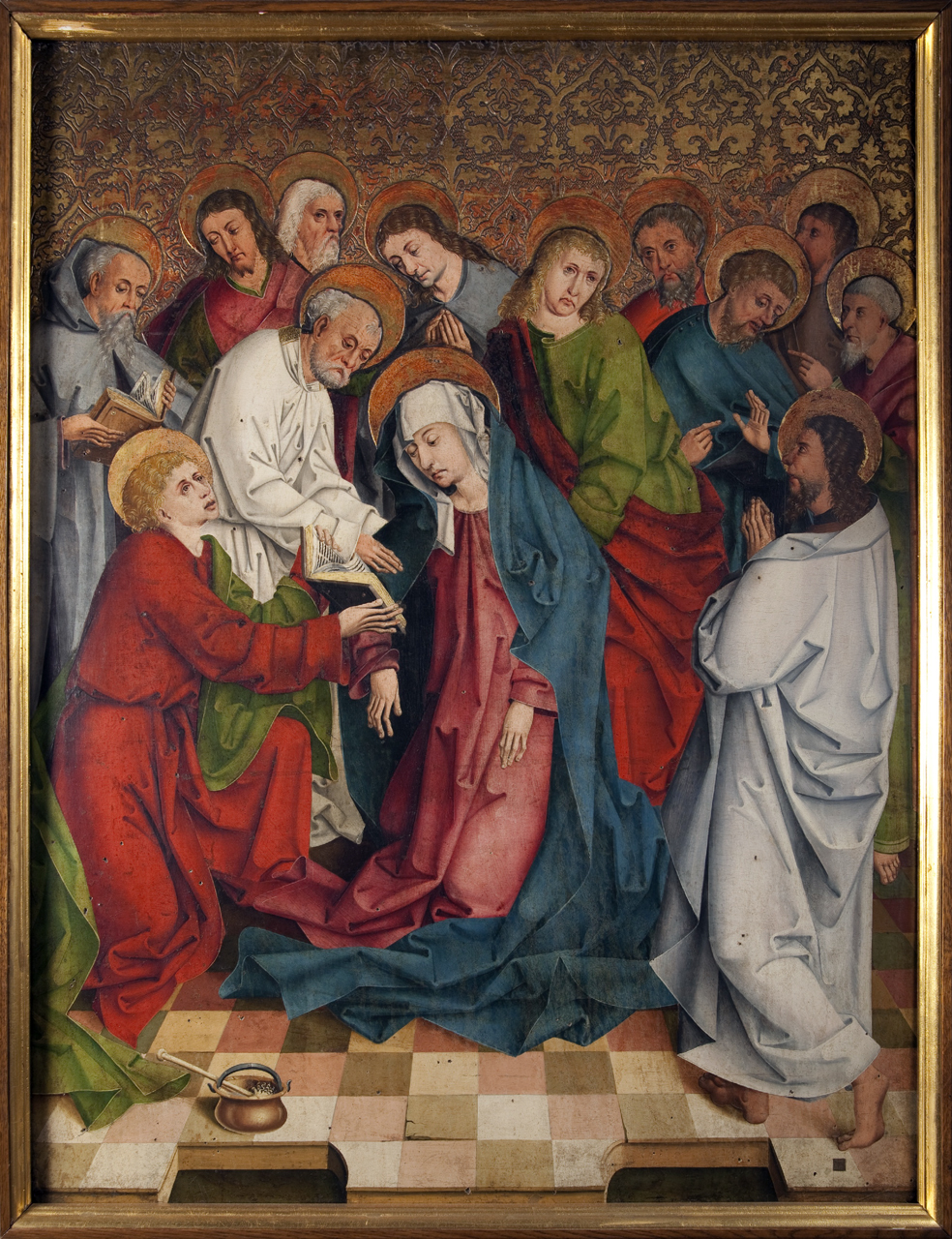
Death of the Virgin Mary

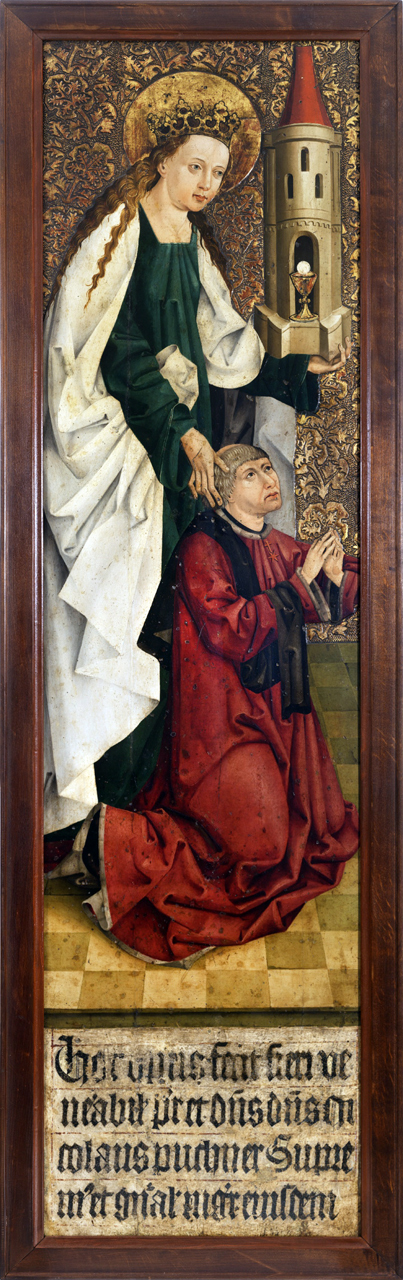
Saint Barbara with Nikolaus Puchner

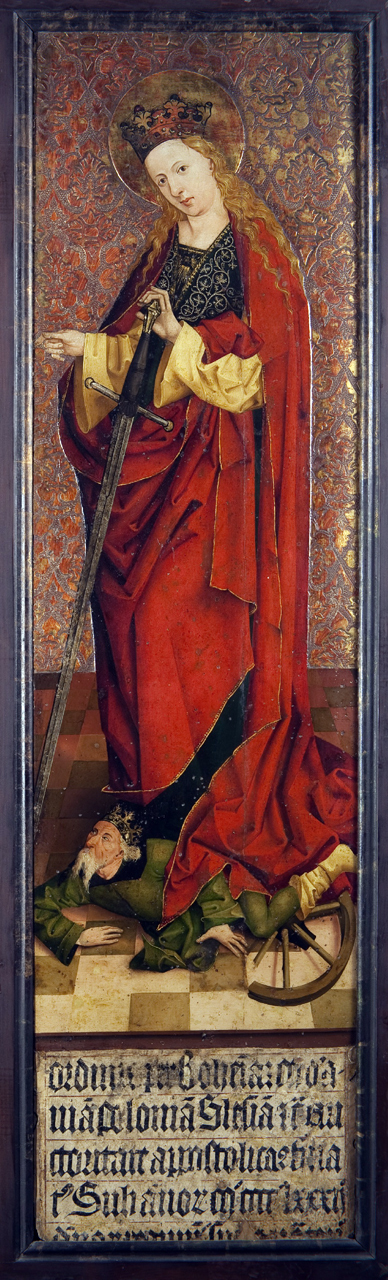
St. Catherine

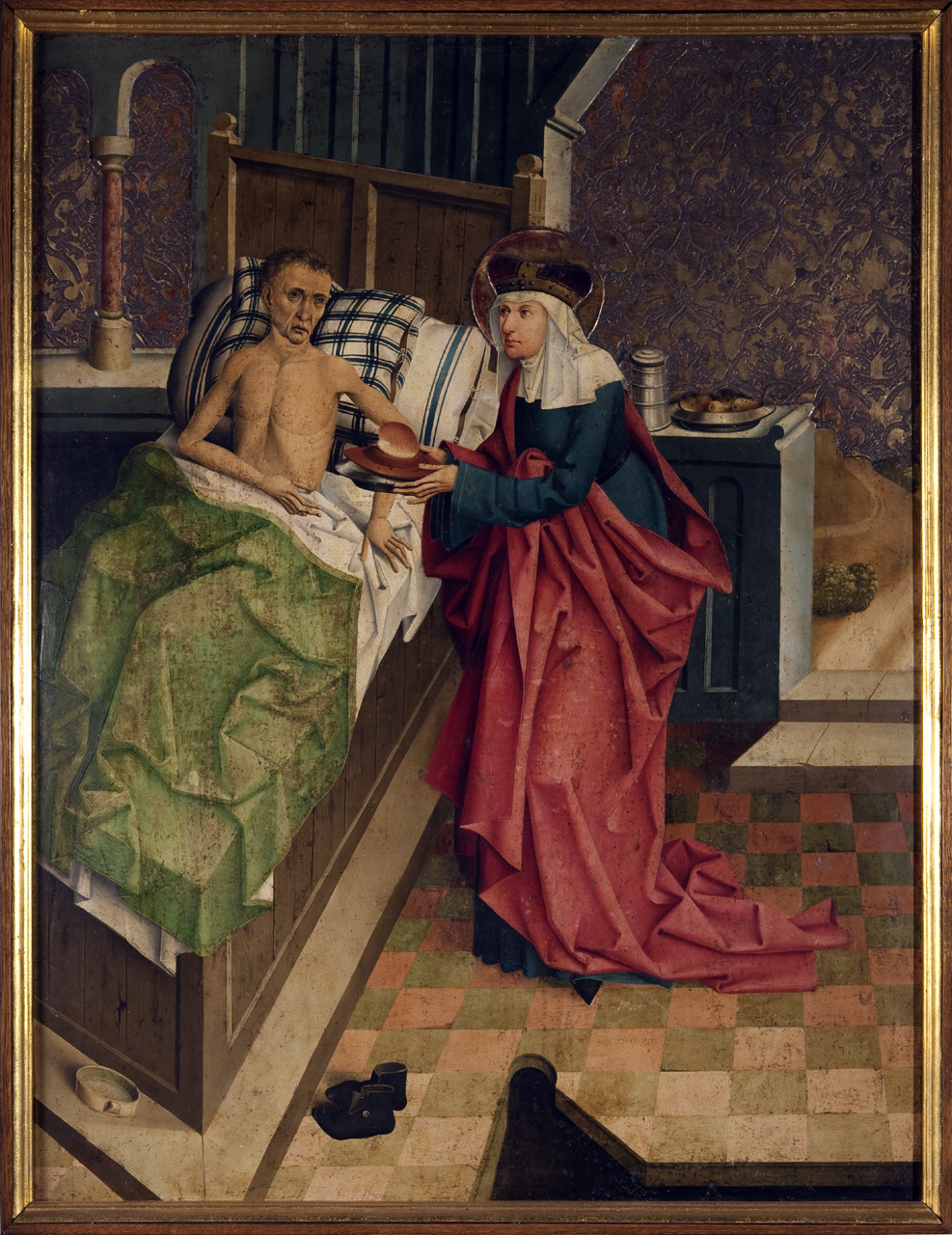
St. Hedwig

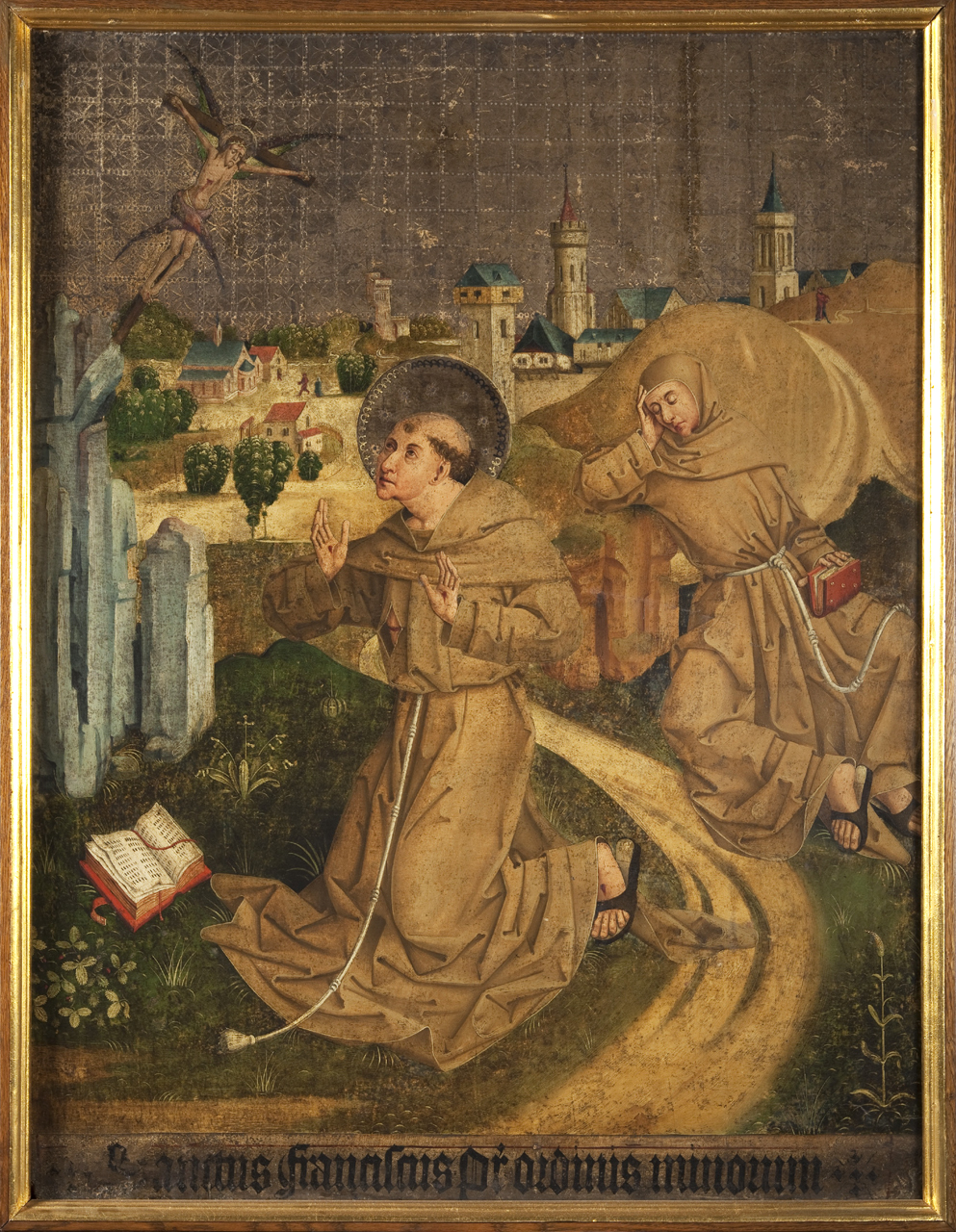
Stigmatization of St. Francis

== Historical background of the altar and its depiction ==
The Knights of the Cross with the Red Star is the only male order founded in Bohemia, with its centre in Prague and a history dating back to the 13th century. Originally it was a lay hospital fraternity, which was founded in 1233 by Agnes of Bohemia at the convent of the Poor Clares and the Church of St. Haštal, following the example of St. Hedwig. The Brotherhood was guided by the Rule of Saint Augustine and the ideas of St. Francis of Assisi, and its main mission was the care of the sick. In the same year, Agnes' mother, Queen Constance of Hungary, bought the church of St. Peter in Poříčí, including several villages, from the Order of the Teutonic Knights and gave it to the Brotherhood.

In 1237, the Pope elevated the Brotherhood to a knightly order and its members exercised spiritual administration over the parishes entrusted to them as canons of the Order. The Order's emblem, which is a cross accompanied by a five-pointed star, was granted by the Pope at the request of St Agnes in the 1350s. In 1252 Agnes founded a new hospital with the Church of the Holy Spirit (later St. Francis) on the Old Town side of the Judith Bridge ("ad pedem pontis pragensis"). The Order gradually founded other hospitals and churches in Bohemia, Moravia and Silesia. It also had an important branch in Wrocław, where St. Hedwig came from.

On 29 November 1378, the day of Charles IV's death, a fire broke out in the Order hospital of St. Francis, destroying the church and the convent with all its valuables, documents and privileges. During the Hussite Wars, the Knights of the Cross Order had to retreat to Catholic western Bohemia. It lost most of its property, which at that time included not only hospitals but also a number of parishes. After the Hussite Wars, the Knights of the Cross with the Red Star actively participated in the recatholization of the country, and during the Jagiellonian period it flourished again and managed to regain some of its property. From 1460 to 1490, Nikolaus Puchner became its twentieth Grand Master and commissioned a new main altar with a statue of the Virgin Mary (Assumpta) and scenes dedicated to the history, mission and spirituality of the Order.

== Description of the work ==
Puchner's Ark is a large winged altar with a central statue of the Virgin Mary, two fixed and two painted wings on both sides. It was the main altar of the convent of the Knights of the Cross with the Red Star. The statue of the Madonna standing on a crescent (Assumpta type) was probably accompanied by two angels bearing a crown in the original architecture of the altar. The style of carving suggests that the work came from a Nuremberg workshop. The statue is permanently housed in the Church of St. Francis of Assisi in Prague's Old Town.

The paintings on the wings of the altar are influenced by Dutch naturalism (Dieric Bouts), evident in the careful drawing of small details, the portrait-like characterization of faces, and the realism of the time, which brings the depicted action into the viewer's present and interprets it as an actual story. The characteristic features of the painting style are space depicted in the form of scenery flats, with an implausible perspective with multiple focal points, some naturalistic elements of vegetation and architecture, non-dramatic scenes, and cool colours rendered in large continuous areas. The light comes from a single source and the depth of the space is suggested, for example, by the cast shadow of a candle. The background is replaced by a gilded engraved ornament. The shapes are harder, with an emphasis on drawing, the sculptural volumes of the bodies and draperies are modelled with painting techniques. Underdrawing is visible in places. The inner sides of the retable are gilded and decorated with tin relief ornament imitating brocade, the outer sides are decorated with silver foil with a simpler geometric pattern.

The two tall panel paintings framing the statue of the Virgin Mary in the altar cabinet show, on the left, the figures of St Barbara with the kneeling donor Nicolas Puchner turning to the Virgin Mary, on the right St Catherine with her usual attributes (wheel, sword, figure of the humiliated Emperor Maxentius). The inscription at the bottom of the painting gives the year of the altar's consecration as the bicentenary of the death of St Agnes in 1482.

On the upper part of the left movable wing of the altar, St Agnes is depicted as a princess handing a model of the church to the first Grand Master of the Order, Albert of Sternberg. On the opposite side, St. Hedwig of Silesia is depicted wearing a ducal cap, nursing a sick man in bed. Hedwig was the wife of Prince Henry of Silesia and founded the hospital in Wrocław. Agnes was betrothed at the age of 3 to their son Konrad and the Knights Order had a branch monastery there. This painting has often been misunderstood as a depiction of St Agnes. In principle, there can be no doubt that this is St. Hedwig of Silesia - see the ducal cap and the fact that St. Agnes as a Poor Clare was not allowed to leave the cloister and treat the sick. At the bottom left is the Death of the Virgin Mary with the Last Prayer, on the right the Crucifixion scene.

On the upper part of the rear side of the wings were pairs of saints. The surviving left wing shows the patron saint of the country, St. Ludmila, together with St. Ursula, who was popular in the hospital fraternity as a protector against the plague; the missing right part may have depicted St. Wenceslas. At the bottom of the rear side of the wing is St. Augustine teaching the Knights of the Cross, among whom is again the figure of Nikolaus Puchner. On the other wing is a scene of the stigmatization of St. Francis. The saint has a direct connection with St. Agnes as the founder of the Convent of Saint Agnes in Prague, and the apparition of the Holy Cross, carried by a seraph, refers to the Order of the Knights of the Cross. The composition comes from a graphic design by Monogrammist E.S. The individual parts of the retable were complemented in the lower part by inscriptions, which have only partially survived.

Some of the panel paintings that are part of the altar (St. Agnes with Grand Master Albert of Sternberg, Crucifixion, St. Augustine teaching the Knights of the Cross) are located in the convent of the Knights of the Cross with the Red Star, the others are on permanent display in the National Gallery in Prague.

== Sources ==
- Fajt, Jiří, Chlumská, Štěpánka, Bohemia and Central Europe 1200-1550, National Gallery in Prague 2014, ISBN 978-80-7035-569-5
- Štěpánka Chlumská, Technique of tin relief on panel paintings of the Rakovník, Rokycany and Litoměřice altars, Technologia Artis 6(2008), AVU in Prague, pp.66-83(97)
- Jitka Vlčková, The altarpiece of the Grand Master of the Knights of the Cross with the Red Star Order Mikuláš Puchner, in: Kubík V (ed.), The Jagiellonian Age in the Lands of the Czech Crown (1471-1526), UDKU, KTF UK in Prague, T. Halama České Budějovice 2005, ISBN 80-903600-0-9
- Nadolny J.: The Technique and use of gilded relief decoration by Northern European painters, c. 1200 - 1500, Volume II., Thesis Submitted for the Degree of Doctor of Philosophy at the Courtauld Institute of Art, University of London, 2000.
- Jaromír Homolka, in: Late Gothic Art in Bohemia, Odeon Prague 1985, p. 184
- Jaroslav Pešina: Czech Gothic Painting, Odeon, Prague 1972
