= Věteřov =

- Municipality
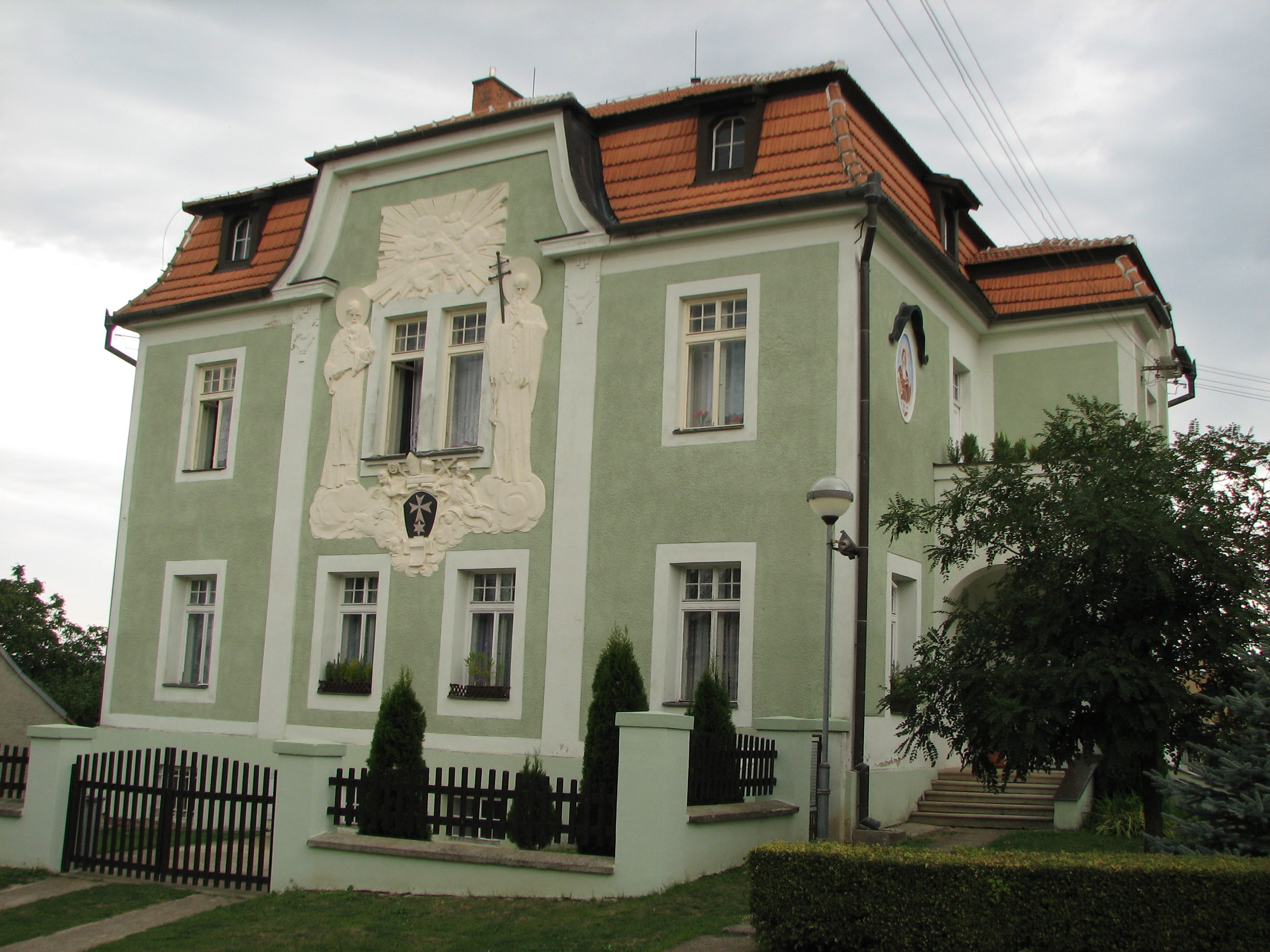
- Rectory

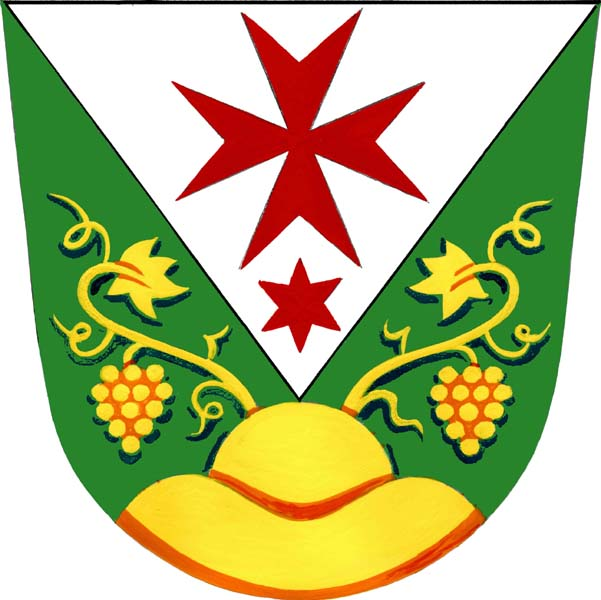
- Flag Coat of arms

- Location in the Czech Republic
- Coordinates: 49°1′43″N 17°3′22″E
- Country: Czech Republic
- Region: South Moravian
- District: Hodonín
- First mentioned: 1141

Area
  - Total: 8.18 km^{2} (3.16 sq mi)
- Elevation: 264 m (866 ft)

Population (2026-01-01)
  - Total: 540
  - Density: 66/km^{2} (170/sq mi)
- Time zone: UTC+1 (CET)
  - Summer (DST): UTC+2 (CEST)
- Postal code: 697 01
- Website: www.veterov.eu

Věteřov is a municipality and village in Hodonín District in the South Moravian Region of the Czech Republic. It has about 500 inhabitants.

Věteřov lies approximately 21 kilometres (13 mi) north of Hodonín, 38 km (24 mi) south-east of Brno, and 224 km (139 mi) south-east of Prague.

== History ==
The first written mention of Věteřov is from 1141.

== Demographics ==
Historical population
Year	Pop.	±%
1869	679	—
1880	737	+8.5%
1890	731	−0.8%
1900	723	−1.1%
1910	713	−1.4%
1921	742	+4.1%
1930	760	+2.4%
1950	715	−5.9%
1961	748	+4.6%
1970	654	−12.6%
1980	585	−10.6%
1991	517	−11.6%
2001	518	+0.2%
2011	529	+2.1%
2021	470	−11.2%
Source: Censuses
