= Mašovice =

- Municipality
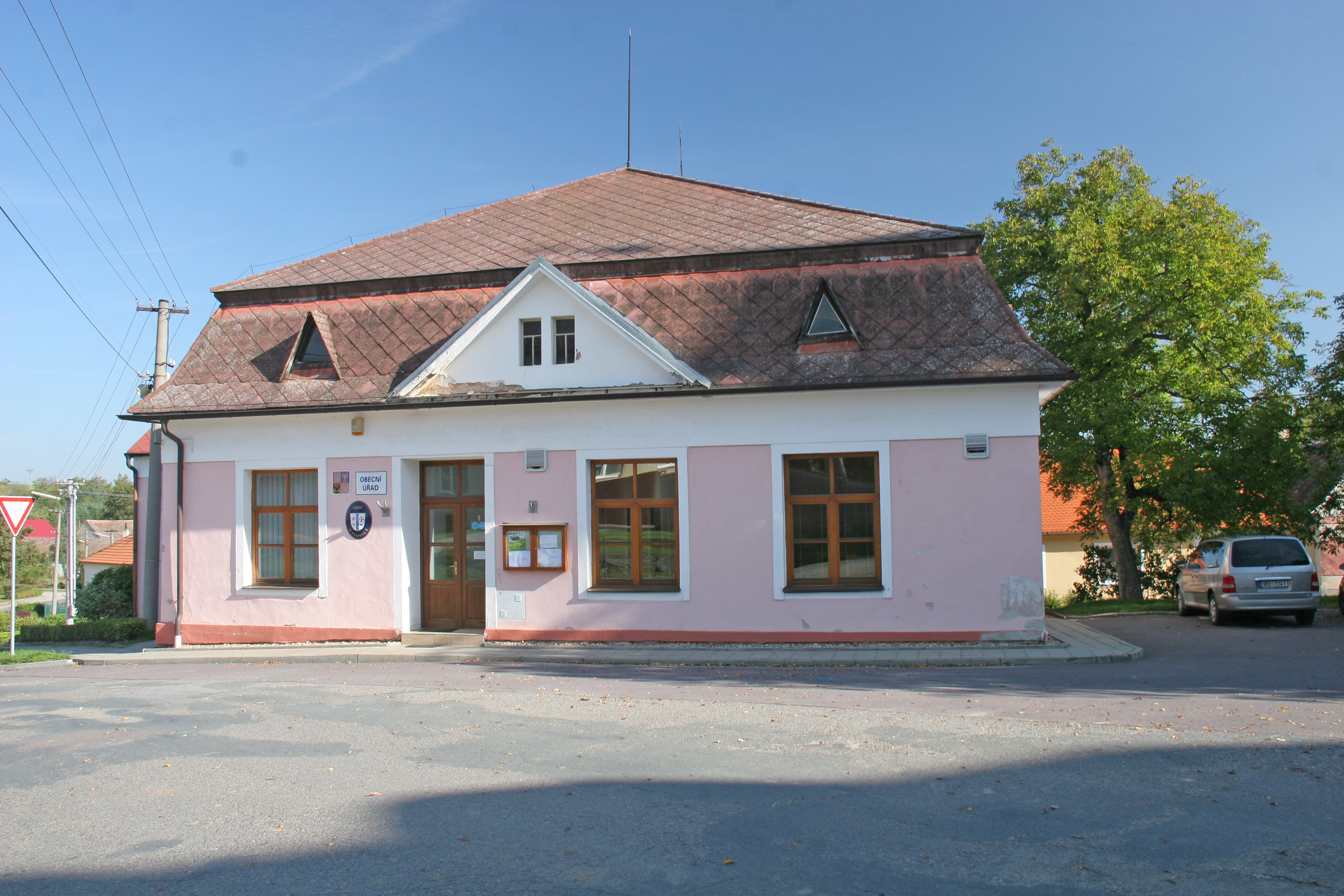
- Municipal office

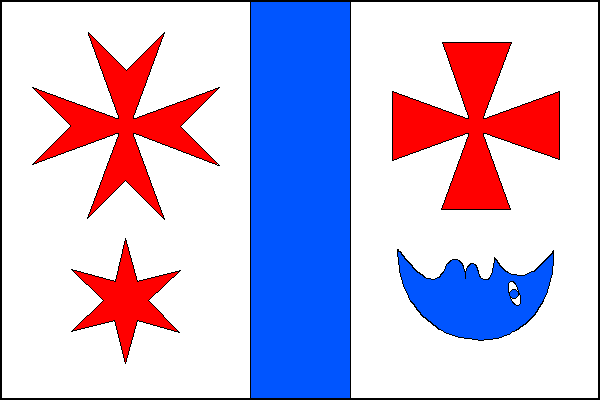
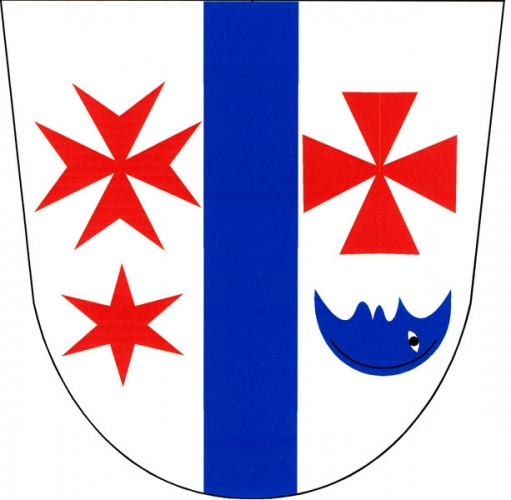
- Flag Coat of arms

- Location in the Czech Republic
- Coordinates: 48°51′27″N 15°58′25″E
- Country: Czech Republic
- Region: South Moravian
- District: Znojmo
- First mentioned: 1046

Area
  - Total: 11.14 km^{2} (4.30 sq mi)
- Elevation: 364 m (1,194 ft)

Population (2026-01-01)
  - Total: 544
  - Density: 48.8/km^{2} (126/sq mi)
- Time zone: UTC+1 (CET)
  - Summer (DST): UTC+2 (CEST)
- Postal code: 669 02
- Website: www.masovice.cz

Mašovice is a municipality and village in Znojmo District in the South Moravian Region of the Czech Republic. It has about 500 inhabitants.

Mašovice lies approximately 5 kilometres (3 mi) west of Znojmo, 61 km (38 mi) south-west of Brno, and 177 km (110 mi) south-east of Prague.

== Demographics ==
Historical population
Year	Pop.	±%
1869	511	—
1880	533	+4.3%
1890	536	+0.6%
1900	514	−4.1%
1910	552	+7.4%
1921	581	+5.3%
1930	530	−8.8%
1950	473	−10.8%
1961	476	+0.6%
1970	478	+0.4%
1980	485	+1.5%
1991	432	−10.9%
2001	405	−6.2%
2011	491	+21.2%
2021	509	+3.7%
Source: Censuses
