= Agnes of Bohemia =

Christian saint

Saint Agnes of Bohemia OSC
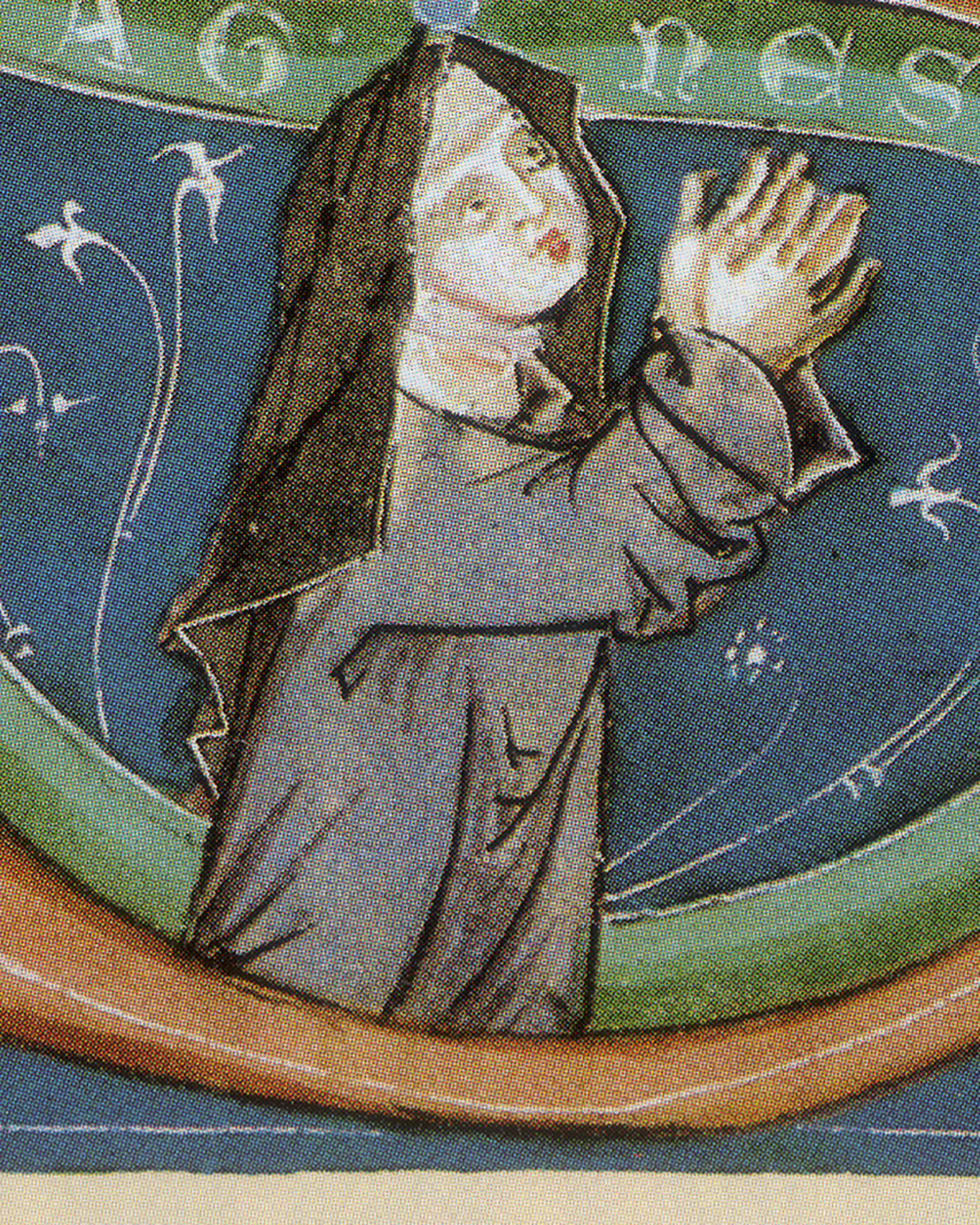
- Agnes of Bohemia

Virgin
- Born: 20 January 1211; Prague, Bohemia
- Died: 2 March 1282; Prague, Bohemia
- Venerated in: Catholic Church
- Beatified: 1874 by Pope Pius IX
- Canonized: 12 November 1989, Vatican City, by Pope John Paul II
- Major shrine: Monastery of St. Agnes; Prague, Czech Republic
- Feast: 13 November
- Patronage: Czech Republic

Agnes of Bohemia, OSC (Czech: Svatá Anežka Česká, 20 January 1211 – 2 March 1282), also known as Agnes of Prague, was a medieval Bohemian princess who opted for a life of charity, mortification of the flesh and piety over a life of luxury and comfort. Although she was venerated soon after her death, Agnes was not beatified or canonized for over 700 years.

== Life ==
=== Childhood ===
Agnes was the daughter of King Ottokar I of Bohemia, making her a descendant of Ludmila of Bohemia and Wenceslaus I, patron saints of Bohemia. Agnes's mother was Constance of Hungary, who was the sister of King Andrew II of Hungary, so Agnes was a first cousin to Elizabeth of Hungary.

When she was three years old, Agnes was entrusted to the care of Hedwig of Andechs, the wife of Duke Henry I the Bearded of Silesia. Hedwig placed her to be educated by a community of Cistercian nuns in a monastery that she herself had founded in Trzebnica. Upon her return to Prague, Agnes was entrusted to a priory of Premonstratensian Canonesses to continue her education.

=== Arranged marriages ===
At the age of eight, Agnes was betrothed to Henry, son of Emperor Frederick II, Holy Roman Emperor. Henry was ten years old and had just been crowned King of Germany. According to custom, Agnes should have spent her childhood at her future husband's court. Emperor Frederick, King of Sicily, had his court in Palermo, but his son Henry, King of Germany, lived in Germany at the palace of Archbishop Engelbert in Cologne.

Agnes was sent to the court of Duke Leopold VI of Babenberg. Leopold, however, wanted the young Henry to marry his daughter, Margaret. After being betrothed for six years, Henry and Agnes's betrothal contract was cancelled. Like other noble women of her time, Agnes was a valuable political pawn. In 1226, Agnes's father Ottokar went to war against the Babenbergs as a result of the cancelled betrothal. Ottokar then planned for Agnes to marry Henry III of England, but this was vetoed by the Emperor, who wanted to marry Agnes himself.

=== Foundress ===
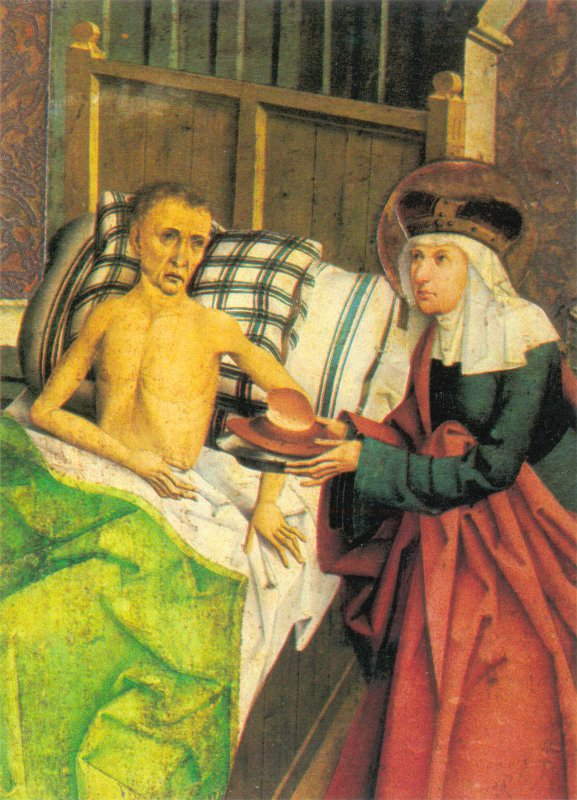
Agnes of Bohemia Tending the Sick by the Bohemian Master, 1482

Agnes refused to play any more part in a politically arranged marriage. She decided to devote her life to prayer and spiritual works, for which she sought the help of Pope Gregory IX. Emperor Frederick is said to have remarked: "If she had left me for a mortal man, I would have taken vengeance with the sword, but I cannot take offence because in preference to me she has chosen the King of Heaven."

On land donated by her brother, Wenceslaus I, King of Bohemia, she founded the Hospital of St. Francis (circa 1232–33) and two friaries for the Franciscan friars, who had just come to Bohemia at her brother's invitation. Through them, Agnes learned of Clare of Assisi and her Order of Poor Ladies, the monastic counterpart of the friars. She began a correspondence with Clare (which lasted for over two decades).

Agnes built a monastery and friary complex attached to the hospital. It housed the Franciscan friars and the Poor Clare nuns who worked at the hospital. This religious complex was one of the first Gothic buildings in Prague. This was the first Poor Clare community north of the Alps. In 1235, Agnes gave the property of the Teutonic Knights in Bohemia to the hospital. She herself became a member of what became known as the Franciscan Poor Clares in 1234. As a nun, she cooked for and mended the clothes of lepers and paupers, even after becoming abbess of the Prague Clares the following year. As can be seen in their correspondence, Clare wrote with deep maternal feelings toward Agnes, though they never met.

A lay group working at the hospital was organized by Agnes in 1238 as a new military order, dedicated primarily to nursing, known as the Knights of the Cross with the Red Star, following the Rule of St. Augustine. That next year, Agnes handed over all authority over the hospital she had founded to these monastic knights. They were recognized as an order by Pope Gregory IX in 1236–37.

Agnes lived out her life in the cloister, leading the monastery as abbess, until her death on 2 March 1282.

== Legacy ==
The Monastery of the Holy Savior, renamed the Convent of Saint Agnes, (Czech: Klášter sv. Anežky) began to fall into decline after the Hussite Wars of the 15th century. The community was abolished in 1782. Restored in the 1960s, the building is now a branch of the National Gallery in Prague, featuring the medieval Central European and Bohemian collections.

== Veneration ==
The beatification process for Agnes was opened on 21 November 1872, and Pope Pius IX beatified her in 1874. Pope John Paul II canonized Blessed Agnes on 12 November 1989. While she was known by her contemporaries because of her supposed visions and healing, such as her prophecy that King Wenceslaus would be victorious in his battle against the Austrians, her canonization was based on her practice of the Christian virtues of faith, hope, and charity to an extraordinary degree, and the church's view is confirmed either through a miracle granted by God in answer to the saint's prayers or as in this case, by the continuing devotion of the Christian faithful to a saint's example across centuries.

Though Agnes died in 1282, she is still venerated by Christians around the world more than 700 years later. She was honored in 2011, the 800th anniversary of her birth, as the Saint of the Overthrow of Communism, with a year dedicated to her by Catholics in the Czech Republic.

== Cultural reference ==
On the occasion of the eight-hundredth anniversary of Agnes' birth, the Prague Archbishopric in cooperation with the National Gallery in Prague organized an exhibition called "Saint Agnes of Bohemia – Princess and Nun" at the national cultural heritage site, the Convent of Saint Agnes in Prague (Old Town). The exhibition was held from November 25, 2011, to March 25, 2012. A similar exhibition, also honoring Agnes of Bohemia, took place some 80 years ago. The exposition held about 300 exhibits. Contributing partners included are the Knights of the Cross with the Red Star, the National Archives and Charles University.

== Ancestry ==
Ancestors of Agnes of Bohemia

16. Vratislaus II of Bohemia
8. Vladislaus I of Bohemia
17. Świętosława of Poland
4. Vladislaus II of Bohemia
18. Henry I of Berg-Schelklingen
9. Richeza of Berg
19. Adelheid of Mochental
2. Ottokar I of Bohemia
20. Louis the Springer
10. Louis I, Landgrave of Thuringia
21. Adelheid von Stade
5. Judith of Thuringia
22. Giso IV, Count of Gudensberg
11. Hedwig of Gudensberg
23. Kunigunde von Bilstein
1. Agnes of Bohemia
24. Béla II of Hungary
12. Géza II of Hungary
25. Helena of Raška
6. Béla III of Hungary
26. Mstislav I of Kiev
13. Euphrosyne of Kiev
27. Liubava Dmitrievna
3. Constance of Hungary
28. Henri de Châtillon
14. Raynald of Châtillon
29. Ermengarde de Montjay
7. Agnes of Antioch
30. Bohemund II of Antioch
15. Constance of Antioch
31. Alice of Antioch

== See also ==
- List of Catholic saints
- Přemyslid dynasty
