= Wenzel Lorenz Reiner =

German painter

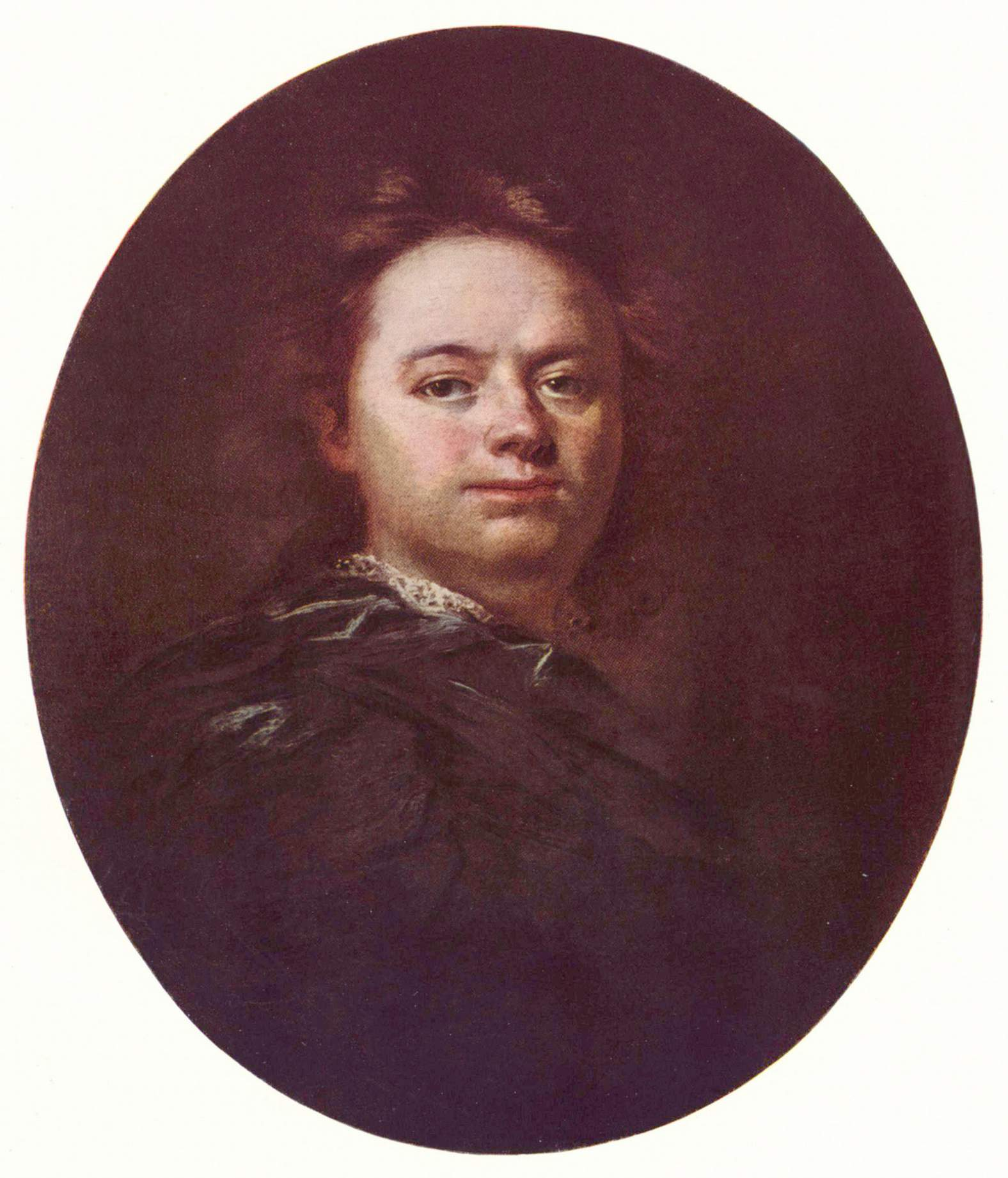
Self-portrait

Wenzel Lorenz Reiner (Czech: Václav Vavřinec Reiner; 8 August 1686 or 1689 – 9 October 1743) was a Baroque painter who lived and died in Prague, Bohemia.

== Gallery ==
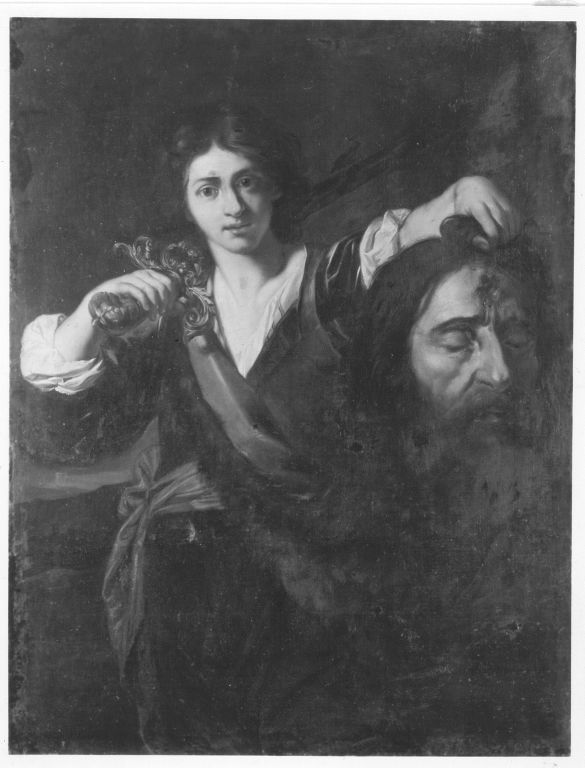
David with the head of Goliath

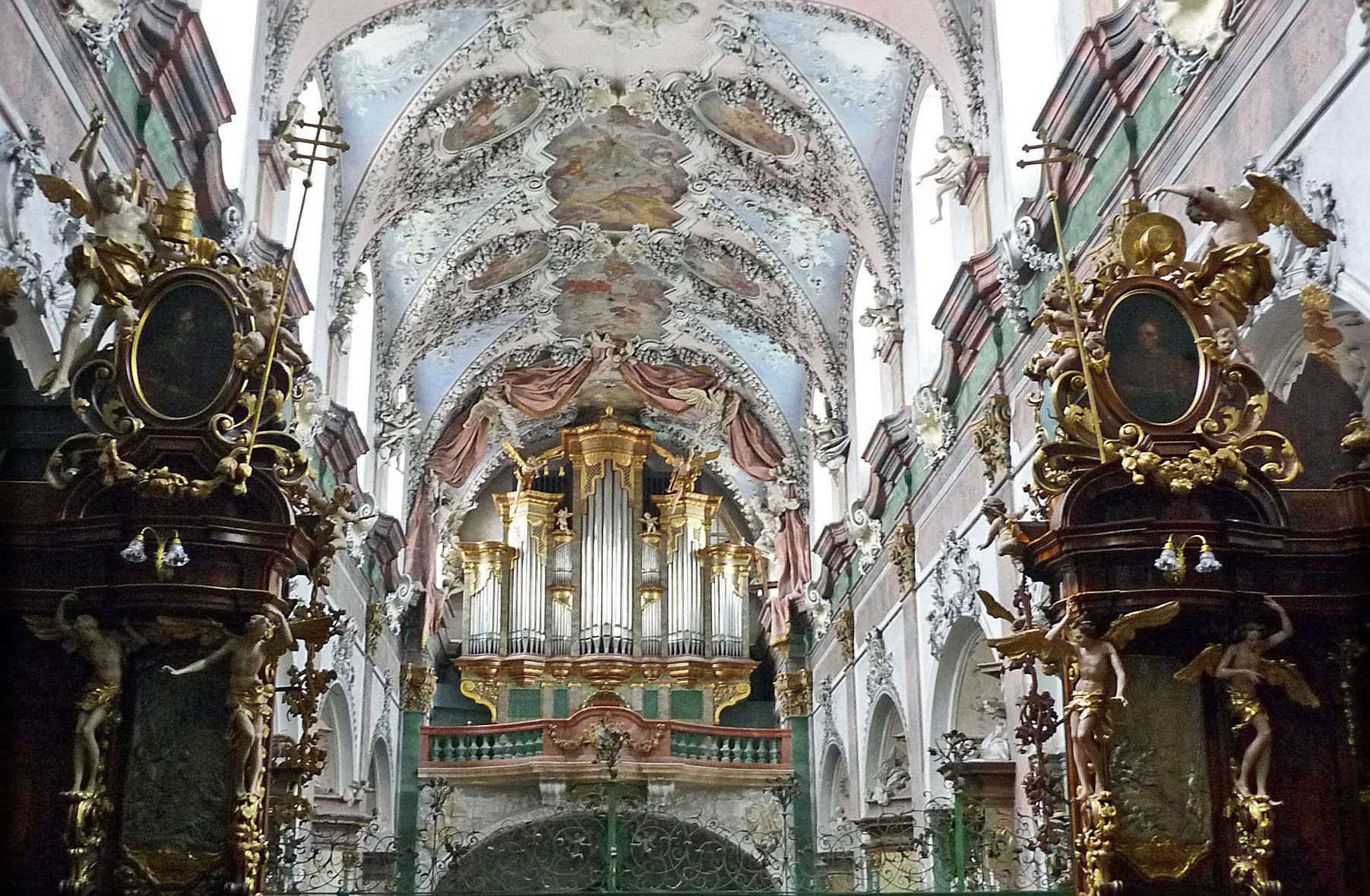
Nave with ceiling painting by Wenzel Lorenz Reiner in the monastery church in Ossegg
