= Cheb (administrative district) =

Administrative district in the Czech Republic

Administrative district of the municipality with extended powers of Cheb Správní obvod obce s rozšířenou působností Cheb
- Administrative district of municipality with extended powers
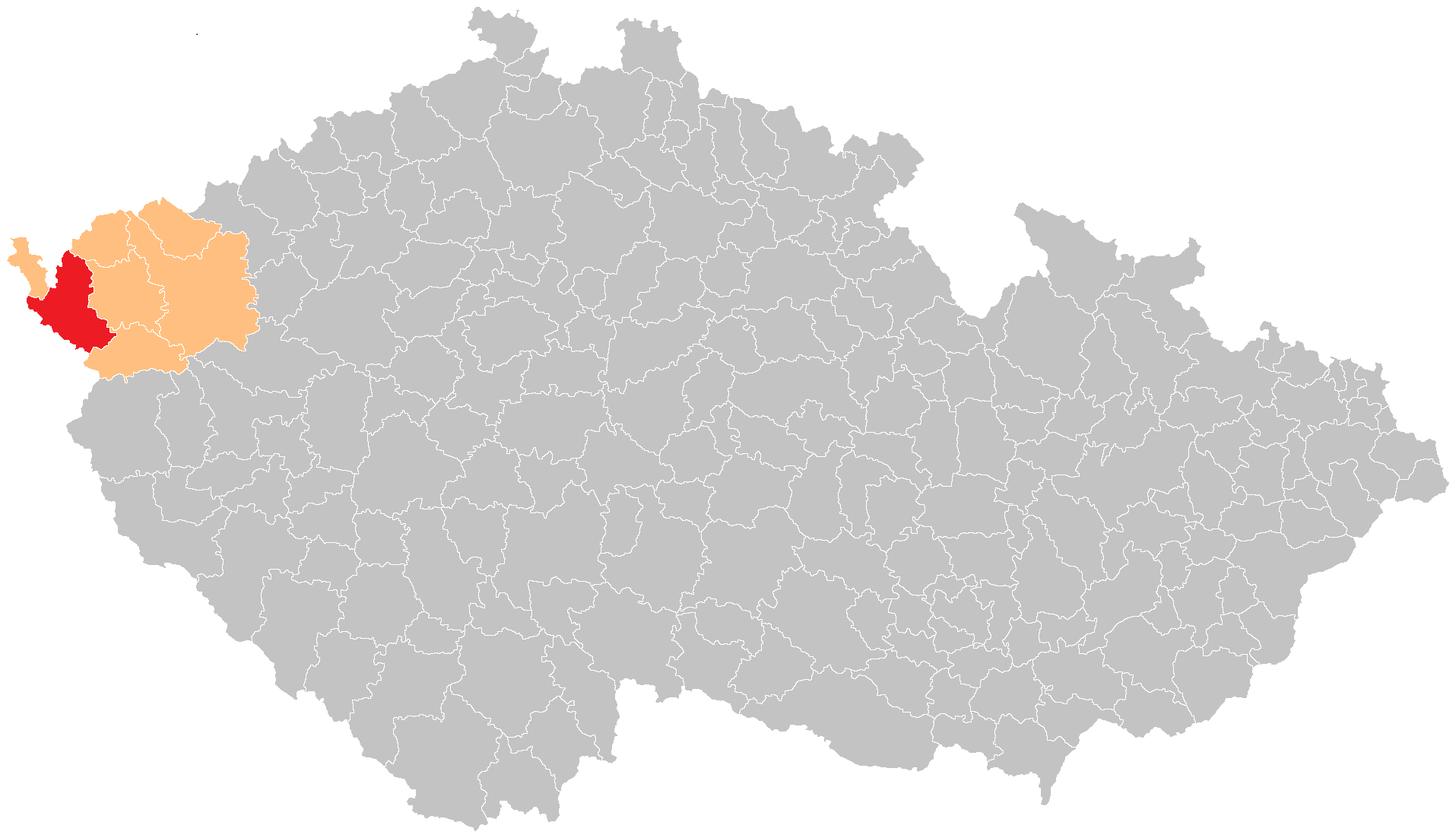
- Location in the Karlovy Vary Region within the Czech Republic
- Coordinates: 50°6′N 12°23′E
- Country: Czech Republic
- Region: Karlovy Vary
- District: Cheb
- Municipality with extended powers: Cheb

Area
  - Total: 496.81 km^{2} (191.82 sq mi)

Population (2024)
  - Total: 51,232
  - Density: 103.12/km^{2} (267.08/sq mi)
- Time zone: UTC+1 (CET)
  - Summer (DST): UTC+2 (CEST)
- Municipalities: 21
- * Cities and towns: 5
- * Market towns: 0

The administrative district of the municipality with extended powers of Cheb (abbreviated AD MEP Cheb; Czech: Správní obvod obce s rozšířenou působností Cheb, SO ORP Cheb) is an administrative district of municipality with extended powers in Cheb District in the Karlovy Vary Region of the Czech Republic. It has existed since 1 January 2003, when the districts were replaced administratively. It includes 21 municipalities which have a combined population of about 51,000.

== Municipalities ==
Towns are in bold.

Municipality	Population	Area (km^{2)}	Density
Dolní Žandov	1,185	41.34	29
**Františkovy Lázně**	5,783	25.76	224
**Cheb**	32,825	96.36	340
Křižovatka	255	14.13	18
Libá	836	26.63	31
Lipová	729	45.76	16
**Luby**	2,299	30.69	75
Milhostov	313	17.63	18
Milíkov	295	19.48	15
Nebanice	338	9.39	36
Nový Kostel	520	43.68	12
Odrava	232	12.65	18
Okrouhlá	252	10.43	24
**Plesná**	1,909	19.26	99
Pomezí nad Ohří	361	10.69	34
Poustka	170	6.98	24
**Skalná**	1,906	23.44	81
Třebeň	459	21.70	21
Tuřany	142	6.11	23
Velký Luh	175	4.52	39
Vojtanov	248	10.19	24

== Demographics ==
Historical population

Year	Pop.	±%
1869	55,026	—
1880	60,433	+9.8%
1890	60,506	+0.1%
1900	65,722	+8.6%
1910	72,466	+10.3%

Year	Pop.	±%
1921	71,472	−1.4%
1930	80,310	+12.4%
1950	37,374	−53.5%
1961	39,944	+6.9%
1970	43,878	+9.8%

Year	Pop.	±%
1980	47,710	+8.7%
1991	47,842	+0.3%
2001	49,655	+3.8%
2011	49,743	+0.2%
2021	47,187	−5.1%

Source: Censuses
