= Plessner =

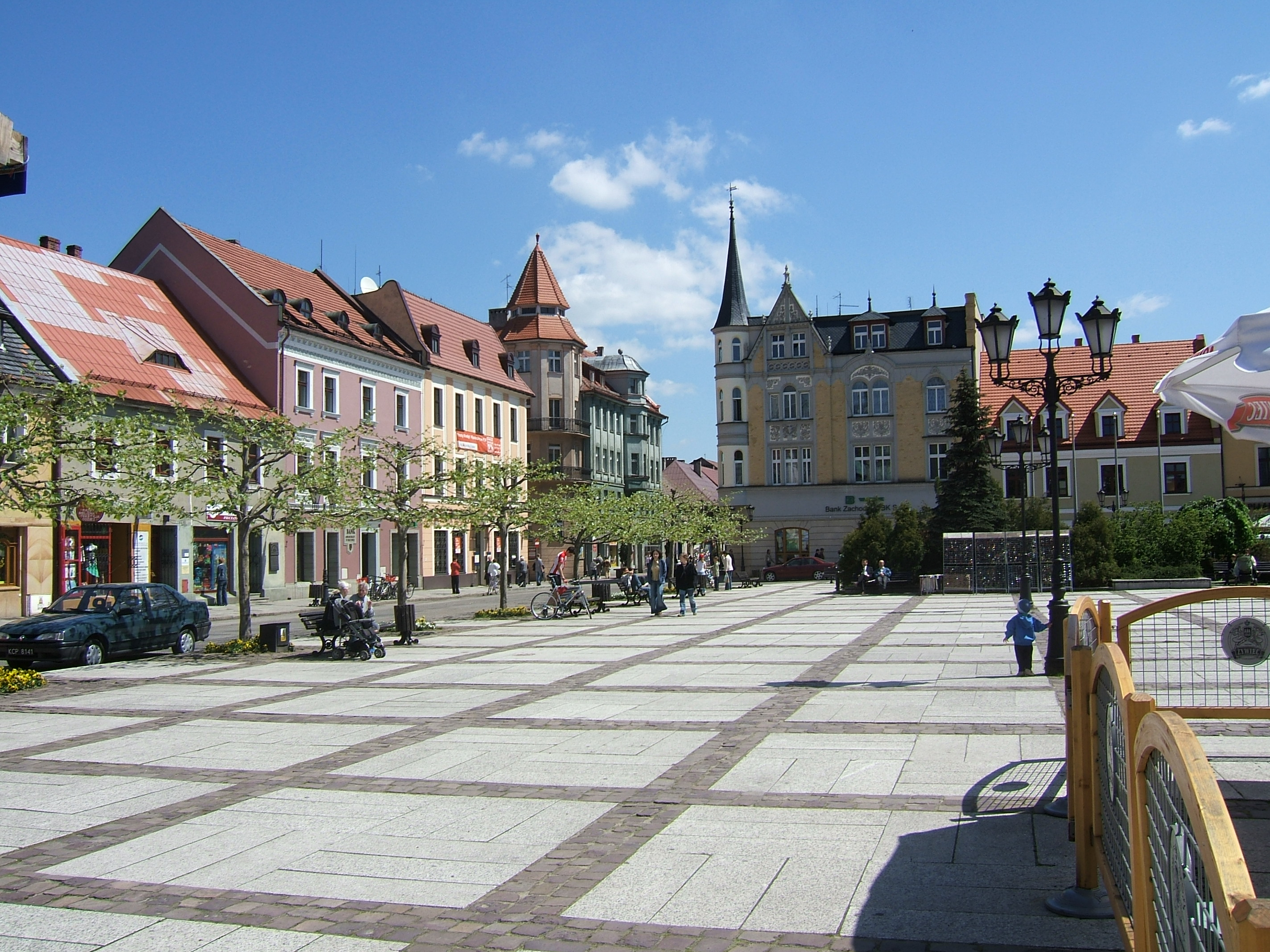

Origin
- Language: German
- Meaning: 1. from (Polish: Pszczyna), Silesia, German or Jewish surname; See also Heinrich XV, Duchy of Pless, principality of Anhalt-Pless; 2. from Plesná, the Czech Republic; 3. from Polish places "Pleśna"; 4. Plesse, nearby Bovenden; 5. Other place names - Pless. Germany Pleß or Von Pless German in origin variant of Pless, Plöß (Czech: Pláne)
- Region of origin: Poland (includes Austrian Galicia), Germany (especially Westphailia, southern Lowe Saxony), Czech Republic, Austria, Israel

Other names
- Variant forms: Pleßner, Plesner, Plešner, Platz, Pless, Plöss; not related but similar forms: Plesser, Plessers, Plössl

Plessner or Plesner is a German surname. Notable people with the surname include:

- Clementine Plessner, née Folkmann (1855-1943), Jewish Austrian actress
- Helmuth (Karl Otto Gustav Bernhard) Plessner (1892-1985), German philosopher and sociologist of Jewish descent
- Abraham Plessner (1900-1961), Jewish Polish-Russian mathematician

== Plesner ==
- Yohanan Plesner (born 1972), Israeli politician
- The Plesner Fragment, a parchment page from c. 1275

== Pleß ==
- Helmut Pleß (2 November 1918 – 25 December 1999) was a highly decorated Leutnant in the Luftwaffe during World War II, and a recipient of the Knight's Cross of the Iron Cross.
- A mountain in Germany.

== Platz ==
Old German form of the surname Pless.
