= Plyos =

Plyos may refer to:

- Plyometrics, or jump training
- Plyos, Ivanovo Oblast, a town in Russia

== See also ==
- Ples (disambiguation)
- Pleš (disambiguation)
