= Plesná (river) =

River in the Czech Republic and Germany

Plesná Fleißenbach
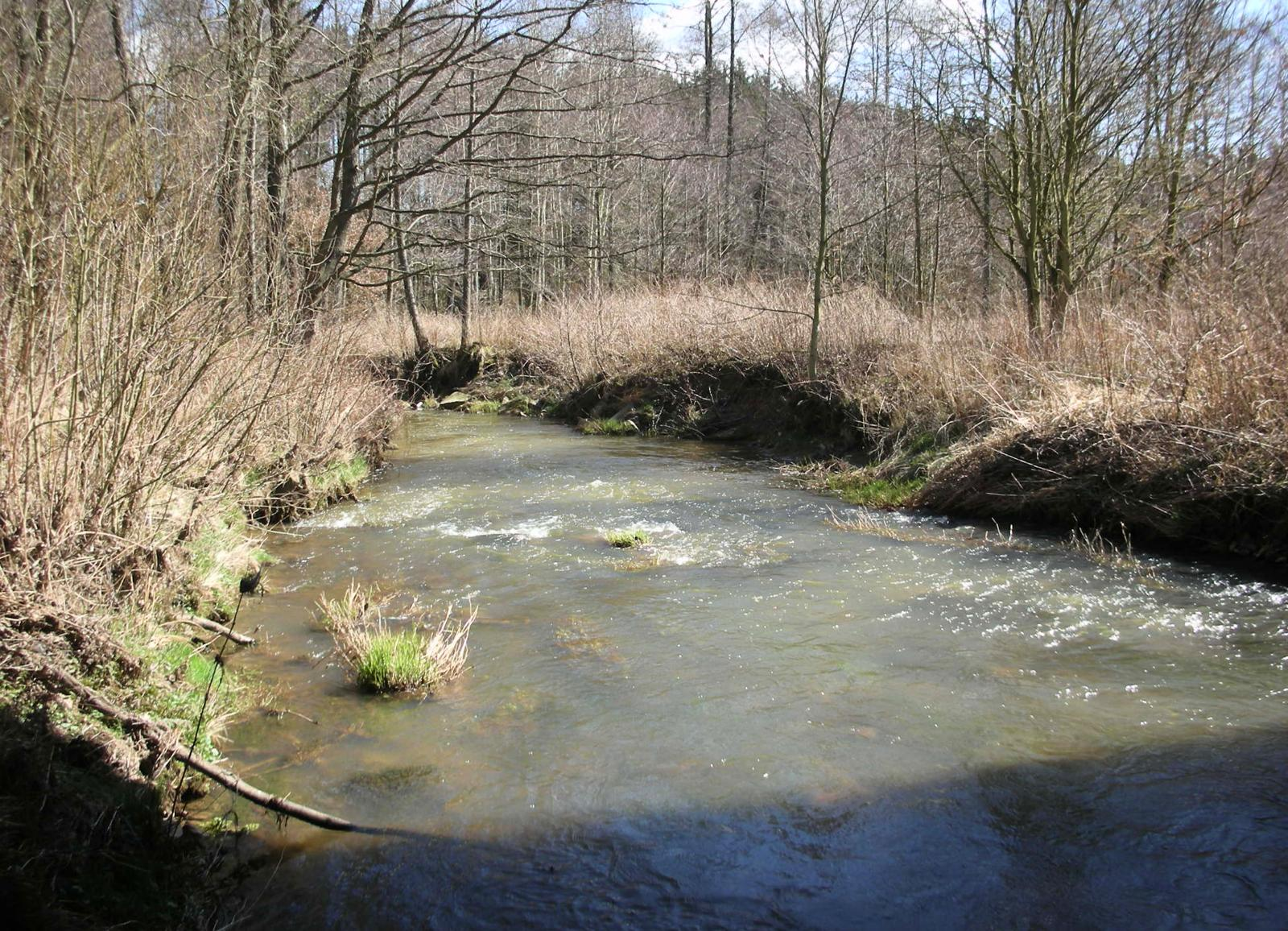
- The Plesná in Nebanice-Hartoušov

Location
- Countries: Czech Republic; Germany
- Regions/ States: Karlovy Vary; Saxony

Physical characteristics
- Source
  - location: Bad Brambach, Fichtel Mountains
  - coordinates: 50°11′38″N 12°17′22″E
  - elevation: 701 m (2,300 ft)
- Mouth
  - location: Ohře
  - coordinates: 50°6′45″N 12°27′51″E
  - elevation: 420 m (1,380 ft)
- Length: 29.1 km (18.1 mi)
- Basin size: 112.6 km^{2} (43.5 sq mi)
- Discharge
  - average: 0.99 m^{3}/s (35 cu ft/s) near estuary

Basin features
- Progression: Ohře→ Elbe→ North Sea

The Plesná (German: Fleißenbach) is a river in the Czech Republic and Germany. It flows through Saxony in Germany and through the Karlovy Vary Region. It is a left tributary of the Ohře River. It is 29.1 km (18.1 mi) long.

== Etymology ==
The name Plesná is probably derived from the Old Czech adjective blizní (i.e. 'close', 'nearby') and refers to the confluence with the Ohře, which is very close to the confluence of the Ohře with the Sázek Stream (so the river is "close to another stream").

== Characteristic ==
The Plesná originates in the territory of Bad Brambach in the Fichtel Mountains at an elevation of 701 m (2,300 ft) and flows to Nebanice, where it enters the Ohře River at an elevation of 420 m (1,380 ft). It is 29.1 km (18.1 mi) long, of which 27.0 km (16.8 mi) is in the Czech Republic (including the 2.2 km (1.4 mi) long sections on the Czech–German state border). Its drainage basin has an area of 112.6 km^{2} (43.5 sq mi).

The longest tributaries of the Plesná are:

Tributary	Length (km)	Side
Lubinka	12.2	left
Pstruhový potok	9.2	left

== Course ==
The river originates in the territory of Bad Brambach in Germany, then it follows the border between Bad Brambach and Aš, crosses the territory of Bad Brambach and then continues through the municipal territories of Plesná, Nový Kostel, Křižovatka, Milhostov and Nebanice in the Czech Republic.

== Fauna ==
Species of animals that live in and near the river include the burbot and Eurasian otter.

== See also ==
- List of rivers of the Czech Republic
- List of rivers of Saxony
