= Mira Mladějovská =

Czech art historian and archivist (1899–1969)

- Born: 3 March 1899; Prague, Bohemia, Austria-Hungary
- Died: 9 January 1969 (aged 69); Prague, Czechoslovakia
- Occupations: Art historian, Archivist
- Known for: director of the Museum and Archives in Cheb

Mira Mladějovská (3 March 1899 – 9 January 1969) was a Czech art historian and director of the Museum and Archives in Cheb.

== Life ==
Mira Mladějovská was born 3 March 1899 in Prague. Sher was the daughter of medical doctor Vladislav Mladějovský (born 1866 in Prague; died 1935), professor of hydrotherapy at Charles University in Prague and spa doctor in Mariánské Lázně. She studied art history at the Faculty of Arts of Charles University in Prague, received a doctorate in philosophy, and pursued an academic career.

After the end of World War II, Mladějovská took over the management of the Town Museum and Archives in Cheb from Jan Kobin, who had been appointed director in mid-1945. She succeeded Heribert Sturm, who had fled to Bavaria as a refugee. She managed an art gallery in the Cheb Town Hall in cooperation with the National Gallery Prague and the painter Bojmír Hutta.

== Cataloguing cultural monuments ==
Mladějovská compiled a bibliography and catalogue of cultural monuments in České Budějovice and the Egerland region. This catalogue and her work promoted the organisation of the preservation and restoration of these monuments. She was the editor of the book series Chebské pověsti ('Cheb legends'), published by the Cheb Regional Council. She also published articles from the Česká archival sources on the incomplete poetic legend of Agnes of Bohemia, a nun from Prague and founder of the Order of the Knights of the Cross with the Red Star, and Lord Hroznata of Ovnice, founder of the Chotěšov Abbey near Plzeň by the Premonstratensian order.

== Death ==
In 1962, in cooperation with the National Gallery Prague, Mladějovská founded the State Gallery of Fine Arts in Cheb and collaborated with its director, Bojmír Hutta, until her death. She spent the last years of her life in Milíkov near Mariánské Lázně. She died in Prague on 9 January 1969.

== Works ==
- Bibliografie Chebska. Cheb: Okresní rada osvětová. 1948.
- Legenda o blahoslavené Anežce: Chebské zlomky. Prague. 1948.
- Hroznatův zázrak. Cheb: Okresní rada osvětová. 1948.
