= Křižovatka =

- Municipality
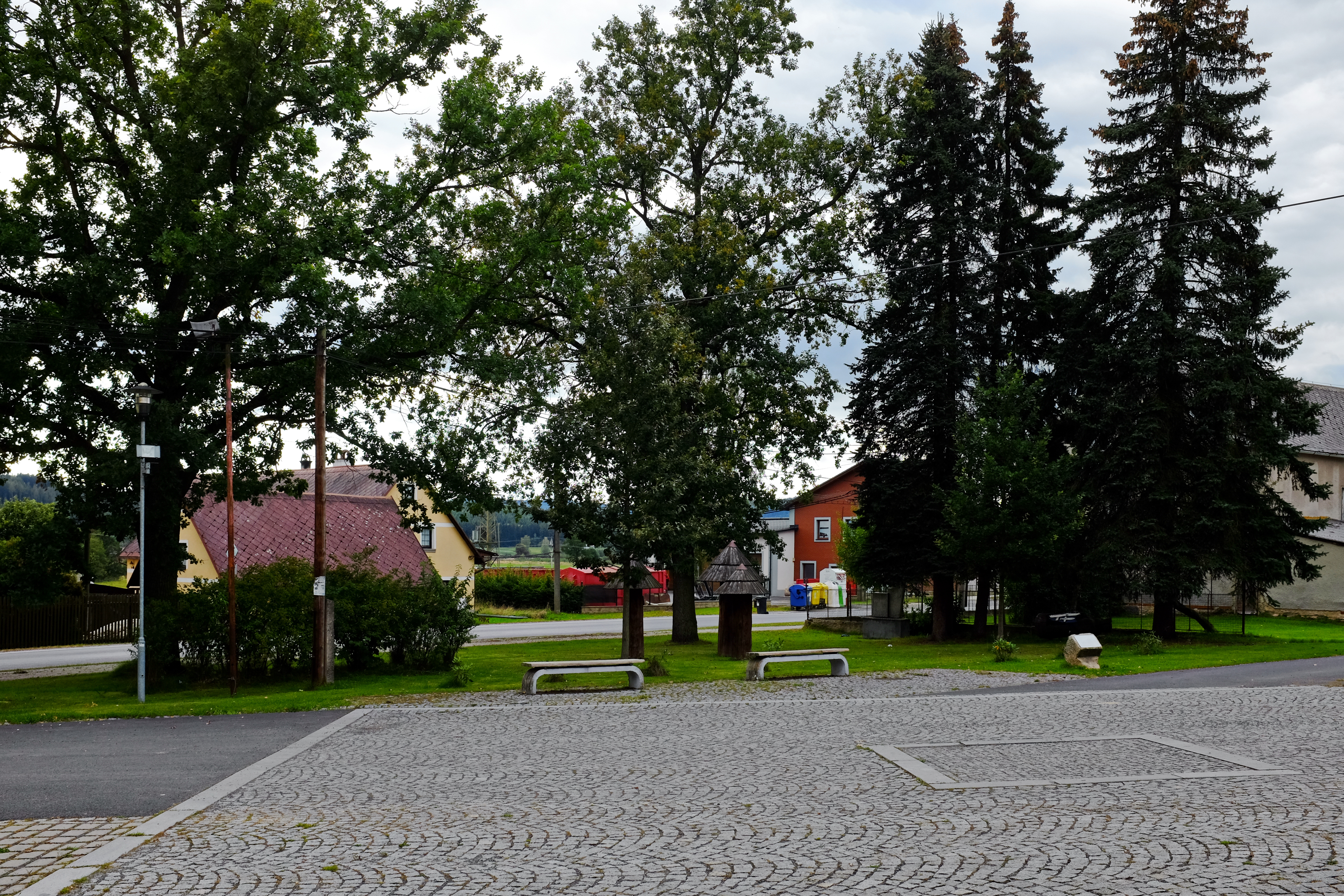
- Centre of Křižovatka

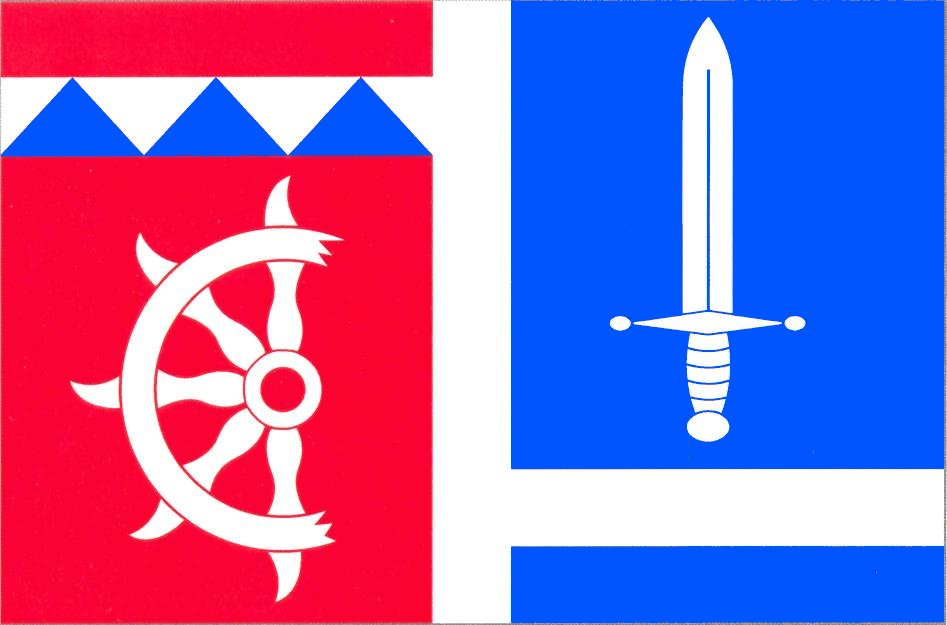
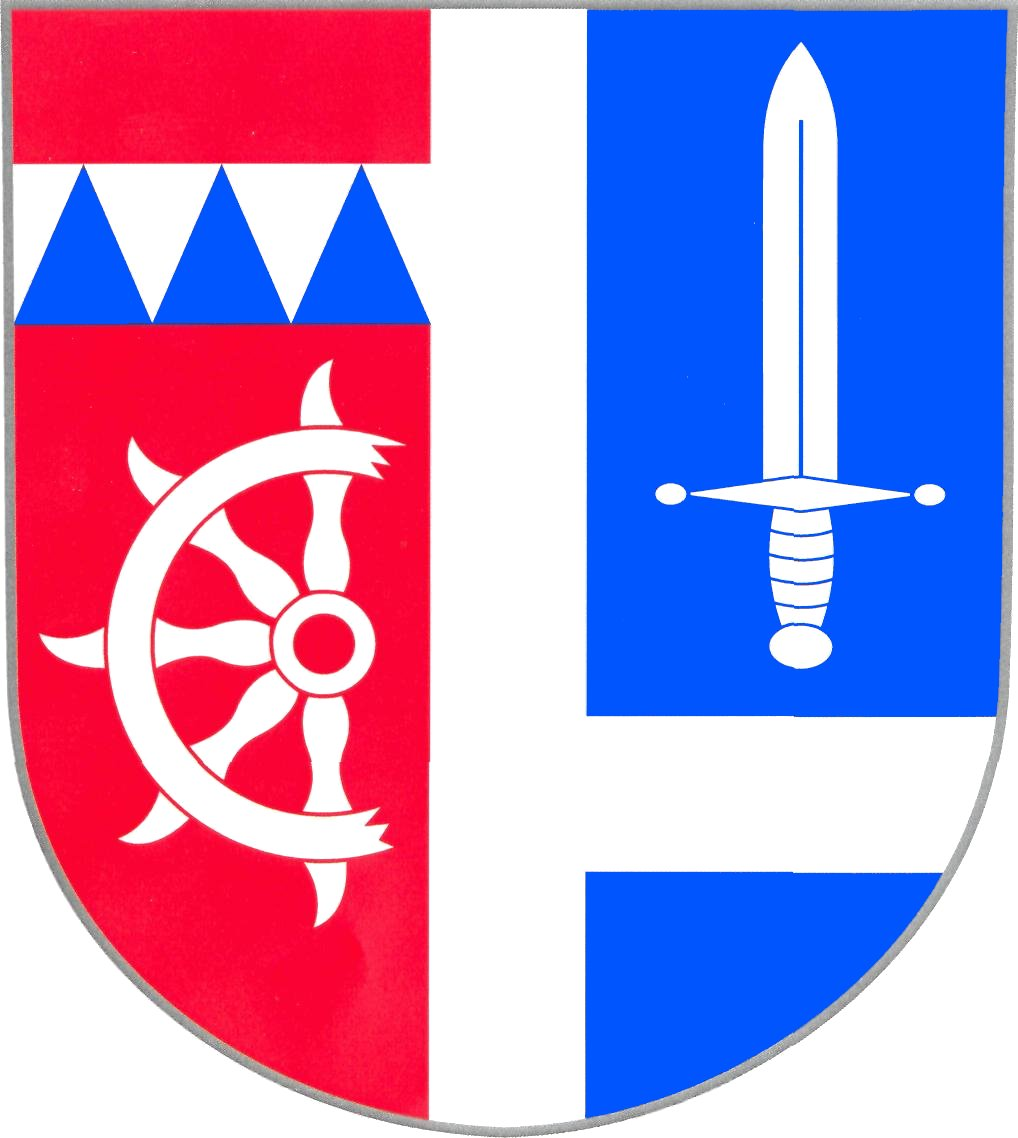
- Flag Coat of arms

- Location in the Czech Republic
- Coordinates: 50°11′39″N 12°23′35″E
- Country: Czech Republic
- Region: Karlovy Vary
- District: Cheb
- First mentioned: 1322

Area
  - Total: 14.13 km^{2} (5.46 sq mi)
- Elevation: 473 m (1,552 ft)

Population (2026-01-01)
  - Total: 261
  - Density: 18.5/km^{2} (47.8/sq mi)
- Time zone: UTC+1 (CET)
  - Summer (DST): UTC+2 (CEST)
- Postal code: 351 34
- Website: www.obeckrizovatka.cz

Křižovatka (German: Klinghart) is a municipality and village in Cheb District in the Karlovy Vary Region of the Czech Republic. It has about 300 inhabitants.

== Administrative division ==
Křižovatka consists of two municipal parts (in brackets population according to the 2021 census):

- Křižovatka (224)
- Nová Ves (38)

== Etymology ==
The original German name Klinghart consisted of two parts: kling ('to sound') and hart ('harsh'). It was originally a name for the local harsh landscape. In 1948, the municipality was renamed to Křižovatka, literally meaning 'crossroads' in Czech.

== Geography ==
Křižovatka is located about 13 kilometres (8 mi) north of Cheb and 33 km (21 mi) west of Karlovy Vary. It lies in an agricultural landscape in the Cheb Basin. The highest point is at 495 m (1,624 ft) above sea level. The stream Lužní potok flows through the municipality. The Plesná River flows along the northern and eastern municipal border.

== History ==
The first written mention of Křižovatka is from 1322. The village was damaged during the Hussite Wars and during the Thirty Years' War. Křižovatka experienced its greatest boom in the 1930s, when the village proper had over 600 inhabitants and the municipality also included the villages of Šneky (now an integral part of Plesná) and Velký Luh.

== Demographics ==
Historical population

Year	Pop.	±%
1869	994	—
1880	977	−1.7%
1890	875	−10.4%
1900	838	−4.2%
1910	917	+9.4%

Year	Pop.	±%
1921	864	−5.8%
1930	944	+9.3%
1950	401	−57.5%
1961	327	−18.5%
1970	304	−7.0%

Year	Pop.	±%
1980	286	−5.9%
1991	261	−8.7%
2001	266	+1.9%
2011	258	−3.0%
2021	262	+1.6%

Source: Censuses

== Transport ==
The Cheb–Luby railway crosses the municipal territory, but there is no train station. The municipality is served by the station in neighbouring Velký Luh.

== Sights ==
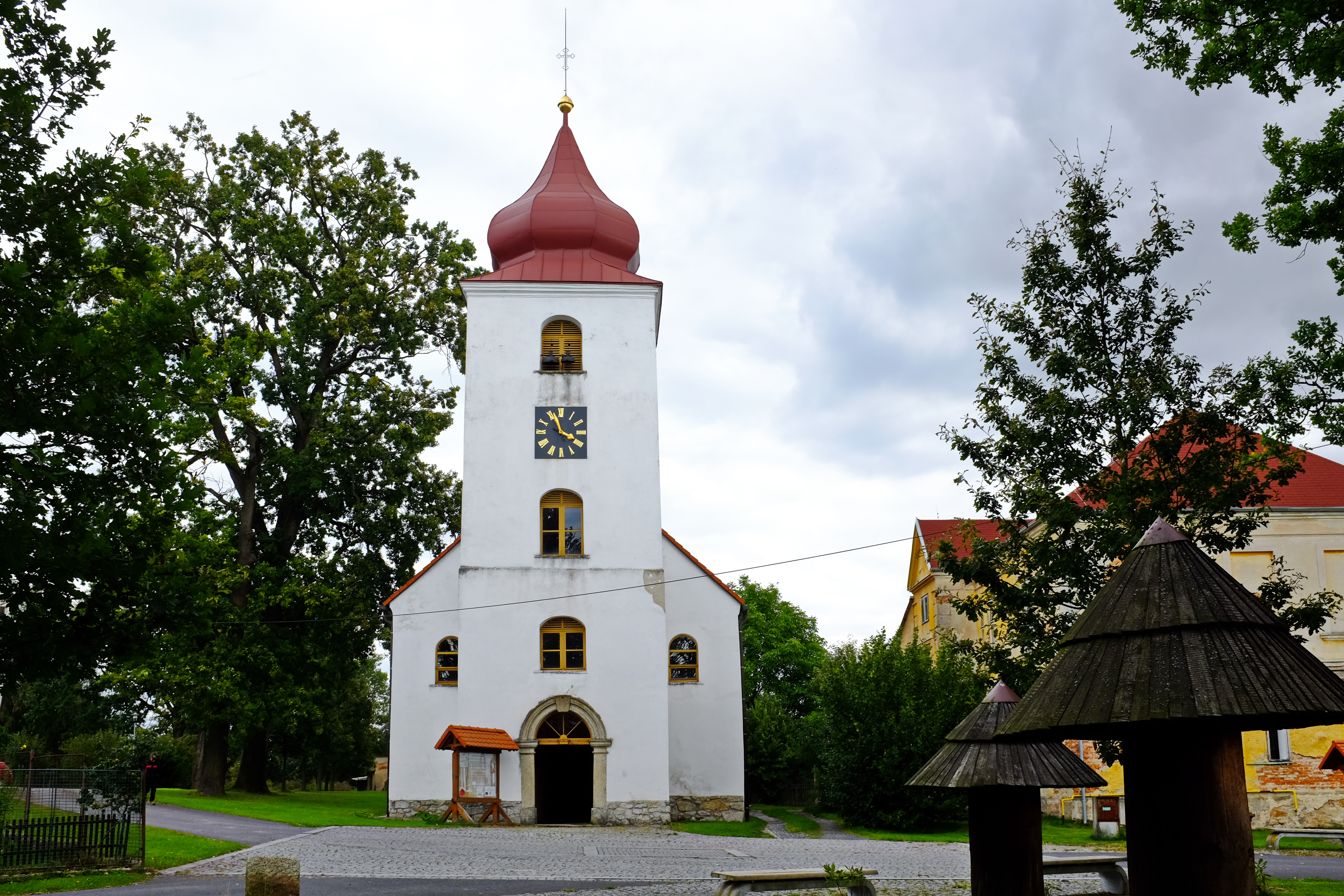
Church of Saint Catherine

The main landmark of Křižovatka is the Church of Saint Catherine. It was originally built in the Gothic style around 1213 and is among the oldest churches in the region. In 1812–1813, it was rebuilt to its present form and a new tower was added.
