= Milíkov =

Milíkov may refer to places in the Czech Republic:

- Milíkov (Cheb District), a municipality and village in the Karlovy Vary Region
- Milíkov (Frýdek-Místek District), a municipality and village in the Moravian-Silesian Region
- Milíkov, a village and part of Černá (Žďár nad Sázavou District) in the Vysočina Region
- Milíkov, a village and part of Stříbro in the Plzeň Region
- Milíkov, a village and part of Vacov in the South Bohemian Region
