= Plesna =

Plesná or Pleśna may refer to places:

== Czech Republic ==
- Plesná, a town in the Karlovy Vary Region
- Plesná (river), a river in the Czech Republic and Germany
- Plesná (Ostrava), a suburb of Ostrava
- Lackenberg/Plesná, a mountain in the Bohemian Forest range

== Poland ==
- Gmina Pleśna, a gmina in Lesser Poland Voivodeship
- Pleśna, Lesser Poland Voivodeship
- Pleśna, West Pomeranian Voivodeship
