= Hleve =

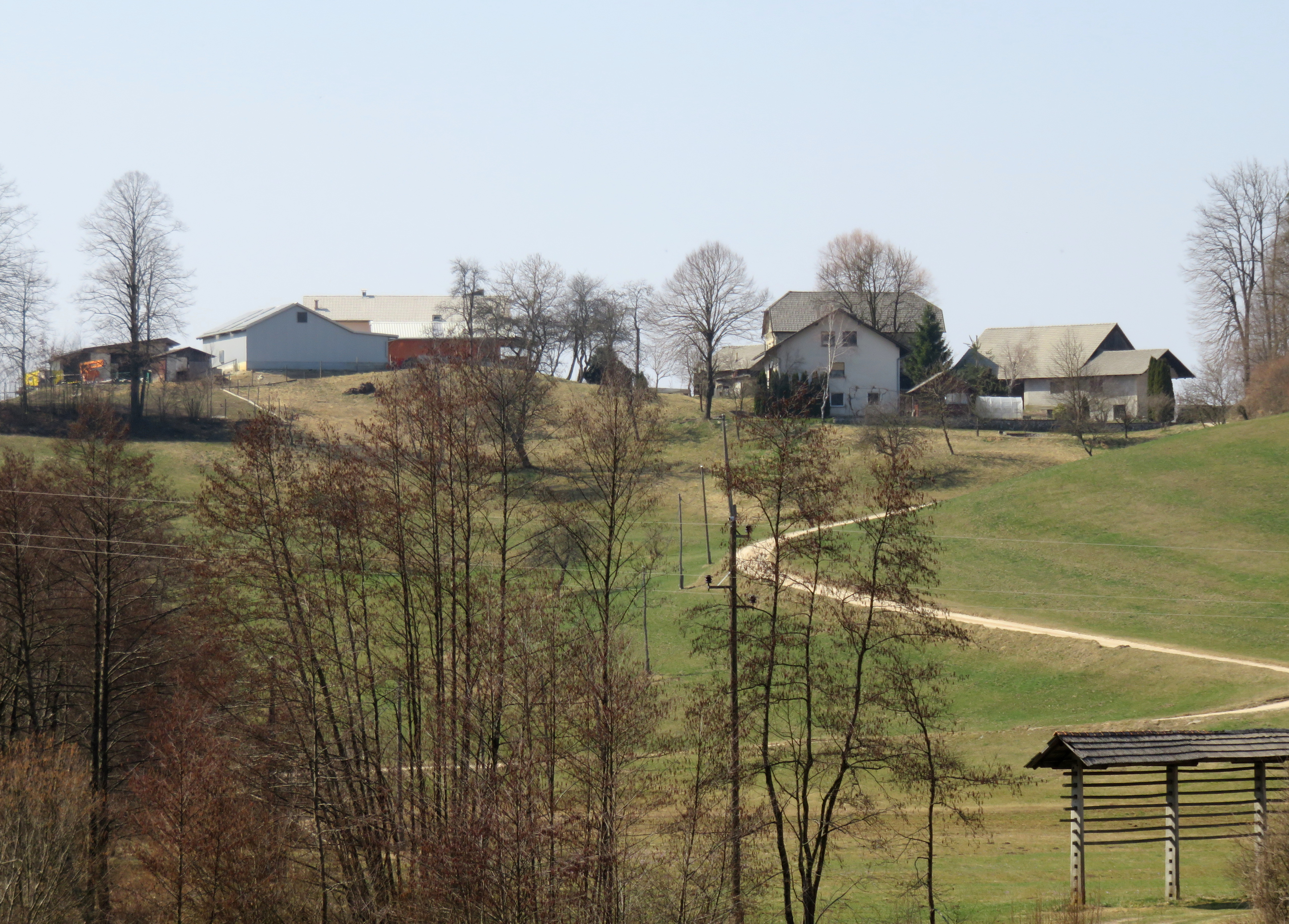

- Location in Slovenia
- Coordinates: 46°8′24″N 14°47′44″E
- Country: Slovenia
- Traditional region: Upper Carniola
- Statistical region: Central Slovenia
- Municipality: Moravče
- Elevation: 425 m (1,394 ft)

Hleve (Slovene pronunciation: [ˈxleːʋɛ]) is a former settlement in the Municipality of Moravče in central Slovenia. It is now part of the village of Ples. The area is part of the traditional region of Upper Carniola. The municipality is now included in the Central Slovenia Statistical Region.

== Geography ==
Hleve lies in the eastern part of the village of Ples, north of the main road from Moravče to Mlinše.

== History ==
Hleve had a population of 16 in three houses in 1900. Hleve was annexed by Peče in 1952, ending its existence as an independent settlement. It was later reassigned to the neighboring village of Ples.
