= Zgornja Dobrava, Moravče =

Zgornja Dobrava
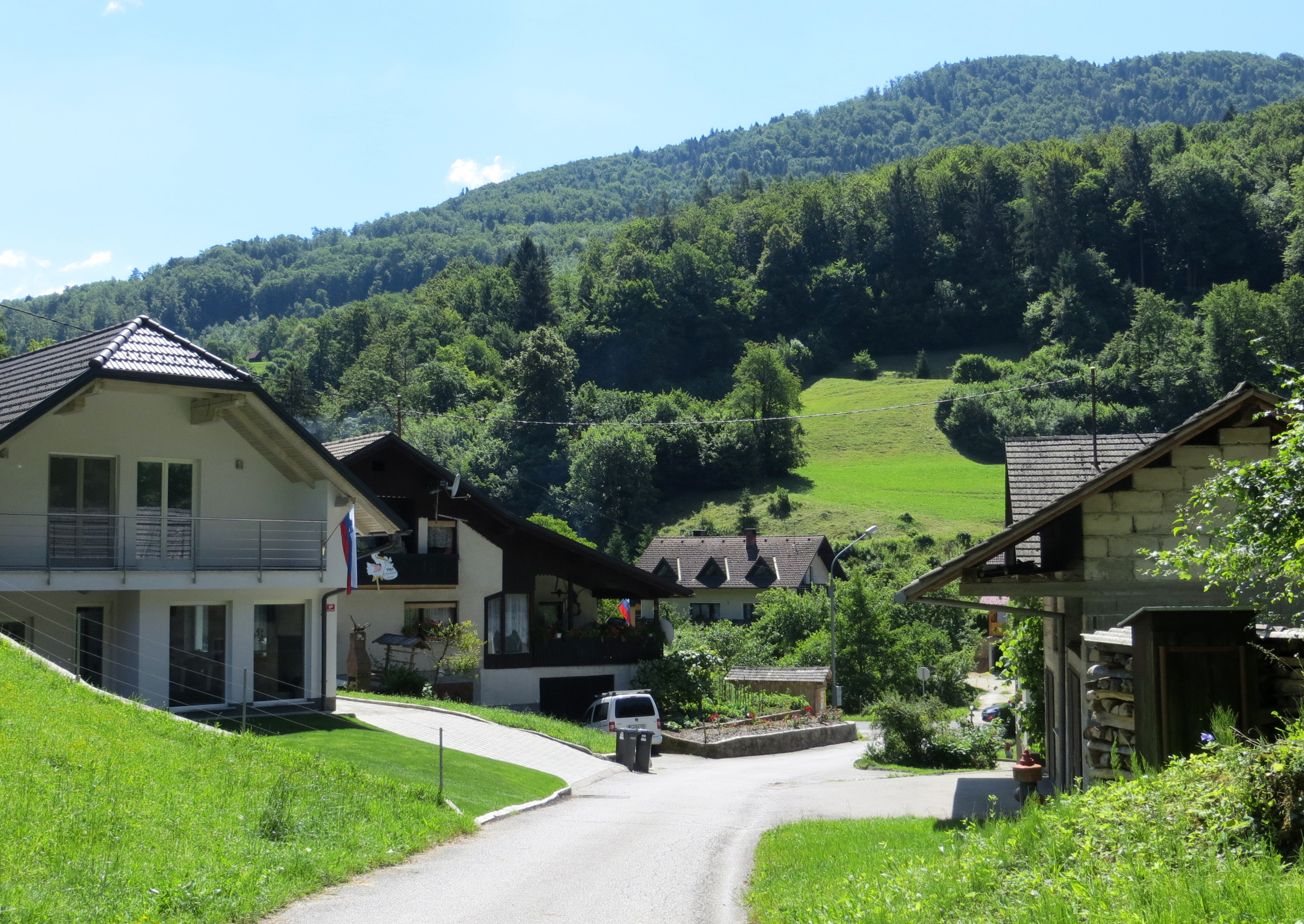

- Location in Slovenia
- Coordinates: 46°8′11.89″N 14°46′33.93″E
- Country: Slovenia
- Traditional region: Upper Carniola
- Statistical region: Central Slovenia
- Municipality: Moravče

Area
  - Total: 0.39 km^{2} (0.15 sq mi)
- Elevation: 405 m (1,329 ft)

Population (2002)
  - Total: 48
- Postal code: 1251

Zgornja Dobrava (pronounced [ˈzɡoːɾnja dɔˈbɾaːʋa]; German: Oberdobrawa) is a small settlement east of Moravče in central Slovenia. The area is part of the traditional region of Upper Carniola. It is now included with the rest of the municipality in the Central Slovenia Statistical Region.

== Name ==
Zgornja Dobrava was attested in historical sources as Dobraw in 1386 and 1429.

== History ==
Until 1953, when it was administratively separated and made a village in its own right, the neighboring village of Ples was a hamlet of Zgornja Dobrava.
