= Pless =

Pleß or Pless may refer to:

== Places ==
- Pleß, a municipality in the district of Unterallgäu in Bavaria, Germany
- Pszczyna (German: Pleß), a town in southern Poland
  - Duchy of Pless, a historic territory in Silesia
- Pleß (mountain), a mountain in Thuringia, Germany

== People ==
- Daisy, Princess of Pless (1873–1943), noted society beauty in the Edwardian period
- Artūrs Toms Plešs, (born 1992), Latvian politician
- Helmut Pleß, Knight's Cross of the Iron Cross recipient in 1944
- Kristian Pless (born 1981), Danish tennis player
- Leonie Pless (born 1988), German rower
- Rance Pless (1925–2017), American baseball player
- Stephen W. Pless (1939–1969), United States Medal of Honor recipient
- Vera Pless (1931–2020), American mathematician
- Willie Pless (born 1964), Canadian football player

== See also ==
- (including Pless)
- Ples (disambiguation)
- Pleš (disambiguation)
