= František Nedvěd =

Czech weightlifter (1950–2010)

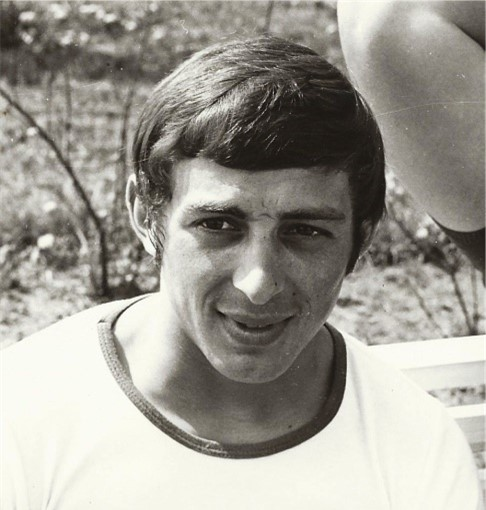
- František Nedvěd in 1970

Personal information
- Nationality: Czech
- Born: 27 October 1950 Plesná, Czechoslovakia
- Died: 27 February 2010 (aged 59) Plesná, Czech Republic
- Occupation: Profesionální vzpěrač
- Years active: 1973–1982
- Spouse: Milada Nedvědová

Sport
- Country: ČSSR
- Sport: Weightlifting

Achievements and titles
- Olympic finals: 1980, olympijské hry Moskva, 6.Místo
- World finals: Mistrovství Evropy- 1974 (Verona), 1975 (Moskva), 1978 (Havířov), 1981 (Lille) - 4X 6.Místo, Mistrovství světa- 1980 6.Místo
- National finals: Mistr ČSSR v letech 1972, 1973, 1976, 1980.
- Personal bests: Zasloužilý mistr sportu, Síň slávy ČSV

František Nedvěd (27 October 1950 – 27 February 2010) was a Czech weightlifter. He competed in the men's featherweight event at the 1980 Summer Olympics.
