= Ples =

Ples may refer to the following places:

- Ples, Bistrica ob Sotli, Slovenia
- Ples, Moravče, Slovenia
- Mrs. Ples, the popular nickname for a complete Australopithecus africanus skull

== See also ==
- Pleš (disambiguation)
- Pleß (disambiguation)
- Plyos, Ivanovo Oblast (Russian: Плёс), a town in Privolzhsky District of Ivanovo Oblast
