= Nebanice =

- Municipality
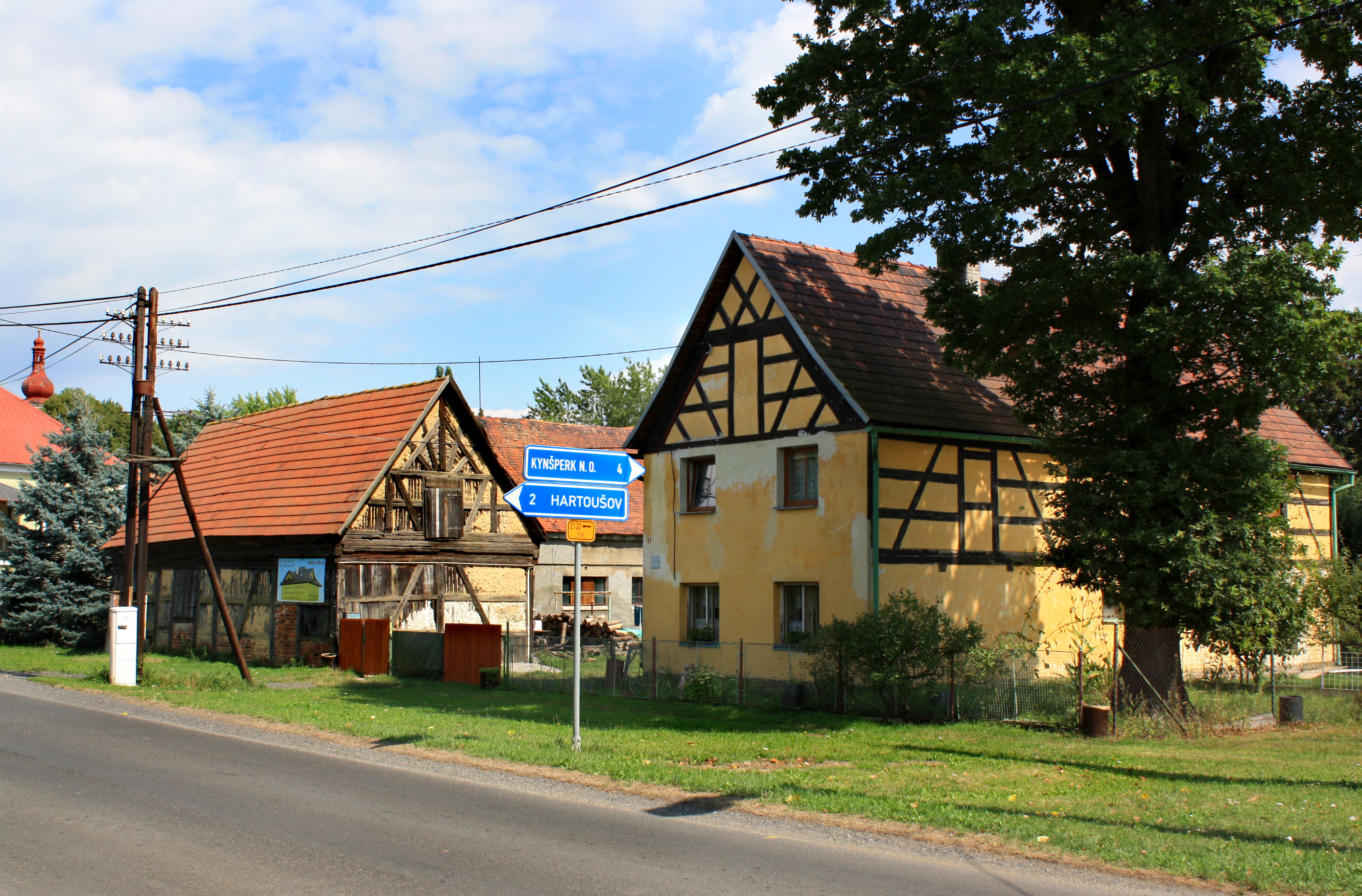
- Folk architecture in the village

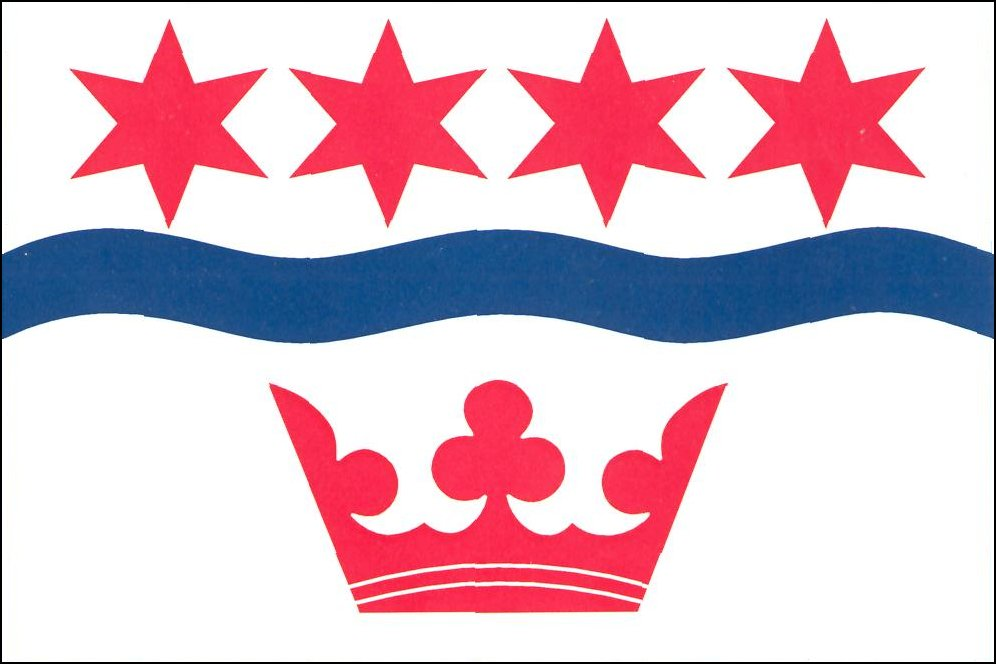
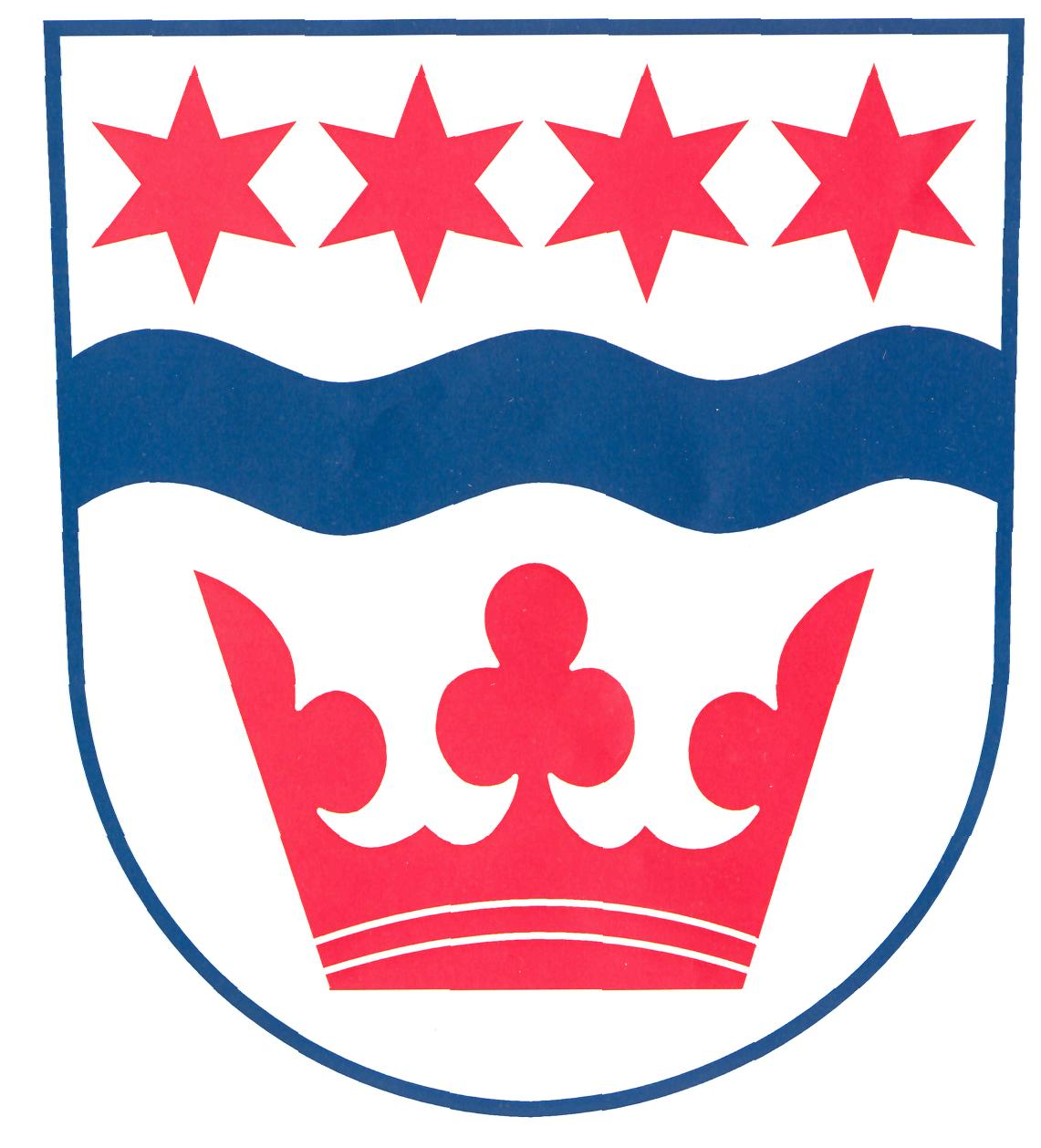
- Flag Coat of arms

- Location in the Czech Republic
- Coordinates: 50°6′55″N 12°28′19″E
- Country: Czech Republic
- Region: Karlovy Vary
- District: Cheb
- First mentioned: 1391

Area
  - Total: 9.39 km^{2} (3.63 sq mi)
- Elevation: 423 m (1,388 ft)

Population (2026-01-01)
  - Total: 320
  - Density: 34/km^{2} (88/sq mi)
- Time zone: UTC+1 (CET)
  - Summer (DST): UTC+2 (CEST)
- Postal code: 350 02
- Website: www.nebanice.cz

Nebanice (German: Nebanitz) is a municipality and village in Cheb District in the Karlovy Vary Region of the Czech Republic. It has about 300 inhabitants.

== Administrative division ==
Nebanice consists of two municipal parts (in brackets population according to the 2021 census):

- Nebanice (320)
- Hartoušov (23)

== Etymology ==
The origin of the name Nebanice is uncertain. There is a theory that the initial name of the village was Nebažnice and it was composed of the negative prefix ne- and the Czech word bažina ('bog'), referring to the location of the village behind a bog.

== Geography ==
Nebanice is located about 8 kilometres (5 mi) northeast of Cheb and 30 km (19 mi) southwest of Karlovy Vary. It lies in a flat agricultural landscape in the Cheb Basin. It is situated on the left bank of the Ohře River, at its confluence with the Plesná River and Sázek Stream.

== History ==
The first written mention of Nebanice is from 1391. The owners of the village changed often. The last owner of Nebanice before the municipality became independent was the town of Cheb.

== Demographics ==
Historical population

Year	Pop.	±%
1869	390	—
1880	401	+2.8%
1890	412	+2.7%
1900	355	−13.8%
1910	377	+6.2%

Year	Pop.	±%
1921	374	−0.8%
1930	435	+16.3%
1950	208	−52.2%
1961	207	−0.5%
1970	210	+1.4%

Year	Pop.	±%
1980	263	+25.2%
1991	318	+20.9%
2001	311	−2.2%
2011	347	+11.6%
2021	343	−1.2%

Source: Censuses

== Transport ==
Nebanice is located on the railway lines Plzeň–Karlovy Vary and Cheb–Kadaň.

== Sights ==
The main landmark of Nebanice is the Church of Saint Oswald. It was built in the Baroque style in 1716, when it replaced an older Gothic church.
