= Dolní Žandov =

- Municipality
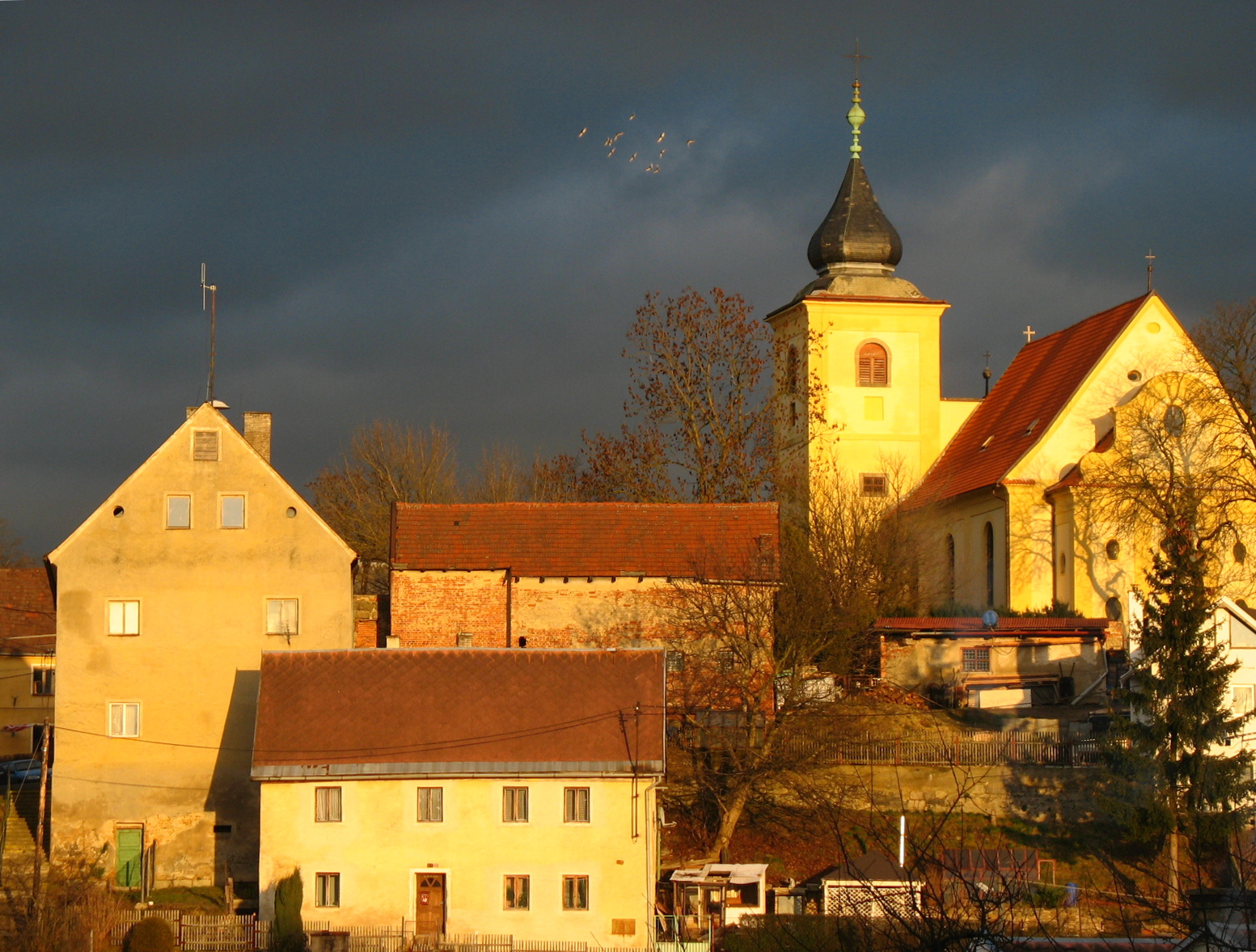
- Church of Saint Michael

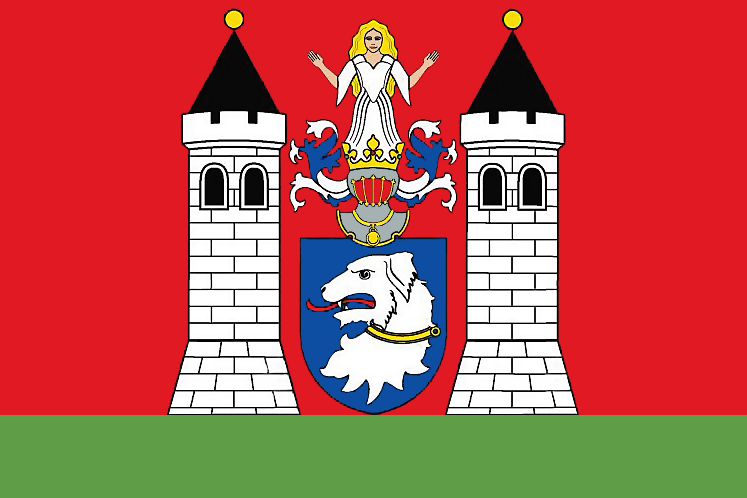
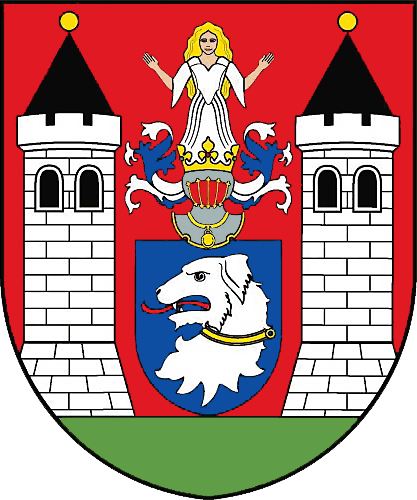
- Flag Coat of arms

- Location in the Czech Republic
- Coordinates: 50°1′5″N 12°33′4″E
- Country: Czech Republic
- Region: Karlovy Vary
- District: Cheb
- First mentioned: 1197

Area
  - Total: 41.34 km^{2} (15.96 sq mi)
- Elevation: 540 m (1,770 ft)

Population (2026-01-01)
  - Total: 1,186
  - Density: 28.69/km^{2} (74.30/sq mi)
- Time zone: UTC+1 (CET)
  - Summer (DST): UTC+2 (CEST)
- Postal code: 354 93
- Website: www.dolnizandov.cz

Dolní Žandov (German: Unter Sandau) is a municipality and village in Cheb District in the Karlovy Vary Region of the Czech Republic. It has about 1,200 inhabitants.

== Administrative division ==
Dolní Žandov consists of five municipal parts (in brackets population according to the 2021 census):

- Dolní Žandov (889)
- Horní Žandov (61)
- Podlesí (40)
- Salajna (66)
- Úbočí (76)

== Etymology ==
The initial German name Sandau was derived from the German words Sand ('sand') and Aue ('meadow'). The Czech name was derived from the German name. The prefix Dolní ('lower') distinguished the village from Horní Žandov ('upper Žandov', today a part of Dolní Žandov).

== Geography ==
Dolní Žandov is located about 13 kilometres (8 mi) southeast of Cheb and 32 km (20 mi) southwest of Karlovy Vary.

Most of the municipal territory lies in the Podčeskoleská Hills, only the northeastern part lies in the Slavkov Forest. The hill Lesný, which is at 983 m (3,225 ft) the highest peak of the whole Slavkov Forest, is located in the municipality. A large part of Dolní Žandov belongs to the Slavkov Forest Protected Landscape Area.

== History ==
The first written mention of Dolní Žandov is from 1197, when Duke Bretislav III donated the village to the newly established Teplá Abbey. Between 1261 and 1278, when the area was owned by King Ottokar II, Dolní Žandov was promoted to a town. During the fights between Charles IV and Louis IV in 1347, the town was destroyed. In 1370, King Charles IV pledged the town to Boreš of Osek. In 1374, he obtained permission to demolish the rest of the town and found a new one nearby, but in the end this did not happen and Dolní Žandov was gradually restored in its current location. From that time until the end of feudalism in 1848, Dolní Žandov belonged to the Kynžvart estate.

After World War II, the German-speaking population was expelled and Dolní Žandov ceased to be a town. In the following decades, there was economic stagnation and the devastation of the architecturally valuable buildings.

== Demographics ==
Historical population

Year	Pop.	±%
1869	3,529	—
1880	3,410	−3.4%
1890	3,196	−6.3%
1900	2,964	−7.3%
1910	3,068	+3.5%

Year	Pop.	±%
1921	2,912	−5.1%
1930	2,979	+2.3%
1950	1,258	−57.8%
1961	1,102	−12.4%
1970	1,022	−7.3%

Year	Pop.	±%
1980	967	−5.4%
1991	1,152	+19.1%
2001	1,187	+3.0%
2011	1,161	−2.2%
2021	1,132	−2.5%

Source: Censuses

== Transport ==
The I/21 road, which connects the D5 and D6 motorways, runs through the municipality.

Dolní Žandov is located on the railway line Plzeň–Karlovy Vary.

== Sights ==
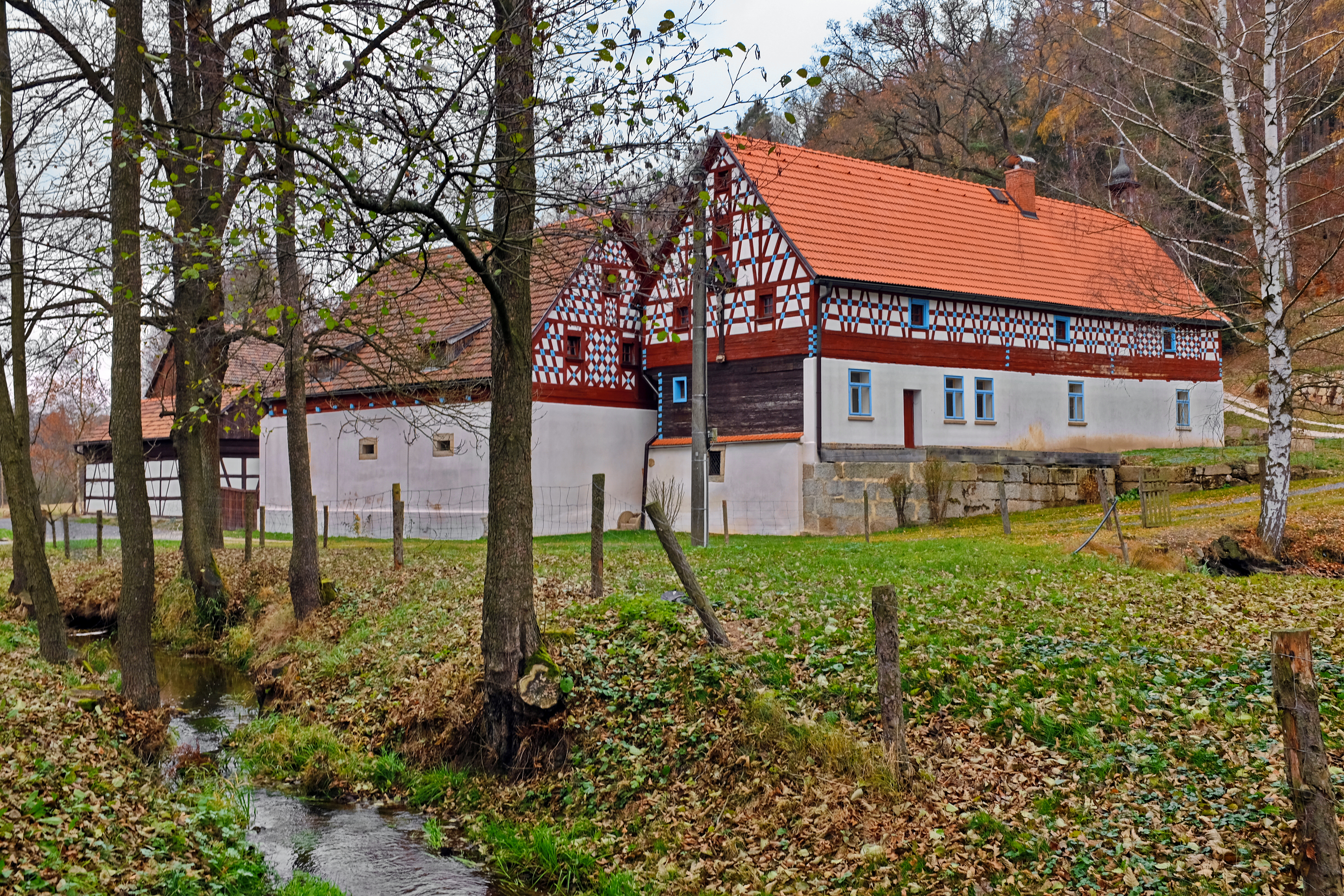
Salajna watermill

The main landmark of Dolní Žandov is the Church of Saint Michael. The originally Gothic building was rebuilt in the Baroque style in 1682.

In Podlesí is the Chapel of the Virgin Mary. This half-timbered chapel was built in 1931–1932 on the site of a burned chapel from the 17th century. It is a pilgrimage site.

The village of Salajna is protected as a village monument zone for its preserved examples of folk architecture typical for this region. An important monument of folk architecture is the watermill in Salajna. It was founded in the 17th century. The current appearance of the buildings with the half-timbered gables dates from the second half of the 18th century.
