= Ples, Moravče =

Ples
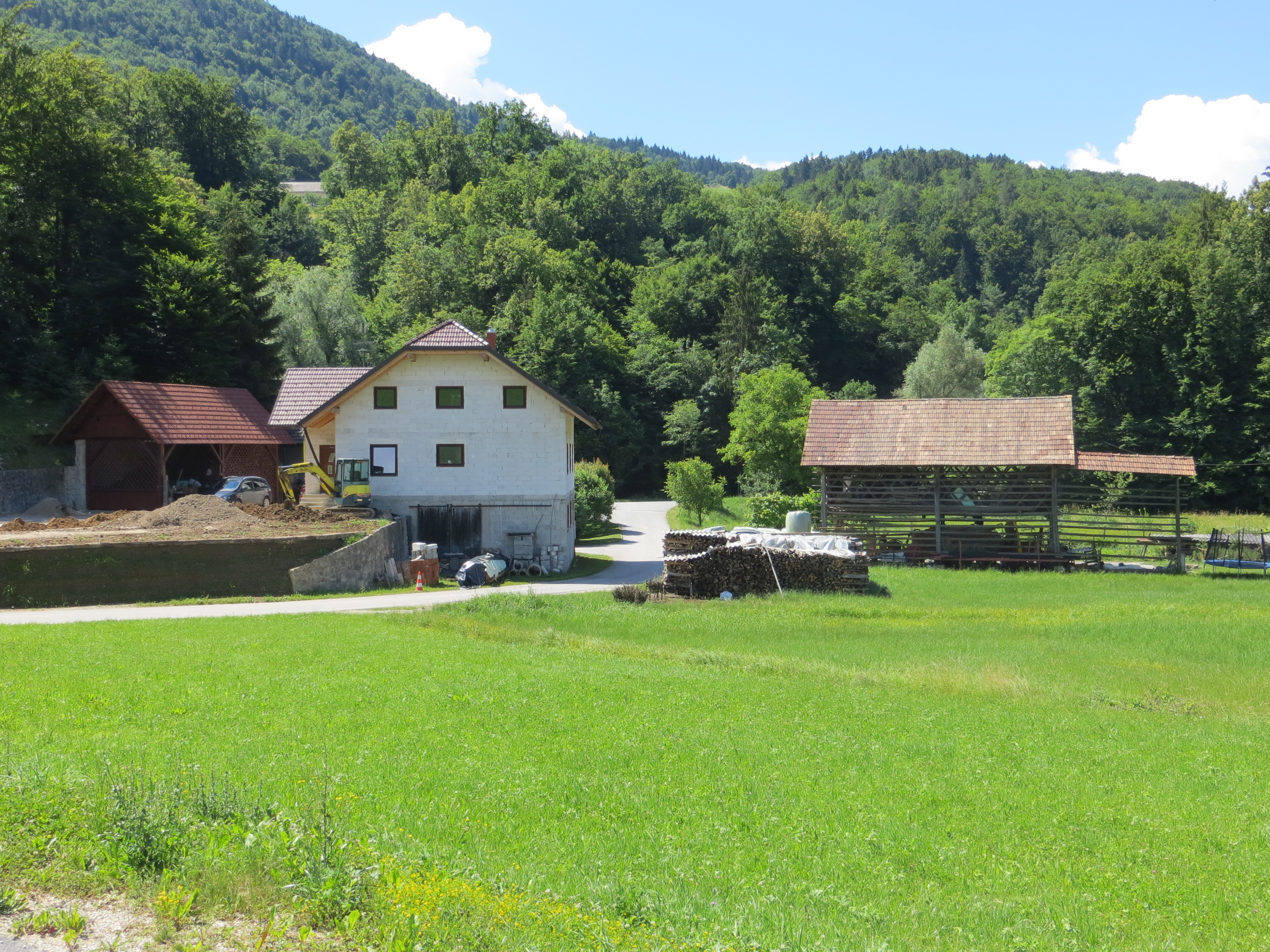

- Location in Slovenia
- Coordinates: 46°8′22.33″N 14°47′17.22″E
- Country: Slovenia
- Traditional region: Upper Carniola
- Statistical region: Central Slovenia
- Municipality: Moravče

Area
  - Total: 1.34 km^{2} (0.52 sq mi)
- Elevation: 432 m (1,417 ft)

Population (2002)
  - Total: 65
- Postal code: 1251

Ples (pronounced [ˈplɛs]) is a settlement in the Municipality of Moravče in central Slovenia. It lies east of Moravče on the main road to Izlake. The area is part of the traditional region of Upper Carniola. It is now included with the rest of the municipality in the Central Slovenia Statistical Region.

== Name ==
Ples was attested in historical sources as Pless in 1347, Plyess in 1355, and Plezz in 1383, among other spellings.

== History ==
Ples was a hamlet of Zgornja Dobrava until 1953, when it was administratively separated and made a village in its own right.
