= Milhostov =

- Municipality
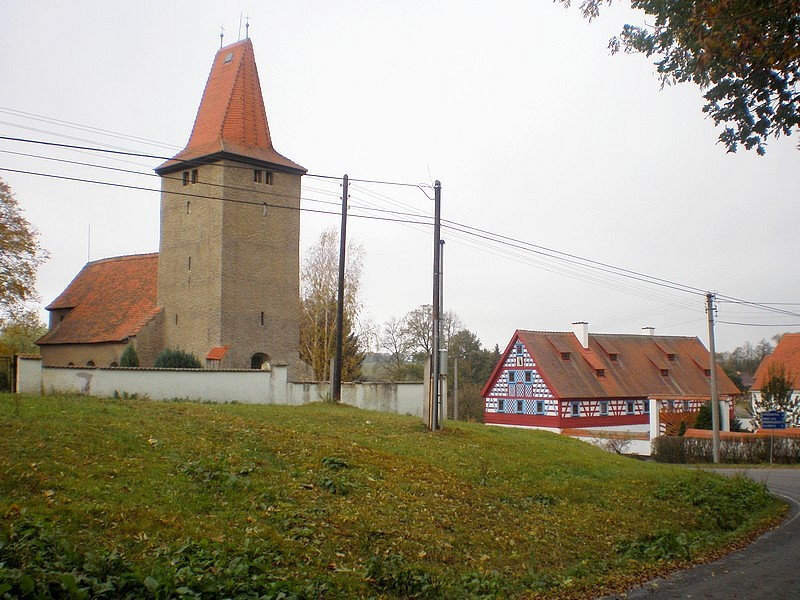
- Church of Saint Nicholas

- Flag Coat of arms

- Location in the Czech Republic
- Coordinates: 50°9′22″N 12°27′12″E
- Country: Czech Republic
- Region: Karlovy Vary
- District: Cheb
- First mentioned: 1219

Area
  - Total: 17.63 km^{2} (6.81 sq mi)
- Elevation: 441 m (1,447 ft)

Population (2026-01-01)
  - Total: 311
  - Density: 17.6/km^{2} (45.7/sq mi)
- Time zone: UTC+1 (CET)
  - Summer (DST): UTC+2 (CEST)
- Postal code: 350 02
- Website: www.milhostov.cz

Milhostov (German: Mühlessen) is a municipality and village in Cheb District in the Karlovy Vary Region of the Czech Republic. It has about 300 inhabitants.

== Administrative division ==
Milhostov consists of three municipal parts (in brackets population according to the 2021 census):

- Milhostov (260)
- Hluboká (38)
- Vackovec (21)

== Demographics ==
Historical population
Year	Pop.	±%
1869	904	—
1880	922	+2.0%
1890	861	−6.6%
1900	739	−14.2%
1910	810	+9.6%
1921	782	−3.5%
1930	810	+3.6%
1950	304	−62.5%
1961	323	+6.2%
1970	389	+20.4%
1980	341	−12.3%
1991	308	−9.7%
2001	322	+4.5%
2011	325	+0.9%
2021	319	−1.8%
Source: Censuses
