= Nový Kostel =

- Municipality
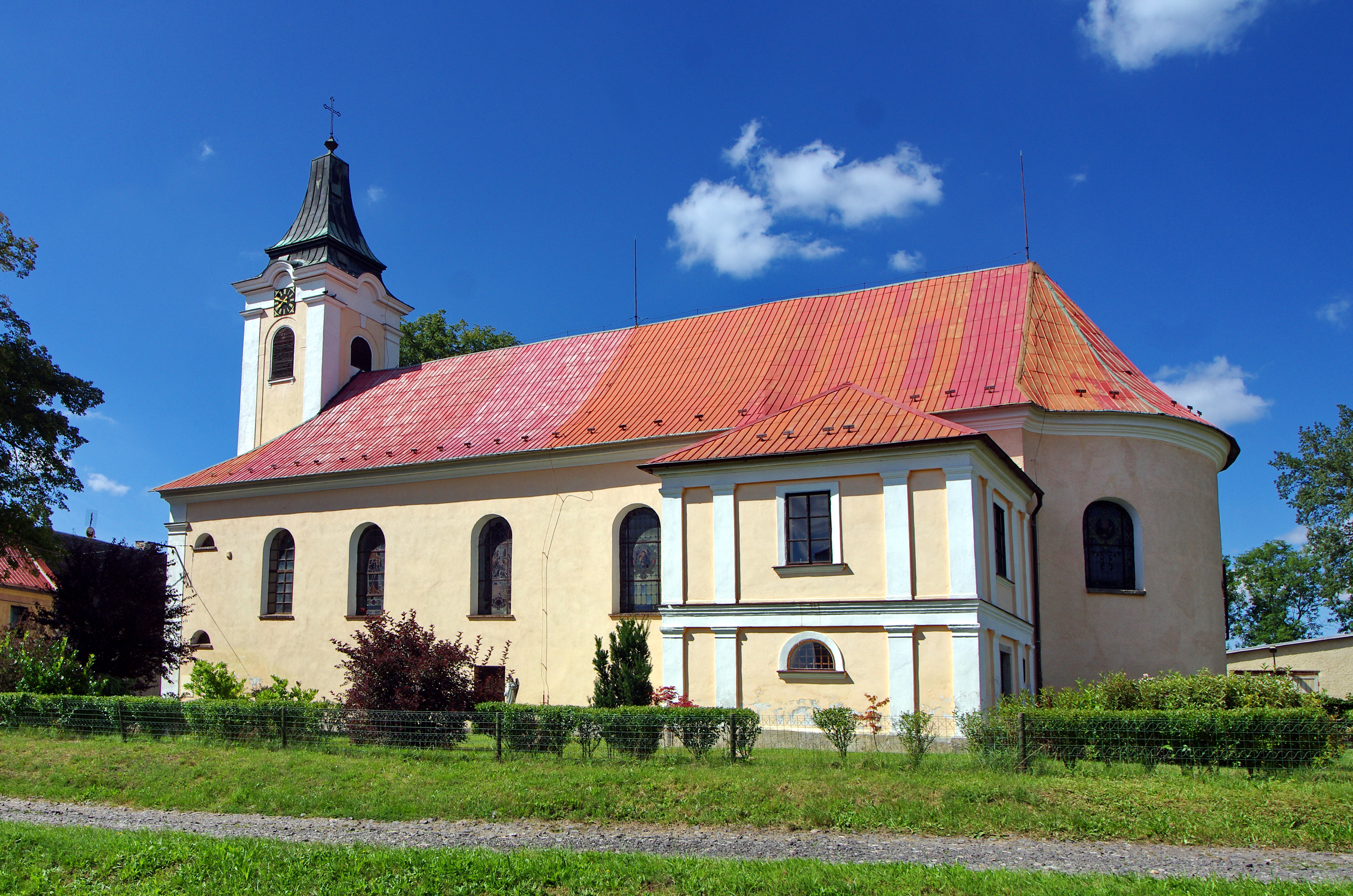
- Church of the Exaltation of the Holy Cross

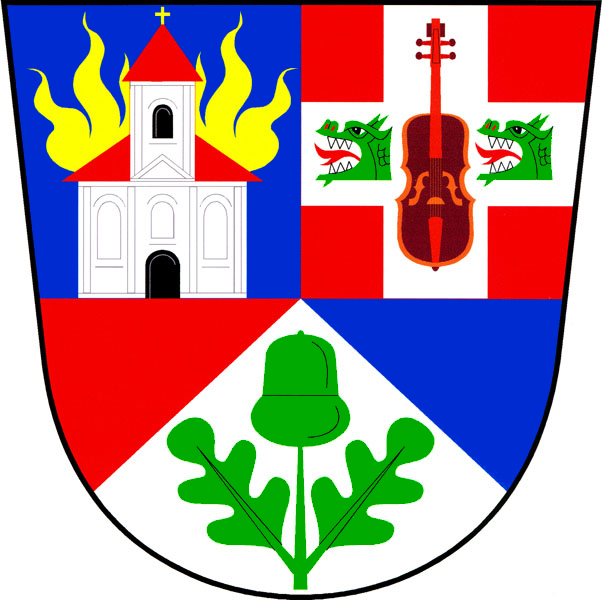
- Flag Coat of arms

- Location in the Czech Republic
- Coordinates: 50°13′2″N 12°26′43″E
- Country: Czech Republic
- Region: Karlovy Vary
- District: Cheb
- First mentioned: 1714

Area
  - Total: 43.68 km^{2} (16.86 sq mi)
- Elevation: 486 m (1,594 ft)

Population (2026-01-01)
  - Total: 530
  - Density: 12/km^{2} (31/sq mi)
- Time zone: UTC+1 (CET)
  - Summer (DST): UTC+2 (CEST)
- Postal code: 351 36
- Website: www.novy-kostel.cz

Nový Kostel (German: Neukirchen) is a municipality and village in Cheb District in the Karlovy Vary Region of the Czech Republic. It has about 500 inhabitants.

== Administrative division ==
Nový Kostel consists of eight municipal parts (in brackets population according to the 2021 census):

- Nový Kostel (271)
- Božetín (32)
- Čižebná (33)
- Horka (17)
- Hrzín (57)
- Kopanina (44)
- Mlýnek (4)
- Spálená (28)

== Demographics ==
Historical population
Year	Pop.	±%
1869	3,700	—
1880	3,521	−4.8%
1890	3,220	−8.5%
1900	3,156	−2.0%
1910	3,057	−3.1%
1921	2,916	−4.6%
1930	3,012	+3.3%
1950	925	−69.3%
1961	855	−7.6%
1970	697	−18.5%
1980	628	−9.9%
1991	519	−17.4%
2001	538	+3.7%
2011	484	−10.0%
2021	486	+0.4%
Source: Censuses
