= Pleš =

Pleš may refer to the following places:

== Croatia ==
- Pleš, Croatia, a village near Bednja

== Serbia ==
- Pleš (Aleksandrovac), a village

== Slovakia ==
- Pleš, Slovakia, a village in Lučenec District

== Slovenia ==
- Pleš, Dolenjske Toplice, a village in the Municipality of Dolenjske Toplice
- Pleš, Kočevje, a hamlet of Borovec pri Kočevski Reki
- Pleš, Žužemberk, a village in the Municipality of Žužemberk

== See also ==
- Ples (disambiguation)
