= Bad Brambach =

- Municipality
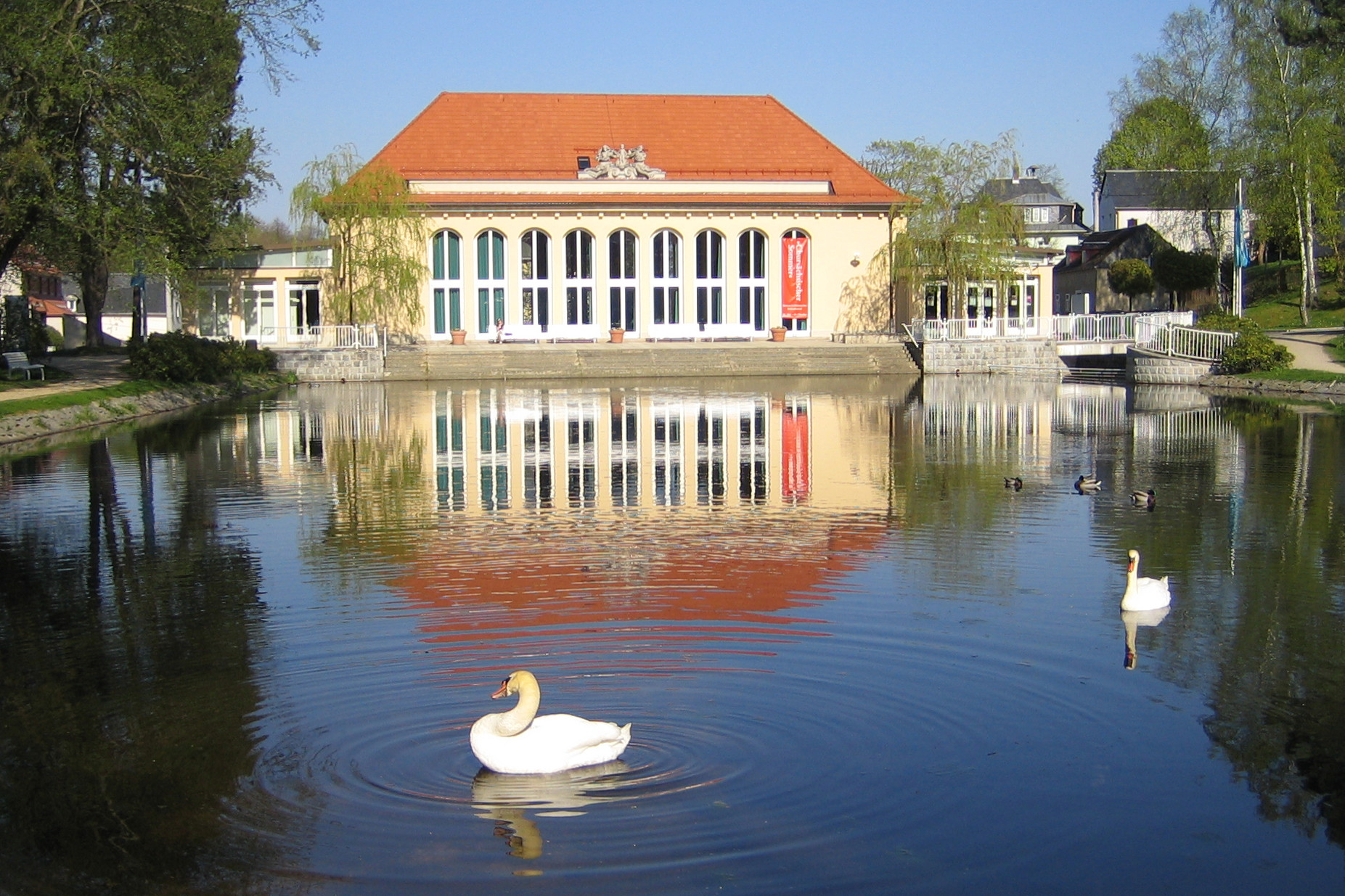
- In the spa park

- Coat of arms

- Location of Bad Brambach within Vogtlandkreis district
- Interactive map of Bad Brambach
- Location within Germany Location within Saxony
- Coordinates: 50°13′N 12°19′E
- Country: Germany
- State: Saxony
- District: Vogtlandkreis
- Subdivisions: 13

Government
  - Mayor (2018–25): Maik Schüller (Ind.)

Area
  - Total: 43.92 km^{2} (16.96 sq mi)
- Elevation: 604 m (1,982 ft)

Population (2025-12-31)
  - Total: 1,547
  - Density: 35.22/km^{2} (91.23/sq mi)
- Time zone: UTC+01:00 (CET)
  - Summer (DST): UTC+02:00 (CEST)
- Postal codes: 08648
- Dialling codes: 03 74 38
- Vehicle registration: V, AE, OVL, PL, RC
- Website: www.badbrambach.de

Bad Brambach (German: [baːt ˈbʁamˌbax]) is a municipality in the Vogtlandkreis district, in Saxony, Germany. It is the southernmost municipality in Saxony and also in what was formerly East Germany. It is a spa town with radon baths.

== Demographics ==
Historical population (31 December):

- 1583: 39
- 1764: 69
- 1871: 1502
- 1890: 1527
- 1910: 1975
- 1925: 2226
- 1939: 2331
- 1946: 2706
- 1950: 2647
- 1964: 2135
- 1971: 2122
- 1998: 2396
- 1999: 2421
- 2000: 2425
- 2001: 2416
- 2002: 2368
- 2003: 2326
- 2004: 2260
- 2007: 2139
- 2008: 2109
- 2012: 2013

Data source: Digital historical files of Saxony (until 1964), from 1998: Statistical Office of Saxony
