= Velký Luh =

- Municipality
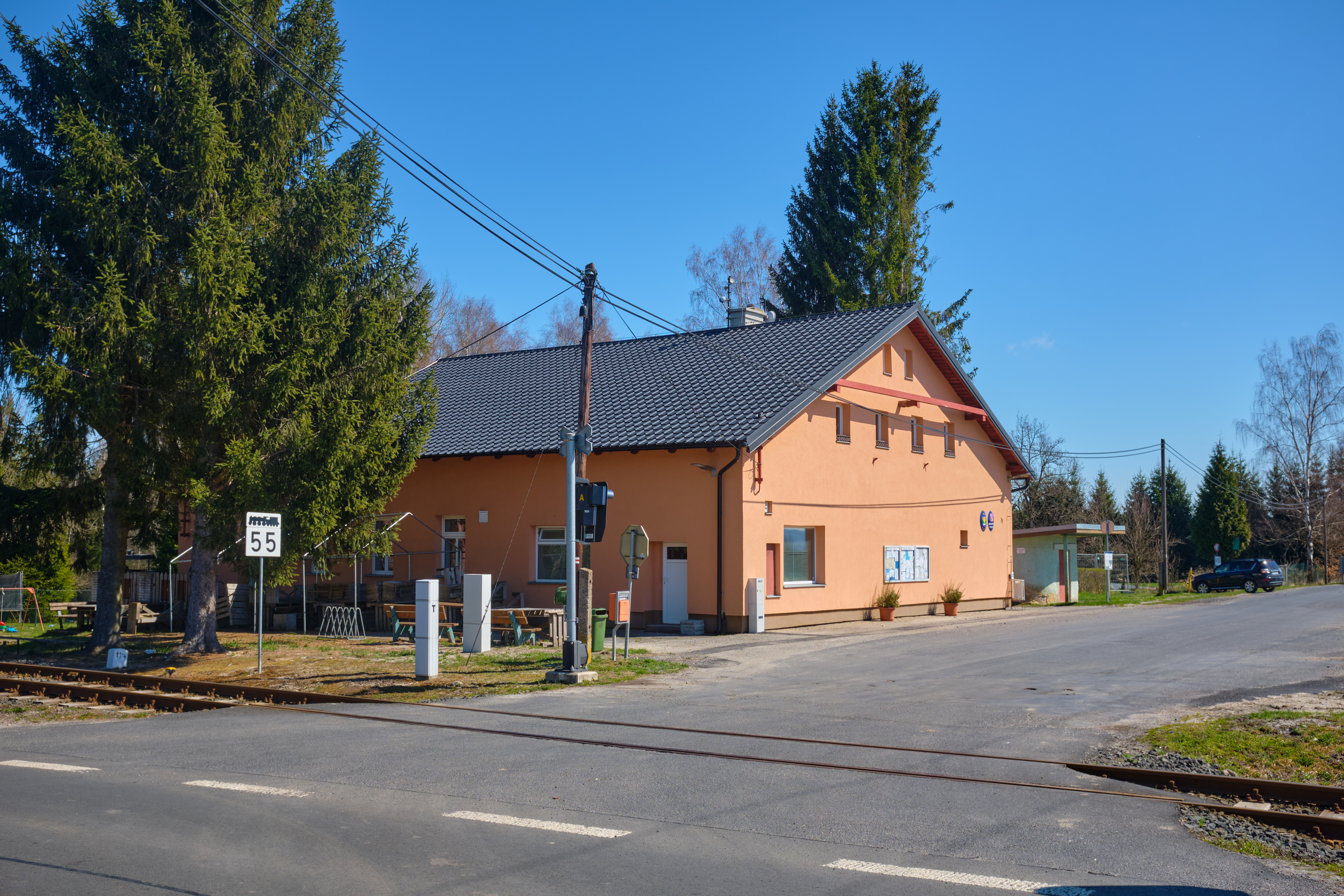
- Municipal office

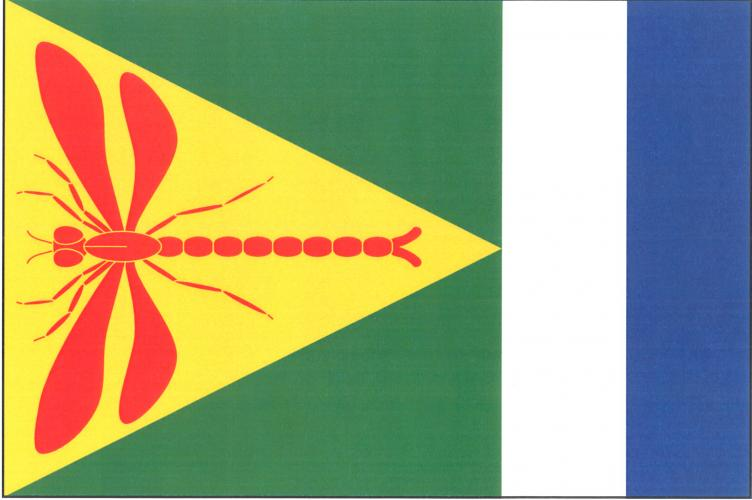
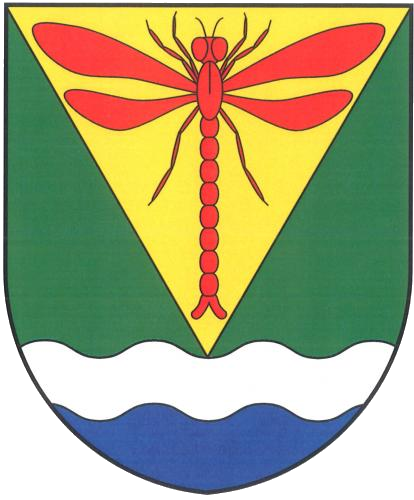
- Flag Coat of arms

- Location in the Czech Republic
- Coordinates: 50°11′57″N 12°22′20″E
- Country: Czech Republic
- Region: Karlovy Vary
- District: Cheb
- First mentioned: 1726

Area
  - Total: 4.52 km^{2} (1.75 sq mi)
- Elevation: 487 m (1,598 ft)

Population (2026-01-01)
  - Total: 180
  - Density: 40/km^{2} (100/sq mi)
- Time zone: UTC+1 (CET)
  - Summer (DST): UTC+2 (CEST)
- Postal code: 351 34
- Website: www.velkyluh.cz

Velký Luh (German: Großloh) is a municipality and village in Cheb District in the Karlovy Vary Region of the Czech Republic. It has about 200 inhabitants.

== Demographics ==
Historical population
Year	Pop.	±%
1869	534	—
1880	487	−8.8%
1890	449	−7.8%
1900	480	+6.9%
1910	458	−4.6%
1921	407	−11.1%
1930	539	+32.4%
1950	170	−68.5%
1961	184	+8.2%
1970	185	+0.5%
1980	134	−27.6%
1991	110	−17.9%
2001	124	+12.7%
2011	127	+2.4%
2021	162	+27.6%
Source: Censuses
