= Milíkov (Cheb District) =

- Municipality
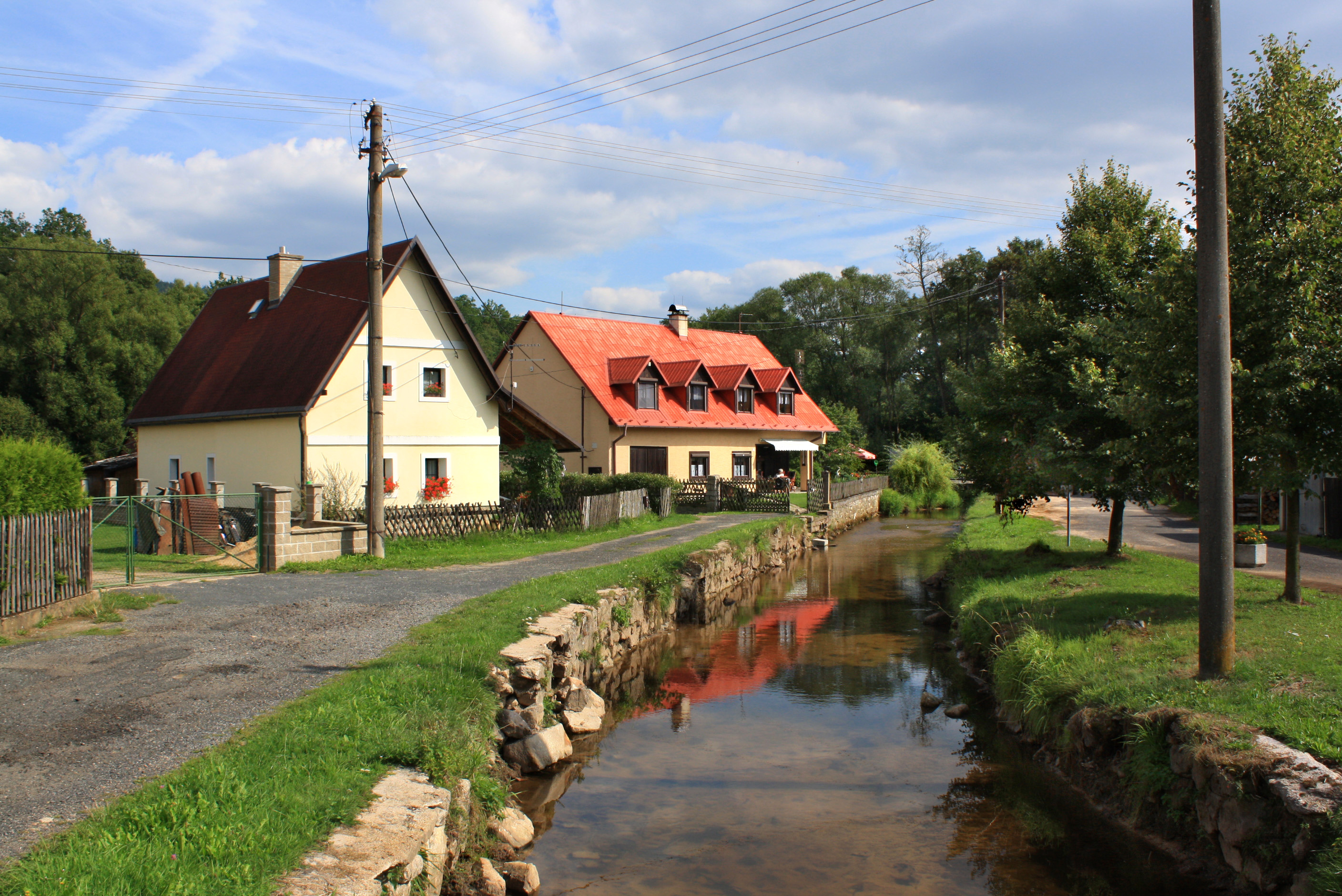
- Lipoltovský potok flowing through Milíkov

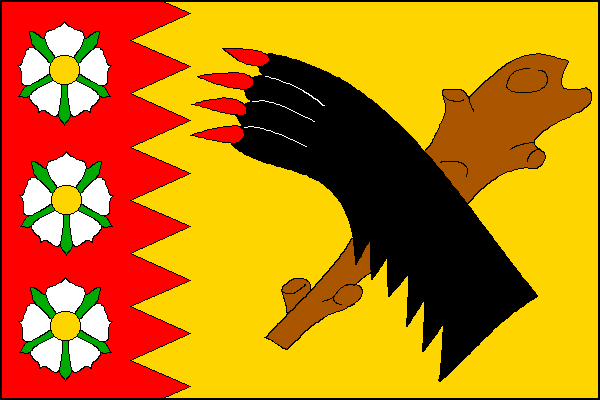
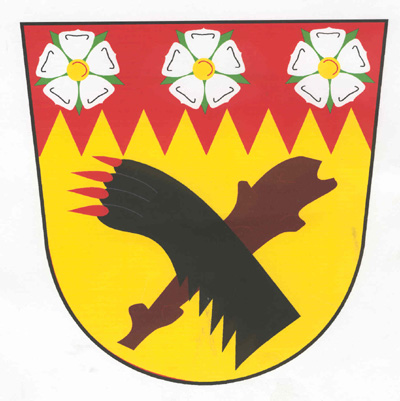
- Flag Coat of arms

- Location in the Czech Republic
- Coordinates: 50°3′21″N 12°32′52″E
- Country: Czech Republic
- Region: Karlovy Vary
- District: Cheb
- First mentioned: 1311

Area
  - Total: 19.48 km^{2} (7.52 sq mi)
- Elevation: 462 m (1,516 ft)

Population (2026-01-01)
  - Total: 293
  - Density: 15.0/km^{2} (39.0/sq mi)
- Time zone: UTC+1 (CET)
  - Summer (DST): UTC+2 (CEST)
- Postal code: 350 02
- Website: www.milikov.cz

Milíkov (German: Miltigau) is a municipality and village in Cheb District in the Karlovy Vary Region of the Czech Republic. It has about 300 inhabitants.

== Administrative division ==
Milíkov consists of five municipal parts (in brackets population according to the 2021 census):

- Milíkov (155)
- Malá Šitboř (74)
- Mokřina (27)
- Těšov (24)
- Velká Šitboř (18)

== Etymology ==
The name is derived from the personal name Milík, meaning "Milík's (court)".

== Geography ==
Milíkov is located about 12 kilometres (7 mi) east of Cheb and 30 km (19 mi) southwest of Karlovy Vary. It lies on the border between the Cheb Basin and Slavkov Forest. The highest point is at 713 m (2,339 ft) above sea level. The stream Lipoltovský potok flows through the municipality.

== History ==
The first written mention of Milíkov is from 1311. The owners of the village often changed.

== Demographics ==
Historical population

Year	Pop.	±%
1869	2,141	—
1880	2,163	+1.0%
1890	1,856	−14.2%
1900	1,729	−6.8%
1910	1,584	−8.4%

Year	Pop.	±%
1921	1,530	−3.4%
1930	1,540	+0.7%
1950	497	−67.7%
1961	429	−13.7%
1970	359	−16.3%

Year	Pop.	±%
1980	252	−29.8%
1991	201	−20.2%
2001	213	+6.0%
2011	243	+14.1%
2021	298	+22.6%

Source: Censuses

== Transport ==
The I/21 road, which connects the D5 and D6 motorways, runs along the southwestern municipal border.

== Sights ==
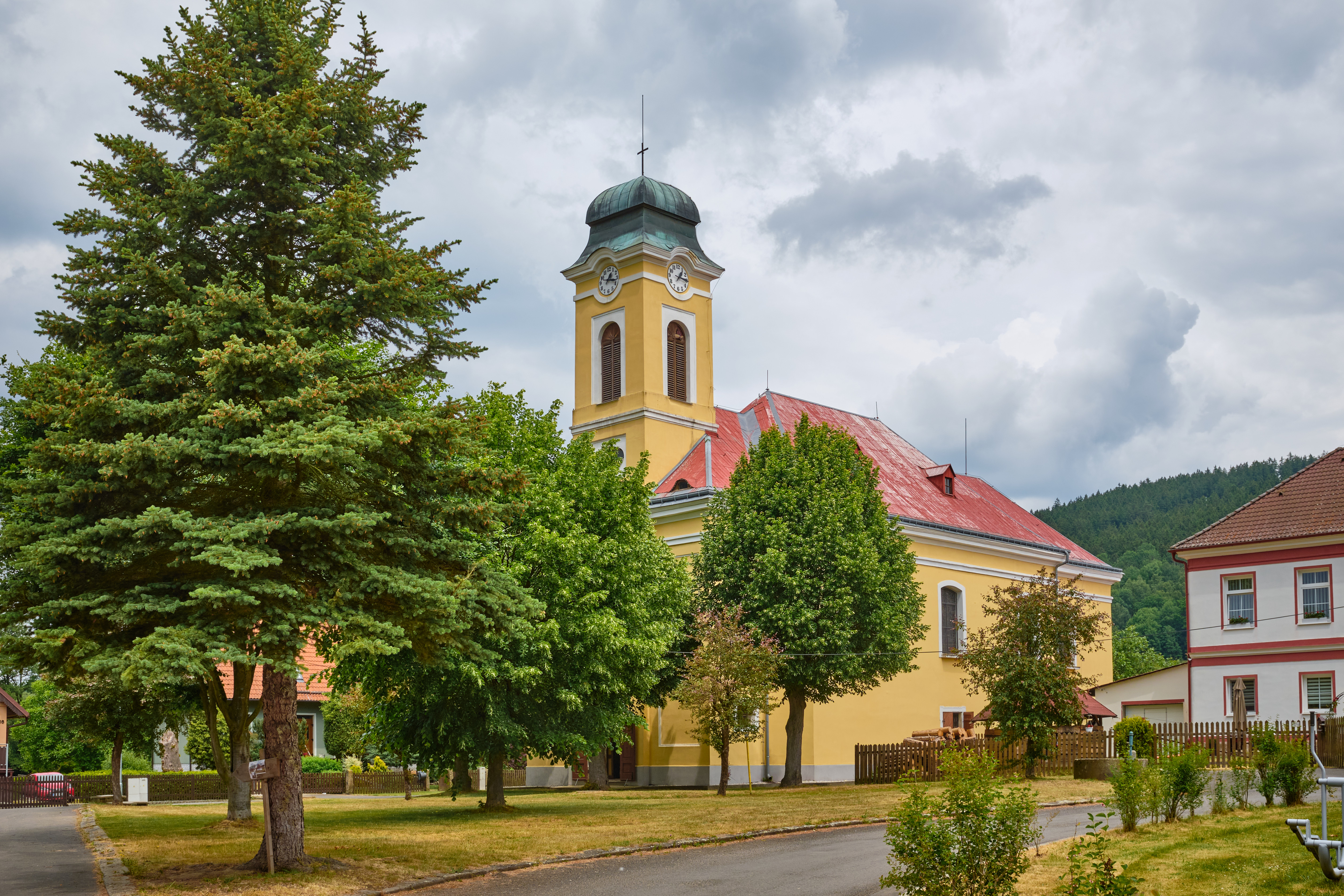
Church of Saints Simon and Jude

The main landmark of Milíkov is the Church of Saints Simon and Jude. It was originally a chapel, rebuilt and extended into the church in 1787. In 1818–1820, it was rebuilt in the late Neoclassical style.
