= Plesná =

- Town
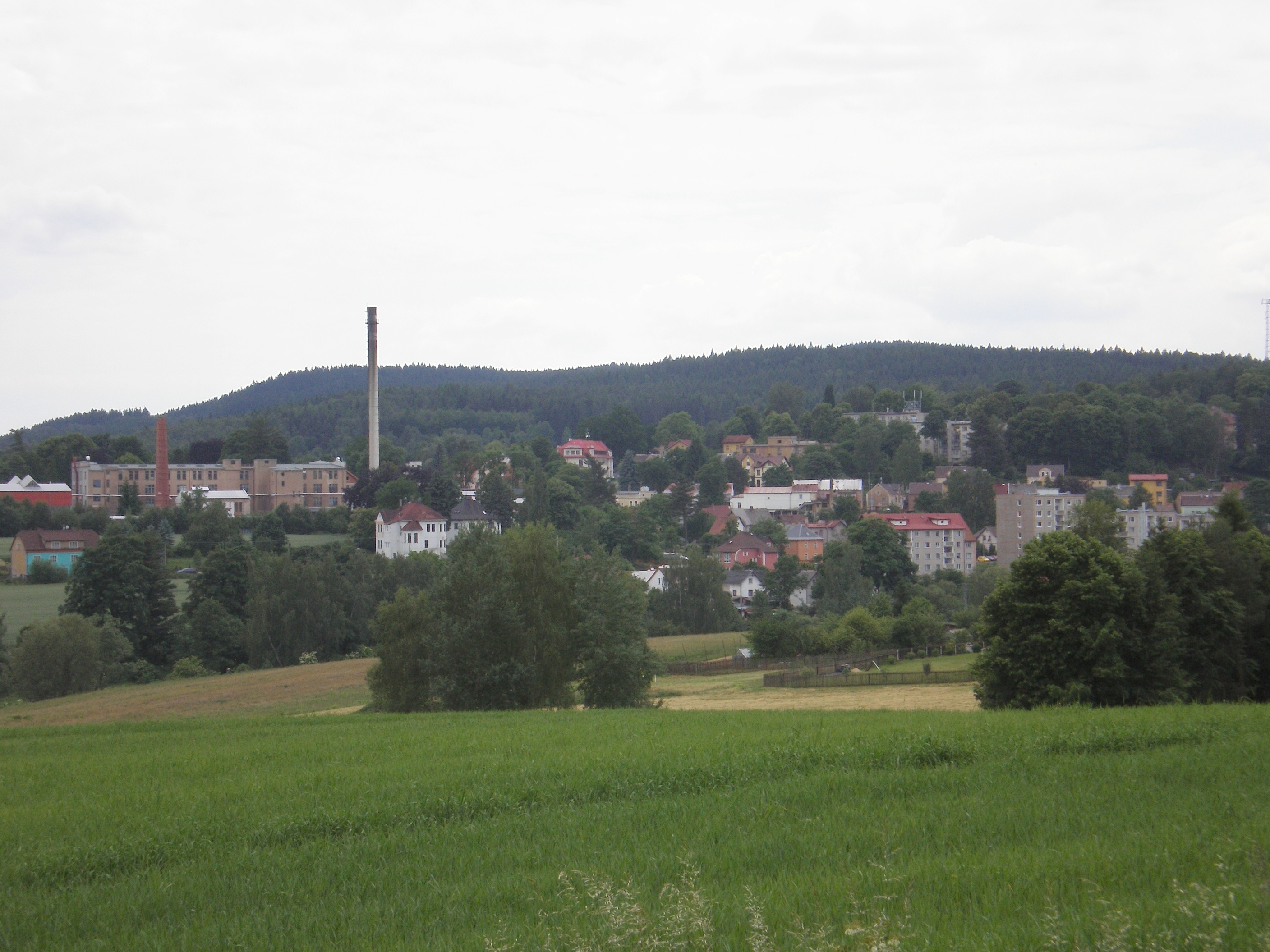
- View of the town

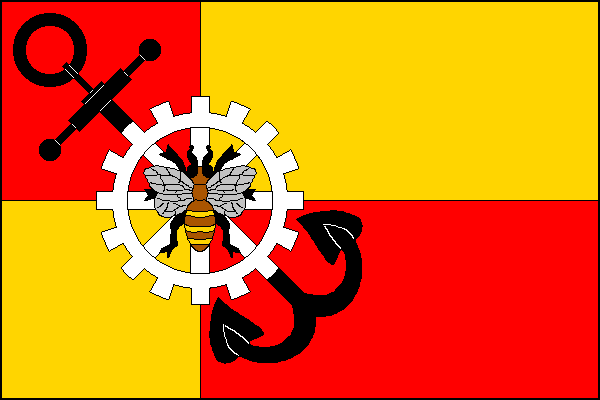
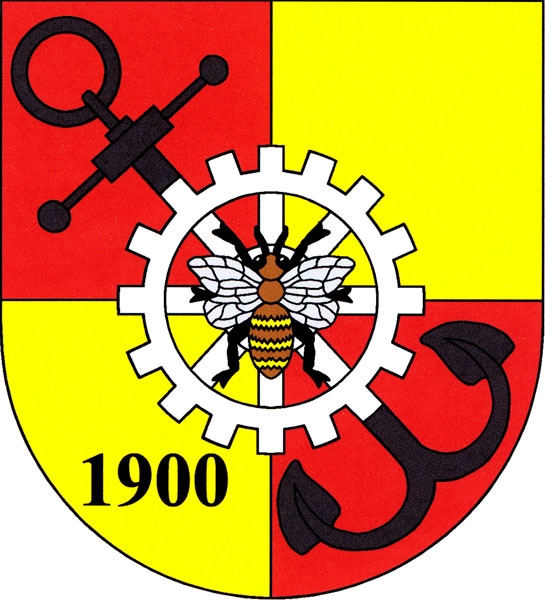
- Flag Coat of arms

- Location in the Czech Republic
- Coordinates: 50°10′14″N 12°21′41″E
- Country: Czech Republic
- Region: Karlovy Vary
- District: Cheb
- First mentioned: 1185

Government
  - Mayor: Petr Schaller

Area
  - Total: 19.26 km^{2} (7.44 sq mi)
- Elevation: 499 m (1,637 ft)

Population (2026-01-01)
  - Total: 1,890
  - Density: 98.1/km^{2} (254/sq mi)
- Time zone: UTC+1 (CET)
  - Summer (DST): UTC+2 (CEST)
- Postal code: 351 35
- Website: www.mestoplesna.cz

Plesná (Czech pronunciation: [ˈplɛsnaː]; German: Fleißen) is a town in Cheb District in the Karlovy Vary Region of the Czech Republic. It has about 1,900 inhabitants. The town is located on the Plesná River in the Fichtel Mountains.

== Administrative division ==
Plesná consists of four municipal parts (in brackets population according to the 2021 census):

- Plesná (1,755)
- Lomnička (89)
- Smrčina (6)
- Vackov (8)

== Etymology ==
The town was named after the Plesná River.

== Geography ==
Plesná is located about 15 kilometres (9 mi) north of Cheb and 36 km (22 mi) west of Karlovy Vary, on the border with Germany. It lies in the Fichtel Mountains. The highest point is the hill Bukový vrch at 650 m (2,133 ft) above sea level. The Plesná River flows through the town.

== History ==
The first written mention of Plesná is from 1185, when it belonged to Waldsassen Abbey. In 1900, Plesná became a town.

== Demographics ==
Historical population

Year	Pop.	±%
1869	2,907	—
1880	3,040	+4.6%
1890	3,239	+6.5%
1900	3,861	+19.2%
1910	4,725	+22.4%

Year	Pop.	±%
1921	4,416	−6.5%
1930	5,425	+22.8%
1950	2,126	−60.8%
1961	1,996	−6.1%
1970	2,014	+0.9%

Year	Pop.	±%
1980	1,883	−6.5%
1991	1,692	−10.1%
2001	1,982	+17.1%
2011	2,021	+2.0%
2021	1,858	−8.1%

Source: Censuses

== Transport ==
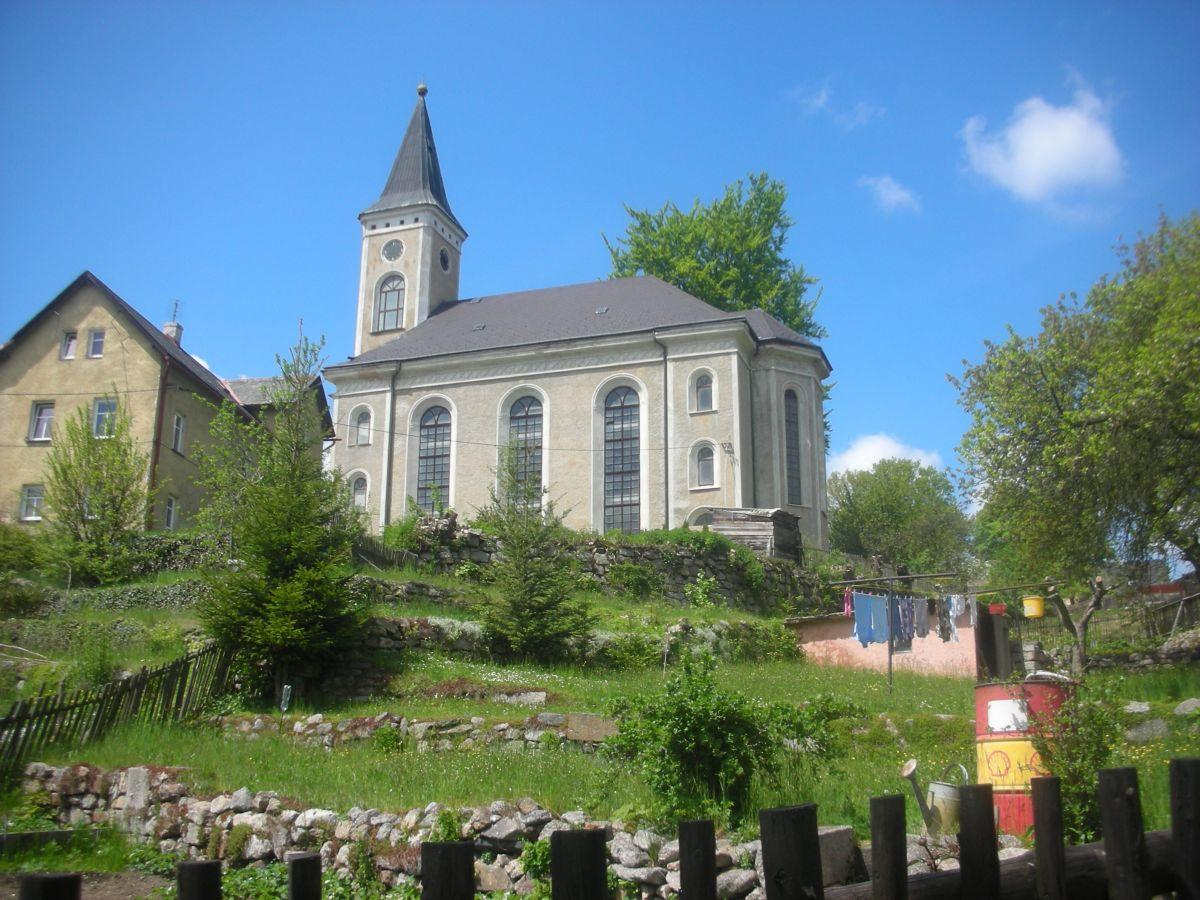
Lutheran church

Plesná is located on the railway line Cheb–Bad Brambach.

On the Czech–German border is the road border crossing Plesná / Bad Brambach and the railway border crossing Vojtanov / Bad Brambach.

== Sights ==
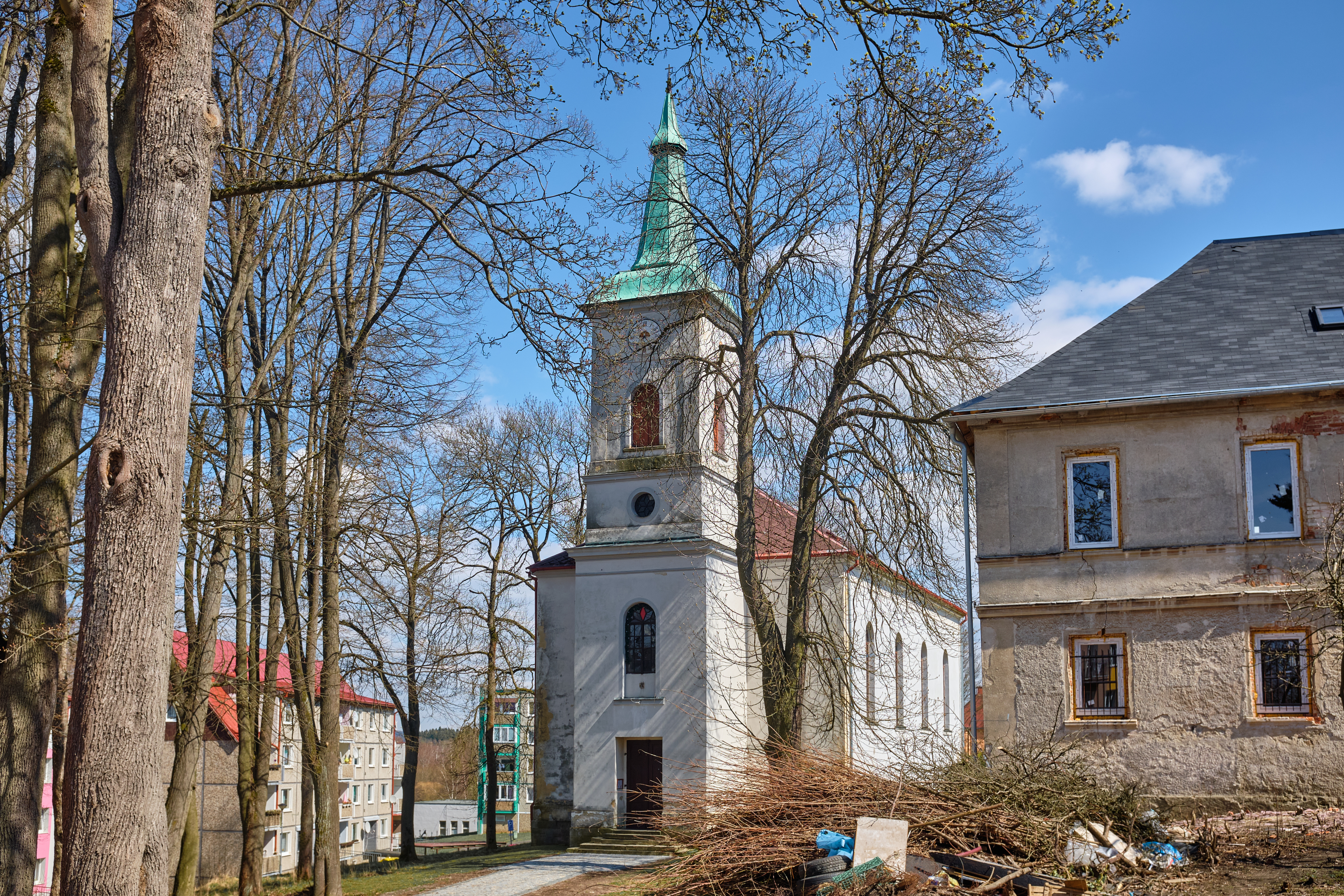
Church of the Immaculate Conception

The most valuable cultural landmark is the Lutheran church, located in the northwestern part of the town. It was built in the Neo-Renaissance style in 1847–1849.

A notable landmark is the Church of the Immaculate Conception. It was built in the Historicist style in 1893–1895. However, it is not protected as a cultural monument.

There are several conciliation crosses in the territory of Plesná. A set of three such crosses from 1864, situated in the western part of Plesná. Another conciliation cross is in Lomnička.

In the southern part of the municipal territory are the remnants of the medieval gord called Neuhaus. Today, only landscaping is visible.

== Notable people ==
- Isaac Mayer Wise (1819–1900), American Reform rabbi
- František Nedvěd (1950–2010), weightlifter

== Twin towns – sister cities ==
Plesná is twinned with:

- Bad Brambach, Germany
- Eichenzell, Germany
- Erbendorf, Germany
- Rosenthal am Rennsteig, Germany
