= Mokřiny (Aš) =

Village in the Czech Republic

- Municipal part of Aš
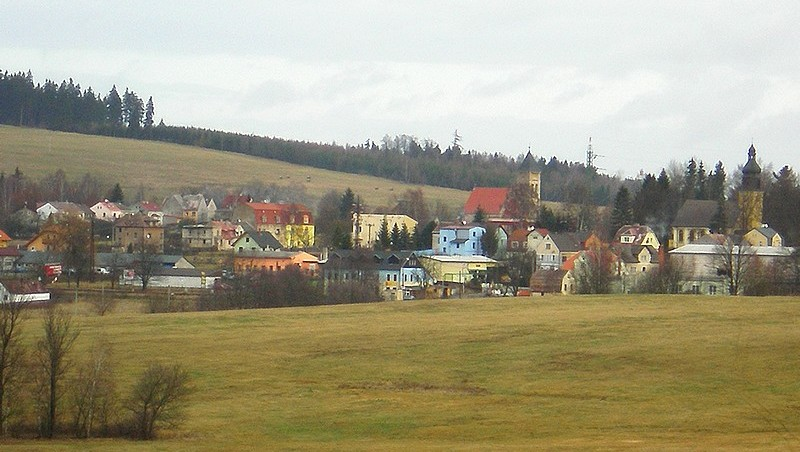
- Interactive map of Mokřiny
- Coordinates: 50°12′23″N 12°12′31″E
- Country: Czech Republic
- Region: Karlovy Vary
- District: Cheb
- Municipality: Aš
- First mentioned: 1315

Area
  - Total: 3.41 km^{2} (1.32 sq mi)

Population (2021)
  - Total: 527
  - Density: 155/km^{2} (400/sq mi)
- Time zone: UTC+1 (CET)
  - Summer (DST): UTC+2 (CEST)
- Postal code: 352 01

Mokřiny (German: Nassengrub) is a village and municipal part of Aš in the Karlovy Vary Region of the Czech Republic. It has about 500 inhabitants.

== Geography ==
Mokřiny is located to the south from Aš; unlike other municipal parts, it forms a continuous populated area with it. To the east it neighbours with Vernéřov, to the south with Nový Žďár, and to the southeast with Nebesa. To the west is the German border.

== History ==
Mokřiny was established by the Zedtwitz, before 1413, when it is first mentioned. In 1874 Mokřiny became a separate municipality. In 1971 it was joined with Aš.

== Demographics ==
Historical population

Year	Pop.	±%
1869	393	—
1880	387	−1.5%
1890	402	+3.9%
1900	783	+94.8%
1910	1,287	+64.4%
1921	1,142	−11.3%
1930	1,726	+51.1%
1950	676	−60.8%

Year	Pop.	±%
1961	707	+4.6%
1970	624	−11.7%
1980	541	−13.3%
1991	479	−11.5%
2001	530	+10.6%
2011	557	+5.1%
2021	527	−5.4%

Source: Censuses

== Landmarks ==
- Catholic church of St. Charles Borromeo from 1912,
- Protestant church from 1913 (from architect Otto Bartning),
- World War I Memorial from 1924.

== Notable residents ==
- Karl Fritzsch (1903–1945), Nazi SS Auschwitz concentration camp commandant who was the first to use Zyklon B for mass murder

== Gallery ==
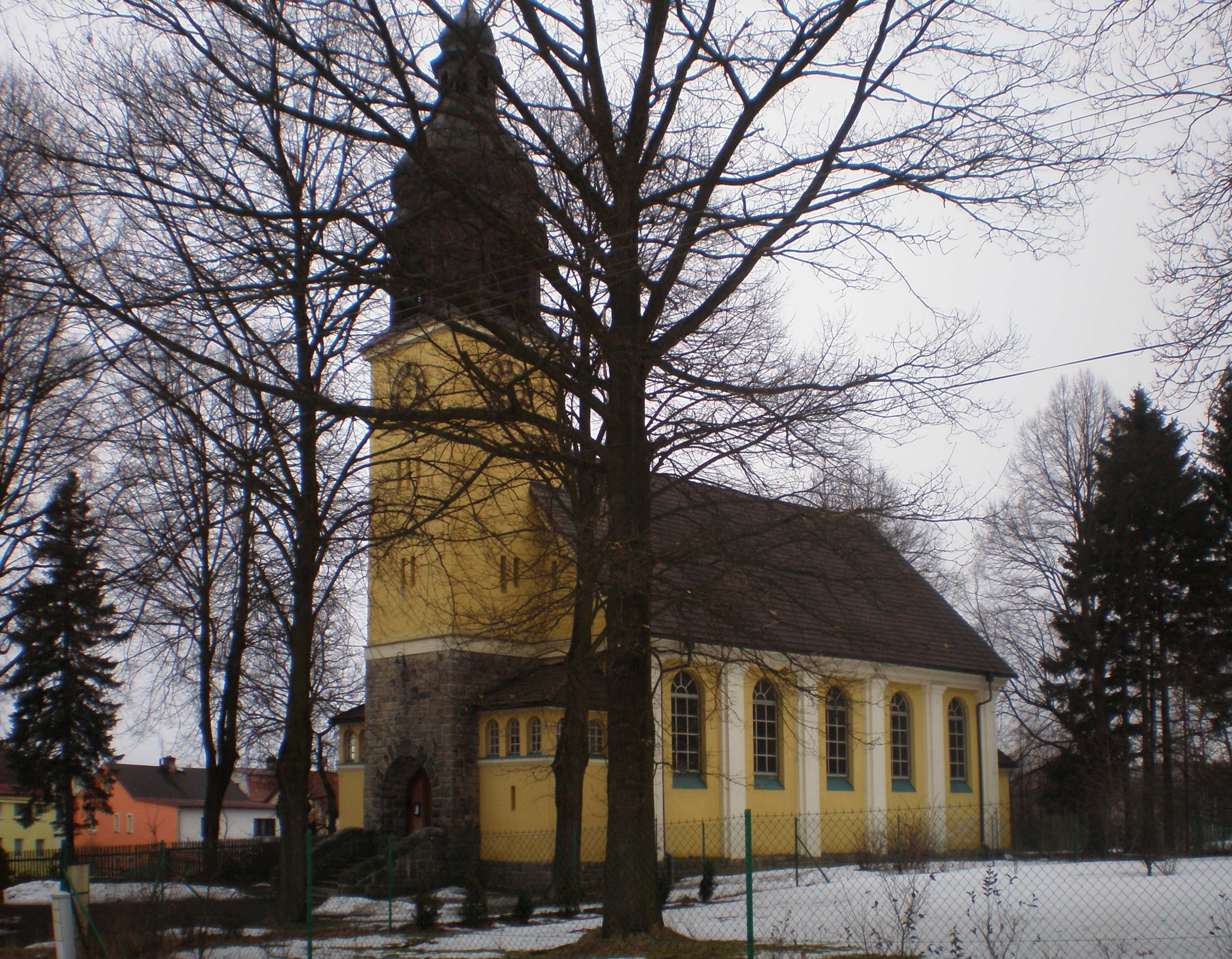
Evangelic church.

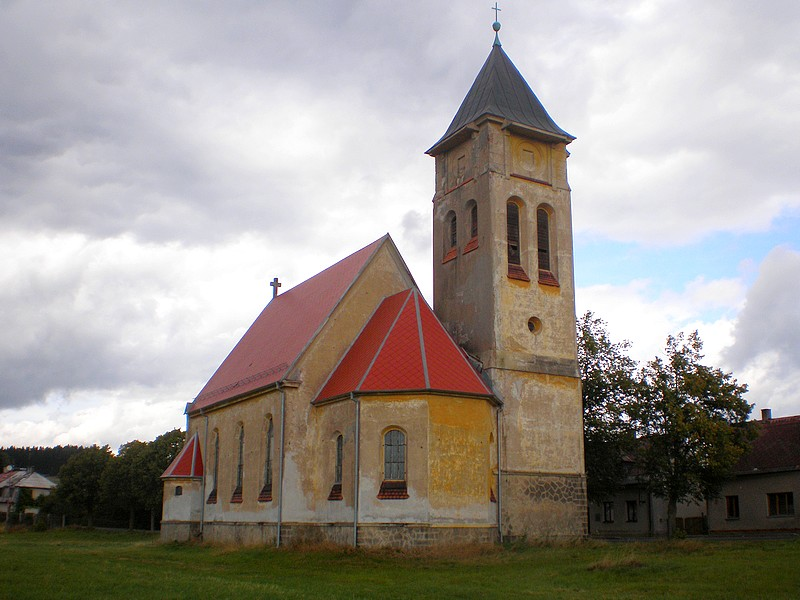
Church of St. Charles Borromeo.
