= Aš =

Town in the Czech Republic

- Town
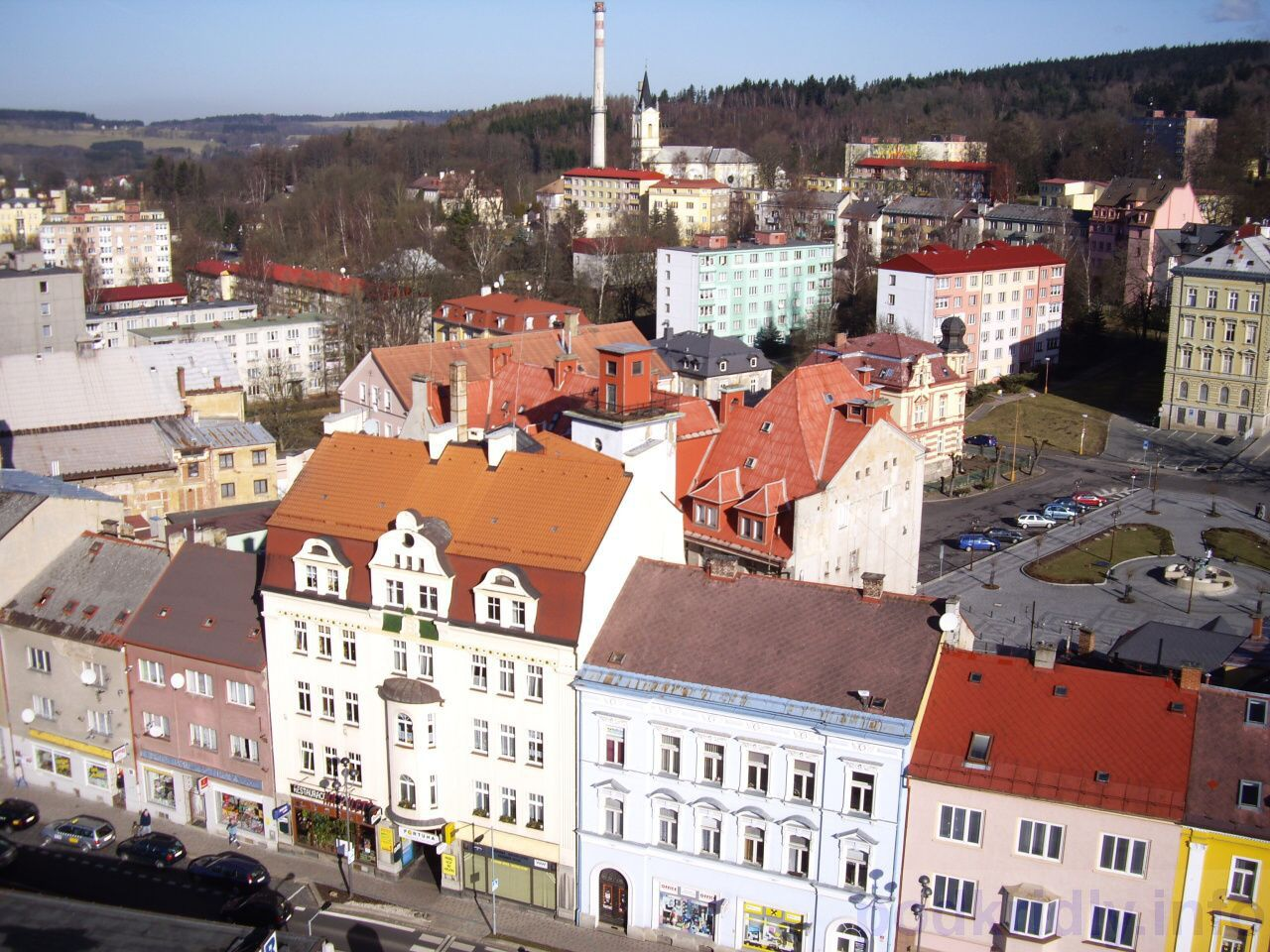
- Town centre

- Flag Coat of arms

- Location in the Czech Republic
- Coordinates: 50°13′26″N 12°11′42″E
- Country: Czech Republic
- Region: Karlovy Vary
- District: Cheb
- First mentioned: 1270

Government
  - Mayor: Marian Rewczuk

Area
  - Total: 55.86 km^{2} (21.57 sq mi)
- Elevation: 666 m (2,185 ft)

Population (2026-01-01)
  - Total: 12,683
  - Density: 227.0/km^{2} (588.1/sq mi)
- Time zone: UTC+1 (CET)
  - Summer (DST): UTC+2 (CEST)
- Postal code: 352 01
- Website: www.muas.cz

Aš (Czech pronunciation: [aʃ]; German: Asch) is a town in Cheb District in the Karlovy Vary Region of the Czech Republic. It has about 13,000 inhabitants. The town is located in the Fichtel Mountains, in the westernmost part of the country, on the border with Germany.

The town grew rapidly due to industrialisation in the second half of the 19th and first half of the 20th centuries, but after World War II and the expulsion of German-speaking inhabitants, the town's population and importance decreased significantly.

== Administrative division ==
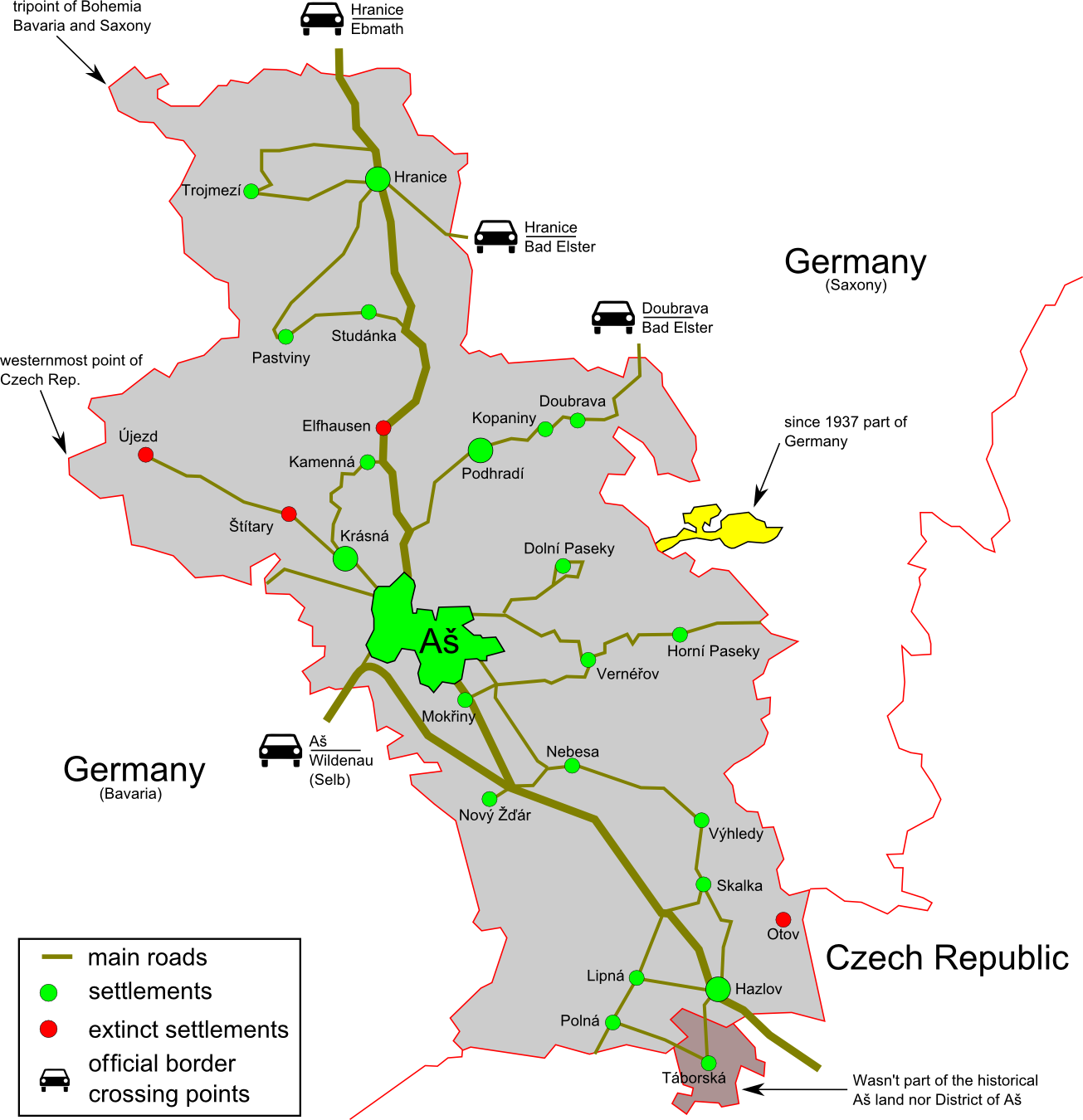
Aš Panhandle

Aš consists of nine municipal parts (in brackets population according to the 2021 census):

- Aš (11,181)
- Dolní Paseky (58)
- Doubrava (83)
- Horní Paseky (71)
- Kopaniny (123)
- Mokřiny (527)
- Nebesa (27)
- Nový Žďár (32)
- Vernéřov (155)

== Etymology ==
The initial name of the settlement was probably Ascha. The name was derived from the High German words ask (i.e. 'ash') and aha ('water', 'stream'), referring to a stream flowing between ash trees. The Czech name was created by transcription of the German name. Alongside with the municipality of Eš, Aš has the shortest place name in the Czech Republic.

== Geography ==
Aš is located about 19 kilometres (12 mi) northwest of Cheb, on the border with Germany. With the neighbouring municipalities Hranice, Krásná, Podhradí and Hazlov, it lies in the westernmost area of the Czech Republic known as the Aš Panhandle. This area is a salient surrounded by German territory in the east, north and west. It lies in the historical Egerland region.

Aš is situated in the Fichtel Mountains. The highest point of Aš and the whole Czech part of the Fichtel Mountains is Háj, at 758 m (2,487 ft). The upper course of the White Elster River shortly after its source flows across the central part of the municipal territory, outside the town proper. The upper course of the Plesná River partly forms the Czech–German border east of the town proper.

=== Climate ===
Aš has a humid continental climate (Köppen: Dfb; Trewartha: Dclo).

Climate data for Aš, 1991–2020 normals, extremes 1951–present
Month	Jan	Feb	Mar	Apr	May	Jun	Jul	Aug	Sep	Oct	Nov	Dec	Year
Record high °C (°F)	11.8 (53.2)	16.9 (62.4)	22.4 (72.3)	28.3 (82.9)	31.0 (87.8)	33.6 (92.5)	34.1 (93.4)	34.9 (94.8)	30.2 (86.4)	25.0 (77.0)	16.0 (60.8)	13.0 (55.4)	34.9 (94.8)
Mean daily maximum °C (°F)	0.2 (32.4)	1.8 (35.2)	6.4 (43.5)	12.4 (54.3)	16.8 (62.2)	20.0 (68.0)	22.0 (71.6)	21.9 (71.4)	16.7 (62.1)	10.8 (51.4)	4.5 (40.1)	0.9 (33.6)	11.2 (52.2)
Daily mean °C (°F)	−2.0 (28.4)	−1.2 (29.8)	2.4 (36.3)	7.3 (45.1)	11.5 (52.7)	14.8 (58.6)	16.7 (62.1)	16.4 (61.5)	12.0 (53.6)	7.2 (45.0)	2.3 (36.1)	−1.1 (30.0)	7.2 (45.0)
Mean daily minimum °C (°F)	−4.1 (24.6)	−3.7 (25.3)	−0.7 (30.7)	3.3 (37.9)	7.3 (45.1)	10.5 (50.9)	12.4 (54.3)	12.3 (54.1)	8.6 (47.5)	4.5 (40.1)	0.3 (32.5)	−3.0 (26.6)	4.0 (39.2)
Record low °C (°F)	−24.5 (−12.1)	−29.0 (−20.2)	−20.5 (−4.9)	−12.4 (9.7)	−4.9 (23.2)	−0.5 (31.1)	−0.2 (31.6)	1.0 (33.8)	−1.3 (29.7)	−7.3 (18.9)	−13.2 (8.2)	−23.3 (−9.9)	−29.0 (−20.2)
Average precipitation mm (inches)	57.9 (2.28)	47.4 (1.87)	53.3 (2.10)	37.1 (1.46)	64.0 (2.52)	74.4 (2.93)	88.5 (3.48)	77.7 (3.06)	64.5 (2.54)	58.3 (2.30)	56.7 (2.23)	60.6 (2.39)	740.5 (29.15)
Average snowfall cm (inches)	37.9 (14.9)	35.1 (13.8)	20.1 (7.9)	2.9 (1.1)	0.0 (0.0)	0.0 (0.0)	0.0 (0.0)	0.0 (0.0)	0.0 (0.0)	1.1 (0.4)	15.2 (6.0)	34.0 (13.4)	146.3 (57.6)
Average relative humidity (%)	87.0	83.0	77.3	69.7	70.4	71.5	71.1	72.2	78.7	84.1	88.6	89.1	78.5
Mean monthly sunshine hours	35.9	66.0	121.4	183.7	173.5	201.5	226.2	205.9	150.6	85.4	46.2	31.1	1,527.3
Source: Czech Hydrometeorological Institute

== History ==
=== 11th–18th centuries ===
Previously uninhabited hills and swamps, the town of Aš was founded in the early 11th century by German colonists descending from the Bavarian march of the Nordgau in the course of the Ostsiedlung. So far, previous Slavic settlements in the area are not known.

The first recorded rulers were the Vogt ministeriales from Weida, Thuringia, who gave the entire Vogtland region its name. In 1281, they officially received the estates as an immediate fief at the hands of King Rudolph I of Germany. Emperor Louis IV elevated them to Princes of the Holy Roman Empire in 1329. Nevertheless, two years later, they sold Aš land to King John of Bohemia, who since 1322 also held the adjacent Egerland in the south. Together with neighbouring Selb and Elster, Aš was enfeoffed to the Freiherren of Neuberg (Podhradí). When in 1394 Konrad von Neuburg died without a male heir, by virtue of Hedwig von Neuburg's marriage to Konrad von Zedtwitz, Aš passed into the control of the noble Zedtwitz family.

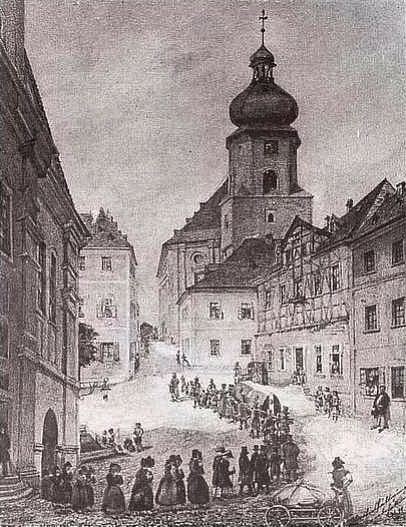
Church attendance in Aš, 19th century

In 1557, the Aš region was incorporated into the Lands of the Bohemian Crown by the Habsburg king Ferdinand I. Like the neighbouring Egerland, it remained Protestant until the Thirty Years' War, as the Counter-Reformation did not stretch to the West Bohemian borderlands. In the 1648 Peace of Westphalia, the Protestant confession of the citizens was confirmed. In 1774, Empress Maria Theresa officially mediatised Aš as part of the Bohemian crown land within the Habsburg monarchy, against the delaying resistance by the Zedtwitz family. Nevertheless, she granted its Protestant citizens freedom of religion, confirmed in the 1781 Patent of Toleration, issued by her son Emperor Joseph II.

=== 19th–20th centuries ===
From 1804, Aš with Bohemia belonged to the Austrian Empire, and after the Compromise of 1867 to Austria-Hungary. From 1868 until 1918, the town was head of the Asch district, one of the 94 Bezirkshauptmannschaften in Bohemia. Aš was linked to the Eger (Cheb)–Hof railway line in 1864, with a branch-off to Saxon Adorf opened in 1885. It obtained the status of a town in 1872, as the population grew due to a flourishing textile industry. By 1910 the population had risen to 21,880, from 9,405 in 1869.

Upon the dissolution of Austria-Hungary at the end of World War I, a soldiers' council seized power and rejected the demands of separatists from Cheb for annexation to the Bavarian lands of the German Weimar Republic, preferring to remain with the Republic of German-Austria, which was however soon denied by the 1919 Paris Peace Conference. During the negotiations of the Treaty of Saint-Germain-en-Laye the Americans, like Allen Welsh Dulles, had failed to persuade other powers to make at least the Bohemian peninsulas within Germany, like Aš Land or Rumburk in the Šluknov Hook, legal parts of Weimar Germany. Thus the area became part of newly established First Czechoslovak Republic, and received its current Czech name. On 18 November 1920, Czech militia toppled the monument of Emperor Joseph II against local protest, whereby three citizens were shot. A 1921 Czechoslovak census counted 183 ethnic Czechs in a population of 40,000 in the district, a 1930 census 520 Czechs in a population of 45,000 in the district.

Wehrmacht soldiers parading in Aš, 1938

In 1937, the Sudeten German Party took over in Aš, led by Konrad Henlein, who for several years had worked in the town as a gym teacher. Henlein openly advocated the annexation of the Sudetenland territories to Nazi Germany, while Czech residents, mainly officials, were forced to leave the town. On 22 September 1938, a few days before the Munich Agreement, a Sudeten German Freikorps proclaimed a "Free State of Asch". Upon the German occupation of Czechoslovakia in October, according to the Agreement, Wehrmacht troops officially arrived, unopposed. By 1939, a German census counted a population of 23,123 in the town, with majority (12,502) of Protestants and significant minority (10,023) of Catholics. From 1938 to 1945, Aš was administered as part of the Reichsgau Sudetenland.

At the end of World War II, the town was occupied by the United States Army on 20 April 1945. Czech officials arrested 64 men on 7 June and took them to Bory Prison in Plzeň, where half of them perished Due to the Expulsion of Germans from Czechoslovakia in 1946 by the Beneš decrees, the town's population was reduced to "half of the pre-war number of inhabitants". A German expellee website states that 30,327 Germans have been expelled from March to November in 27 trains. In 1949, 3,000 expellees met in far away Rüdesheim am Rhein, to protest, stating that their area never was inhabited by Slavs other than as a tiny minority.

The population shrank to just 10,000 by 1951 due to the establishment of the Iron Curtain and the border fortifications during the Cold War, as the whole Aš district was included into the border zone which made many people move out. Border controls became even stricter under pressure from Joseph Stalin in 1951, after a train containing 110 passengers smashed through the border barriers into Selb, West Germany. Czechoslovak citizens became unable to live in the town without special permits, the Border Guards erected numerous road blocks around the area, and the population fell under strict scrutiny from the StB.

Because of the lowering number of inhabitants, some houses remained uninhabited. There was lack of money for their renovation and it was necessary to demolish them. The houses were replaced by thousands of new prefabricated apartment blocs in the 1960s and the 1970s.

After the Velvet Revolution, the loosening of border restrictions resulted in an economic boom for the town in the 1990s. Numerous brothels, casinos, shopping centres, and gas stations were built near the border to cater to German tourists and shoppers seeking cheaper goods. Some of the town's streets, parks, historic buildings were reconstructed and restored in the 2000s. The rail route into Selb was reconnected in 2015.

== Demographics ==
The present-day population in the town is roughly half of the pre-war population.

Historical population

Year	Pop.	±%
1869	13,888	—
1880	17,589	+26.6%
1890	19,885	+13.1%
1900	23,737	+19.4%
1910	27,772	+17.0%

Year	Pop.	±%
1921	24,618	−11.4%
1930	28,916	+17.5%
1950	12,484	−56.8%
1961	11,209	−10.2%
1970	12,843	+14.6%

Year	Pop.	±%
1980	12,925	+0.6%
1991	12,285	−5.0%
2001	12,584	+2.4%
2011	12,643	+0.5%
2021	12,257	−3.1%

Source: Censuses

== Transport ==
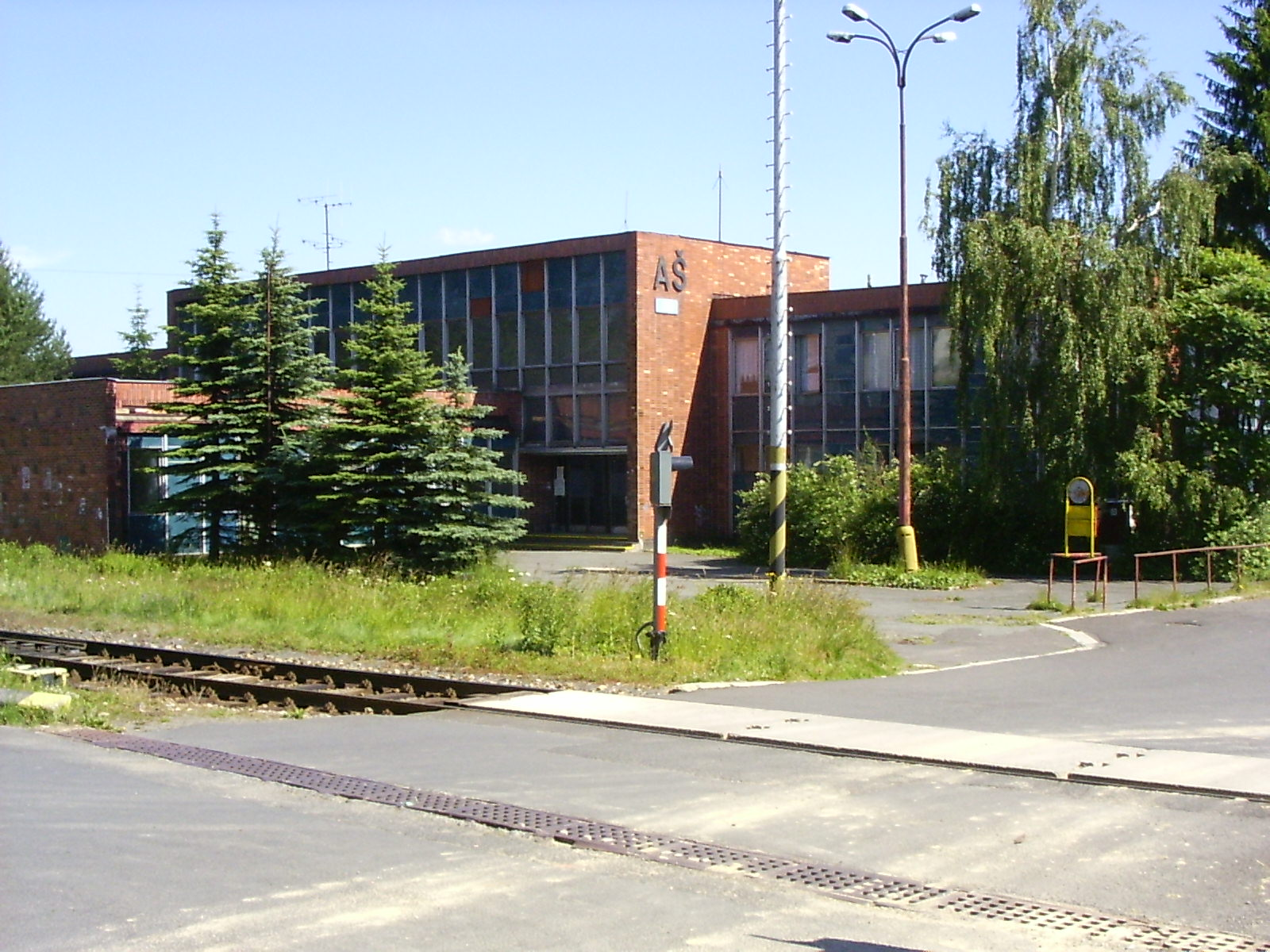
Main station

There are three road border crossings and one railway border crossing. Road border crossings lead to Bad Elster and Bad Brambach in Saxony in the east, as well as to Selb in Bavaria in the west. The railway border crossing leads to Selb.

Aš is located on the railway lines Hof–Marktredwitz via Cheb and Aš–Hranice. There are three train stations and stops: Aš (the main train station), Aš-město and Aš-předměstí. The railway and the first station were built in 1865. In 1968, the old Royal Bavarian State Railways station building was demolished, and the current one was built in 1969.

== Education ==
There are five kindergartens, four primary schools, a gymnasium, a special school and a school of art located in Aš. A high school of textile also existed here.

== Sights ==
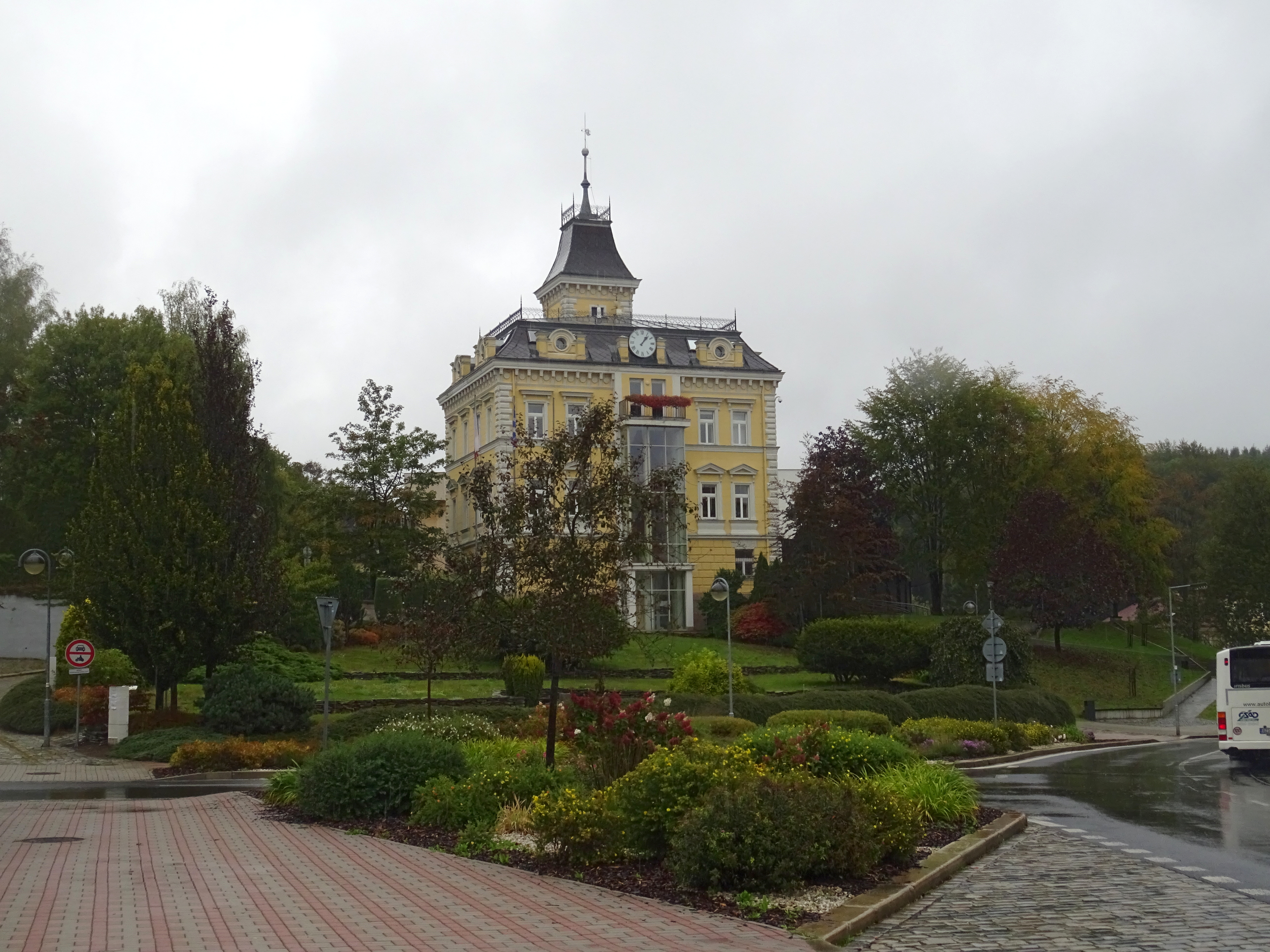
Goetheho náměstí with the town hall

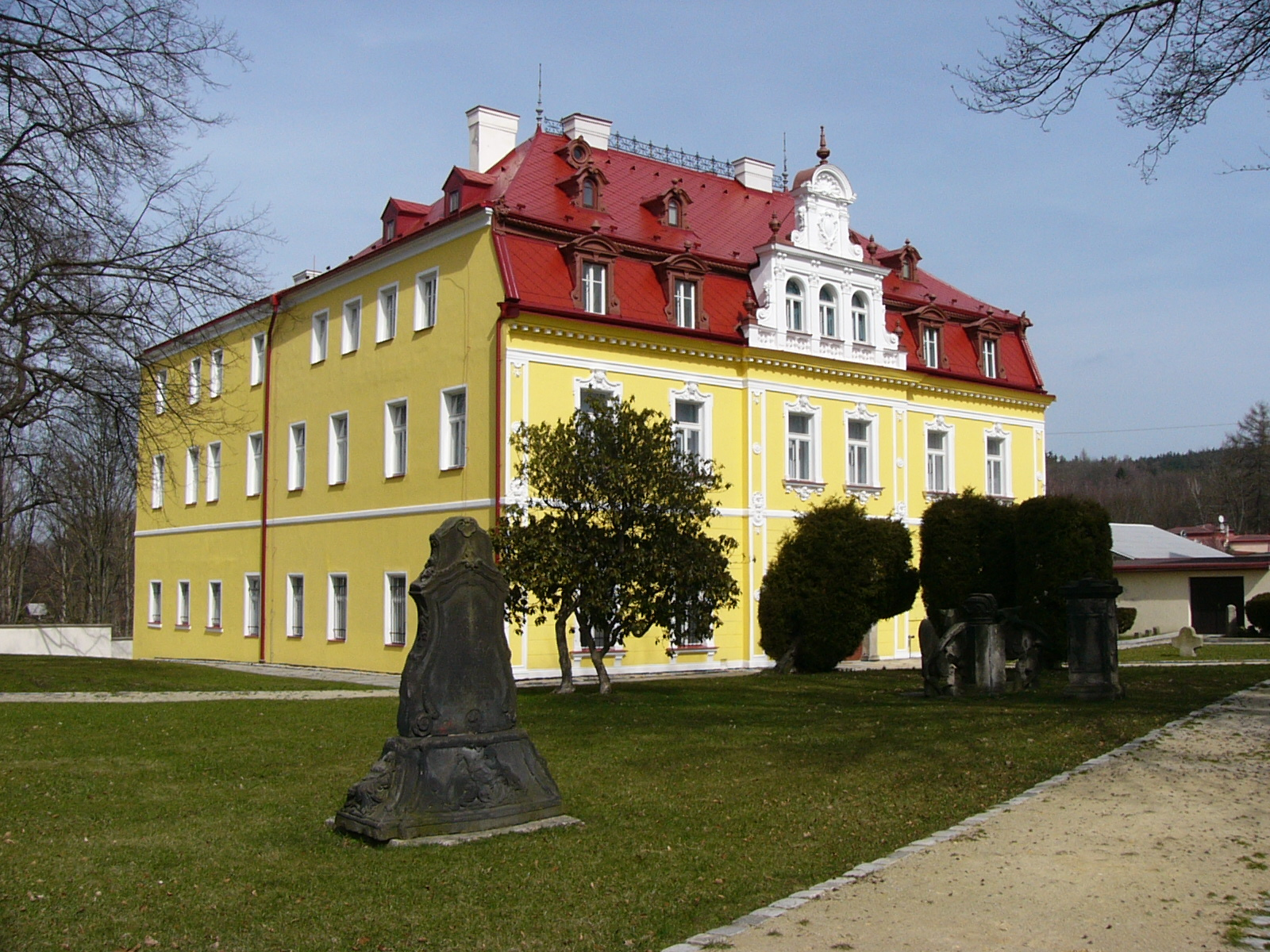
Aš Museum

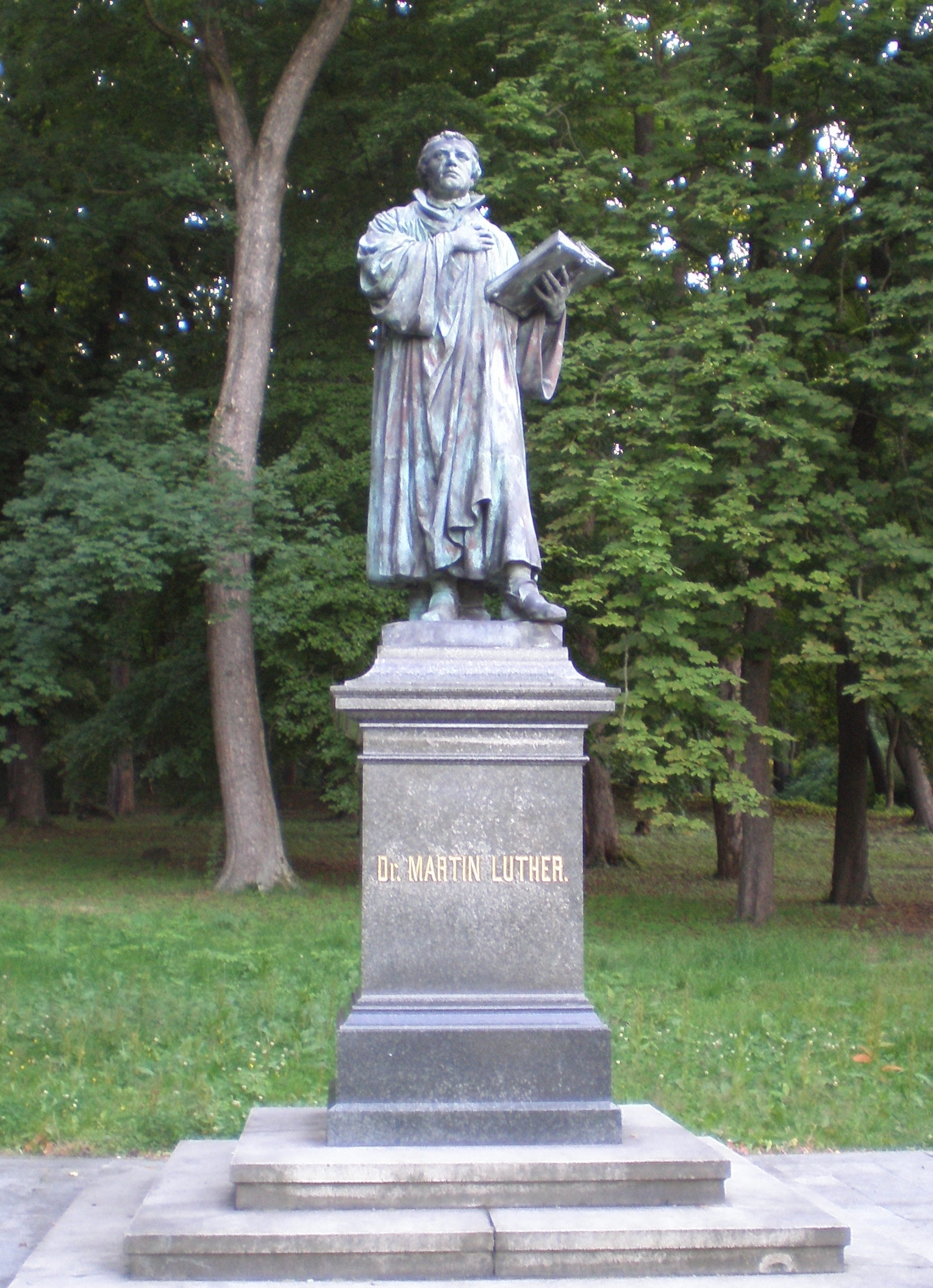
Luther monument

The main square of the town is Goethovo náměstí named after J. W. Goethe, who often visited the town. In the middle of the square is the Memorial of J. W. Goethe from 1932, designed by Johannes Watzal. The main landmark of the square is the town hall. It was built in 1733 in the Baroque style, but in 1814 it was burned down. It was built again in 1816, according to the original plans.

The Aš Museum was founded in 1892 and is subtitled "Ethnography and Textile Museum of Aš". It is housed in a building on the site of a former manor house, today called Zámeček ('little castle'). The most important textile collection is the collection of 22,000 pairs of gloves. Under the administration of the museum also operates "The stone crosses research society" which maintaints the central register of these monuments. The museum also includes gardens open to the public. Into the corner pillar of the garden is built the Salva Guardia stone relief with imperial symbols.

The town firehouse is a significant building from 1930 designed by Emil Rösler. In 2014, it was reconstructed. Today it houses part of the town museum.

The Evangelical Church of the Good Shepherd is located on the site of a former church from the 1480s. The original church was rebuilt in the Baroque style and only the tower was preserved.

The Church of Saint Nicholas is a Roman Catholic church built in 1867–1871 that replaced a late Baroque church from 1780. It has a 48 metres (157 ft) high tower.

The Memorial of Dr. Martin Luther was erected in 1883 and re-erected in 2008. It is the only Luther Monument in the country and in the whole of the former Austria-Hungary. It was located next to the evangelical church, which was one of the most important monuments of the region. The church burned down in 1960 and today is commemorated by perimeter wall and wooden cross.

On Háj, there is an eponymous observation tower. It was designed by Wilhelm Kreis and built in 1902–1903. The tower is 35 metres (115 ft) high.

Gustav Geipel Memorial from 1924 is dedicated to this factory owner and patron of Aš, who sponsored children, poor and old people. Gustav Geipel's villa from 1888 is an architectural monument.

== Notable people ==
- Sebastian Knüpfer (1633–1676), German composer
- Friedrich Wettengel (1750–1824), Lutheran theologian
- Andreas Leonhardt (1800–1866), Austrian composer
- Ernst Bareuther (1838–1905), Austrian politician
- Karl Alberti (1856–1953), German historian
- Emil Baumgärtel (1885–1939), Austrian politician
- Otto Jäger (1894–1917), German flying ace
- Wilhelm Ludwig (1901–1959), German geneticist
- Karl Fritzsch (1903–1945), German KZ-commander
- Hermann Fischer (1912–1984), German athlete and Communist resistance fighter against Nazism
- Karl Komma (1913–2012), German composer
- Herbert Bareuther (1914–1945), German flying ace
- Rudolf Hilf (1923–2011), German historian and political scientist
- Ernst Wilfer (1923–2014), German engineer
- Oskar Fischer (1923–2020), German politician
- Anton Bodem (1925–2007), German theologian
- Gerhard Hahn (born 1933), German professor of medieval studies
- Horst Tomayer (1938–2013), German writer and actor
- Markéta Zinnerová (born 1942), children's book writer
- Charly Höllering (1944–2009), German jazz musician
- Wolf Stegemann (born 1944), German journalist, author and poet
- Rüdiger Bartelmus (born 1944), German theologian and professor
- Milan Bokša (born 1951), football manager
- Petr Sepéši (1960–1985), singer
- Jiří Plíšek (born 1972), football player and manager
- Lukáš Rešetár (born 1984), futsal player
- Lenka Marušková (born 1985), athlete
- Jiří Sekáč (born 1992), ice hockey player

== Twin towns – sister cities ==
Aš is twinned with:

- Fiumefreddo di Sicilia, Italy
- Marktbreit, Germany
- Oelsnitz, Germany
- Plauen, Germany
- Rehau, Germany

== See also ==
- NSTG Asch
