= Baumgärtel =

Baumgärtel is a surname. Notable people with the surname include:

- Bettina Baumgärtel (born 1957), German art historian
- Elise Jenny Baumgartel (1892–1975), German Egyptologist
- Emil Baumgärtel (1885–1939), Austrian politician
- Fabian Baumgärtel (born 1989), German footballer
- Tilman Baumgärtel (born 1966), German author and journalist
- Tilo Baumgärtel (born 1972), German painter
