= Nebesa =

Nebesa (Czech "skies", Russian Небеса "heaven") may refer to:

- Nebesa, Aš, village in Czech Republic
- Nebesa, book by John the Exarch one of the first non-liturgical Slavonic books
- Nebesa, album by Marina Kapuro
