= Gerhard Hahn =

Gerhard Hahn may refer to:

- Gerhard Hahn (theologian) (1901–1943), German theologian; Spiritual Vice President of the Evangelical-Lutheran Church of Hanover
- Gerhard Hahn (Germanist) (born 1933), German Germanist and medievalist
- Gerhard Hahn (director) (born 1946), German film director and producer of Asterix Conquers America etc.
- Gerhard Hahn (astronomer), planetary astronomer at Uppsala Observatory, deceased, see 5335 Damocles
- Gerhard Hahn (palaeontologist) (1933-2023), German paleontologist
