= Vernéřov (Aš) =

- Municipal part of Aš
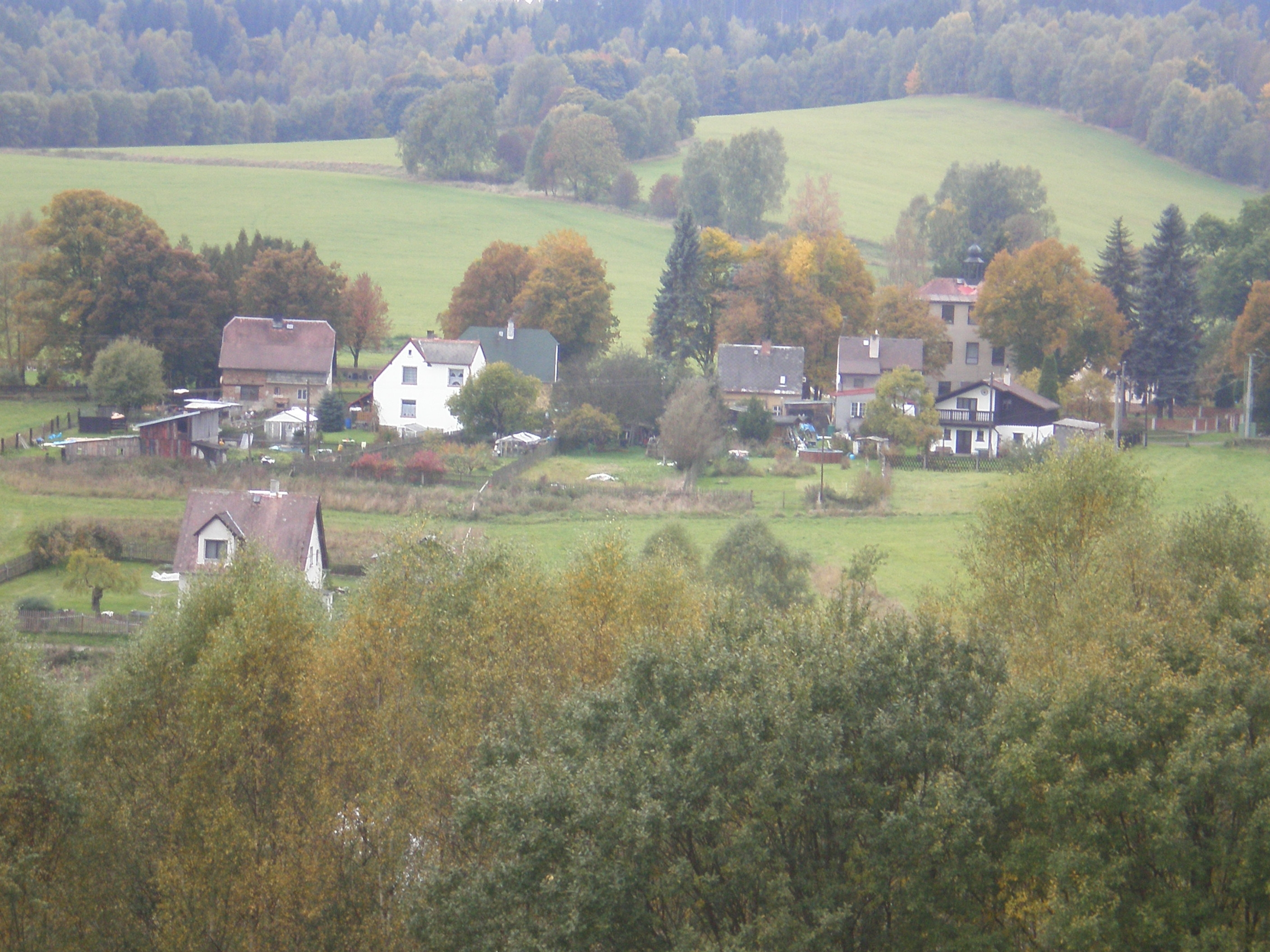
- Interactive map of Vernéřov
- Coordinates: 50°13′14″N 12°13′53″E
- Country: Czech Republic
- Region: Karlovy Vary
- District: Cheb
- Municipality: Aš
- First mentioned: 1395

Area
  - Total: 8.55 km^{2} (3.30 sq mi)

Population (2021)
  - Total: 155
  - Density: 18.1/km^{2} (47.0/sq mi)
- Time zone: UTC+1 (CET)
  - Summer (DST): UTC+2 (CEST)
- Postal code: 352 01

Vernéřov (German: Wernersreuth) is a village and municipal part of Aš in the Karlovy Vary Region of the Czech Republic. With about 160 inhabitants, it is the third largest municipal part of Aš.

In the village there is a market, restaurant, bus stop and a few ponds.

== History ==
Vernéřov was first mentioned in 1395. From 1490 to the early 18th century tin, gold and silver were mined in the nearby mines.

== Geography ==
Vernéřov lies 3 kilometres east from Aš, about 602 meters above sea level. It neighbours with Aš to the west, with Nebesa to the south, with Horní Paseky to the east and with Dolní Paseky to the north. The river Bílý Halštrov flows through the village.

== Demographics ==
Historical population

Year	Pop.	±%
1869	1,091	—
1880	1,061	−2.7%
1890	1,020	−3.9%
1900	1,071	+5.0%
1910	1,257	+17.4%
1921	1,058	−15.8%
1930	1,151	+8.8%
1950	225	−80.5%

Year	Pop.	±%
1961	186	−17.3%
1970	141	−24.2%
1980	117	−17.0%
1991	104	−11.1%
2001	106	+1.9%
2011	123	+16.0%
2021	155	+26.0%

Source: Censuses

== Landmarks ==
- World War I Memorial,
- School building,
- Petrova studánka (Fountain of Peter) from 1912.

== Gallery ==
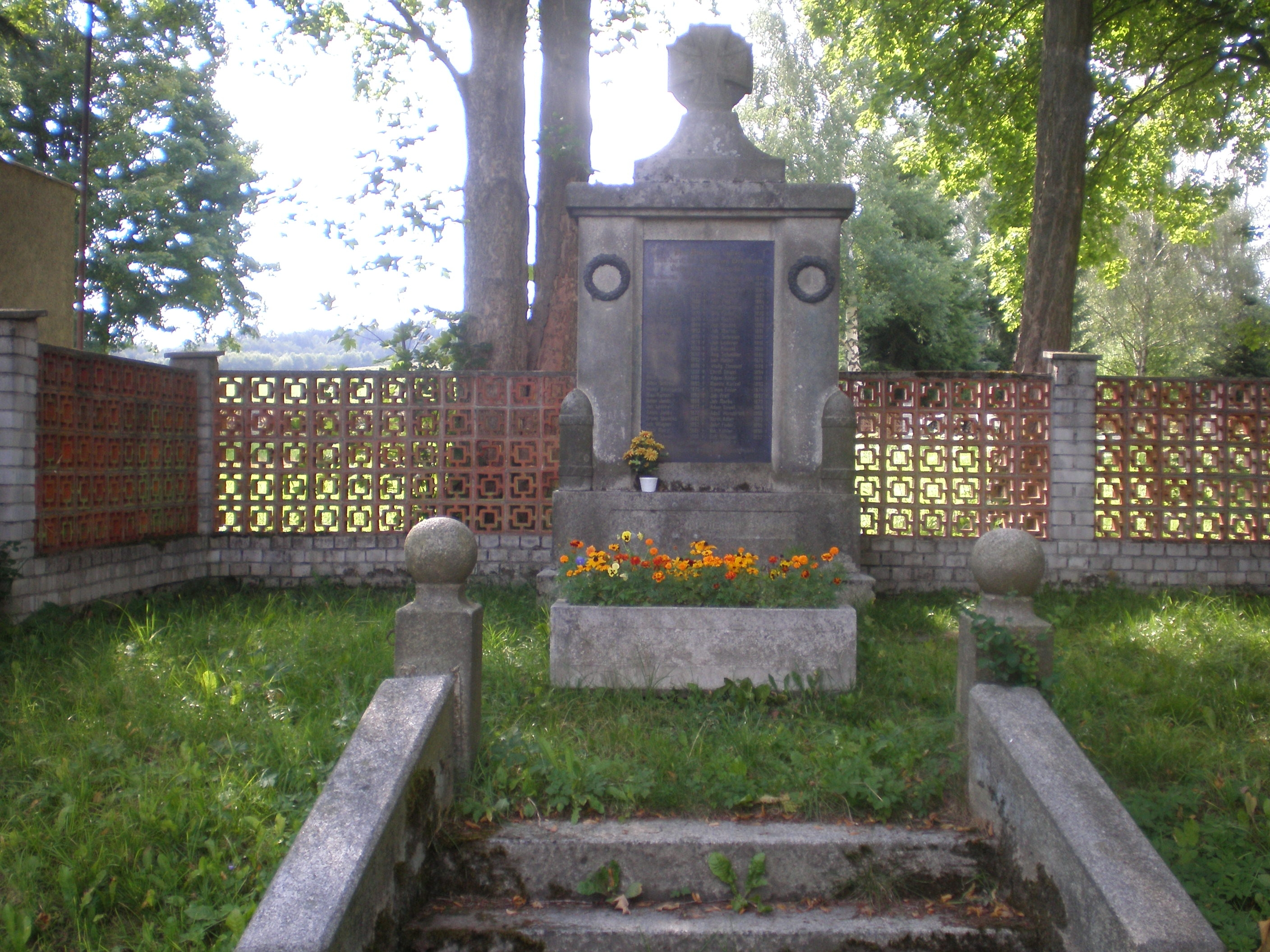
WW1 Memorial.

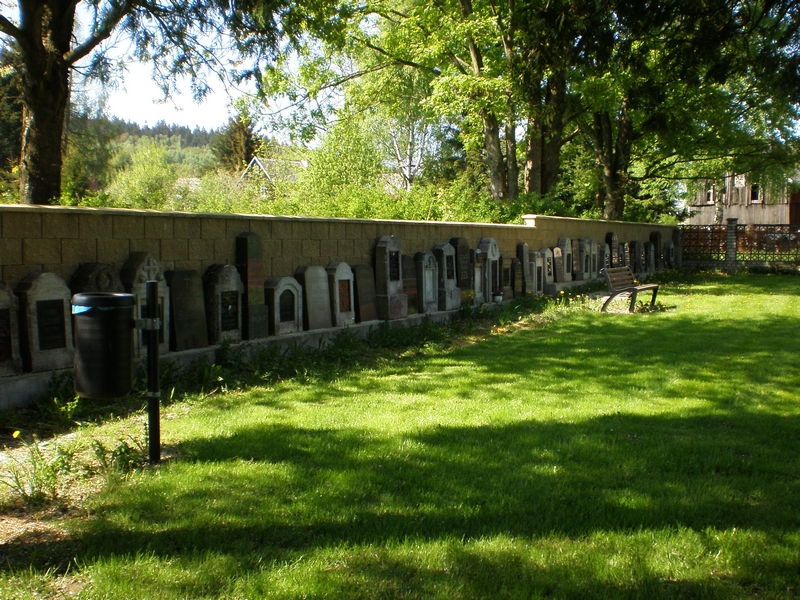
Old cemetery.
