= Nový Žďár =

- Municipal part of Aš
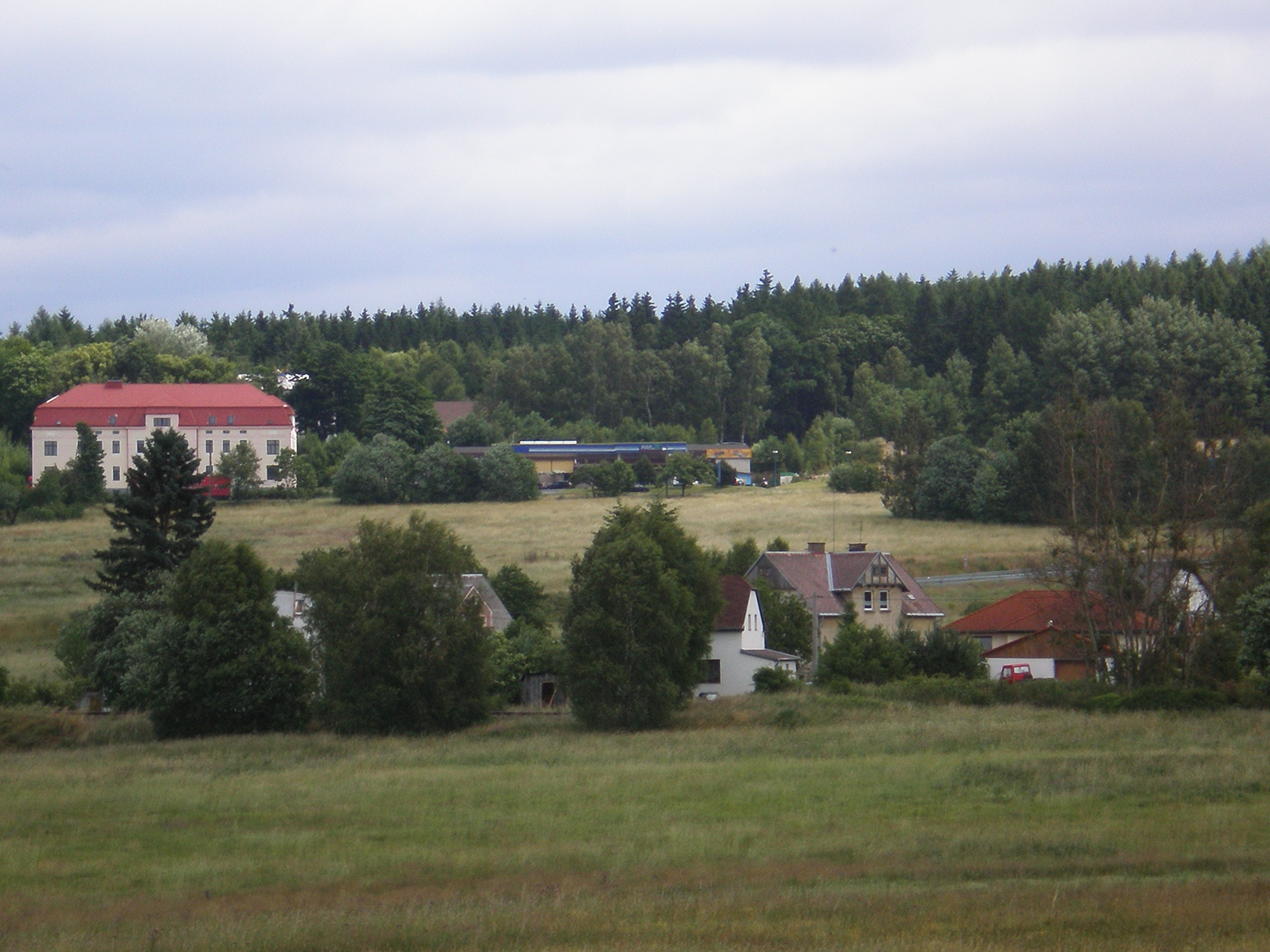
- Interactive map of Nový Žďár
- Coordinates: 50°11′39″N 12°12′35″E
- Country: Czech Republic
- Region: Karlovy Vary
- District: Cheb
- Municipality: Aš
- First mentioned: 1569

Area
  - Total: 6.66 km^{2} (2.57 sq mi)

Population (2021)
  - Total: 32
  - Density: 4.8/km^{2} (12/sq mi)
- Time zone: UTC+1 (CET)
  - Summer (DST): UTC+2 (CEST)
- Postal code: 352 01

Nový Žďár (German: Neuenbrand) is a village and municipal part of Aš in the Karlovy Vary Region of the Czech Republic. It has about 30 inhabitants.

== Etymology ==
In Czech, Nový means New. Word Žďár is from žďárovat, which means burn out the roots

== History ==
Nový Žďár was first mentioned in 1569, as a feudatory of the Zedtwitz.

== Geography ==
Nový Žďár lies 2,5 kilometres south from Aš, about 628 meters above sea level. It neighbour with Aš to the north and with Nebesa to the east. To the west there is the border with Germany. Most of the surrounding area is covered by forests.

== Demographics ==
Historical population

Year	Pop.	±%
1869	313	—
1880	291	−7.0%
1890	283	−2.7%
1900	274	−3.2%
1910	258	−5.8%
1921	213	−17.4%
1930	380	+78.4%
1950	90	−76.3%

Year	Pop.	±%
1961	43	−52.2%
1970	44	+2.3%
1980	28	−36.4%
1991	27	−3.6%
2001	24	−11.1%
2011	41	+70.8%
2021	32	−22.0%

Source: Censuses

== Landmarks ==
- Historical boundary marker with coat-of-arms of the Zedtwitz (Aš-region, Bohemia) and Lindenfels (from Erkersreuth, Bavaria) from 1718-1754.

== Gallery ==
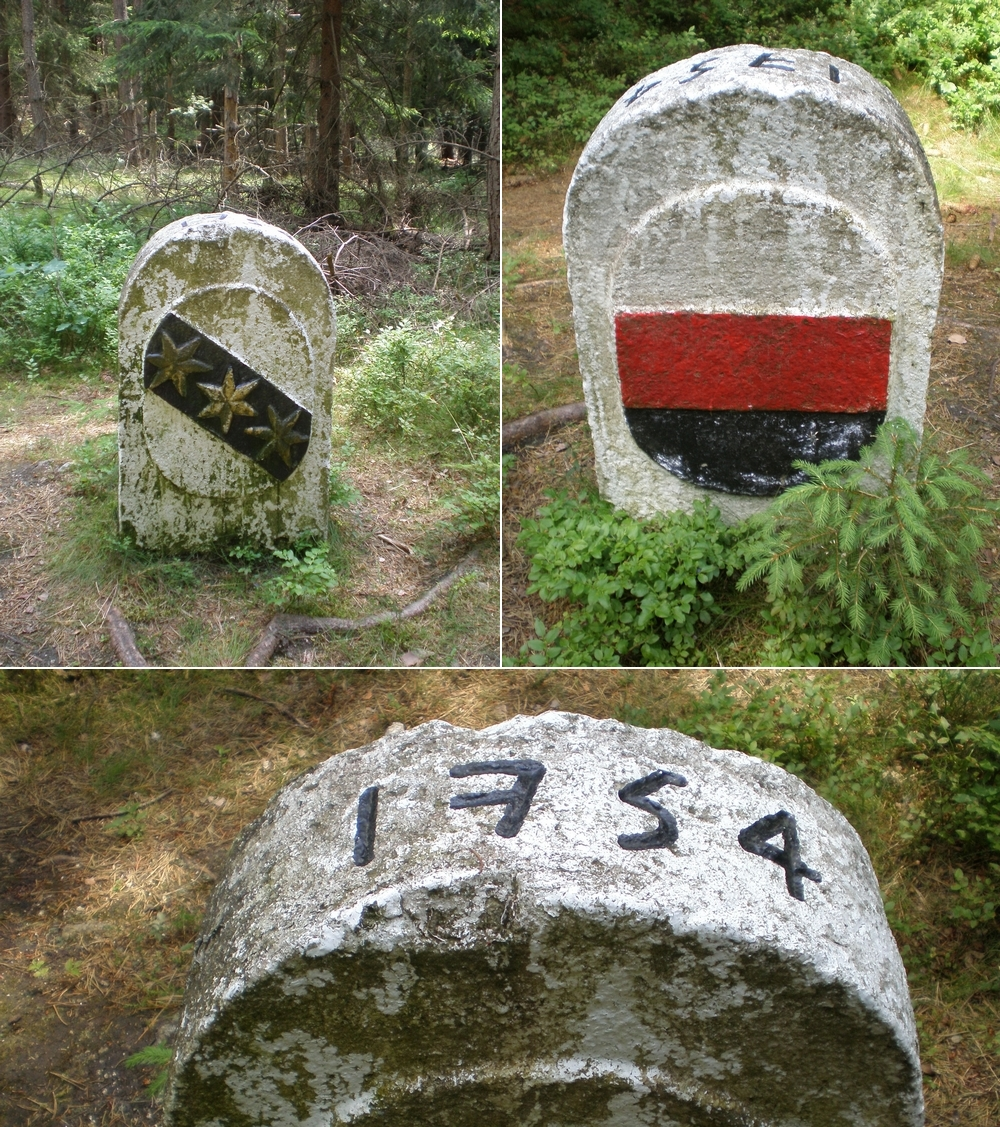
One of boundary markers. This is from 1754.

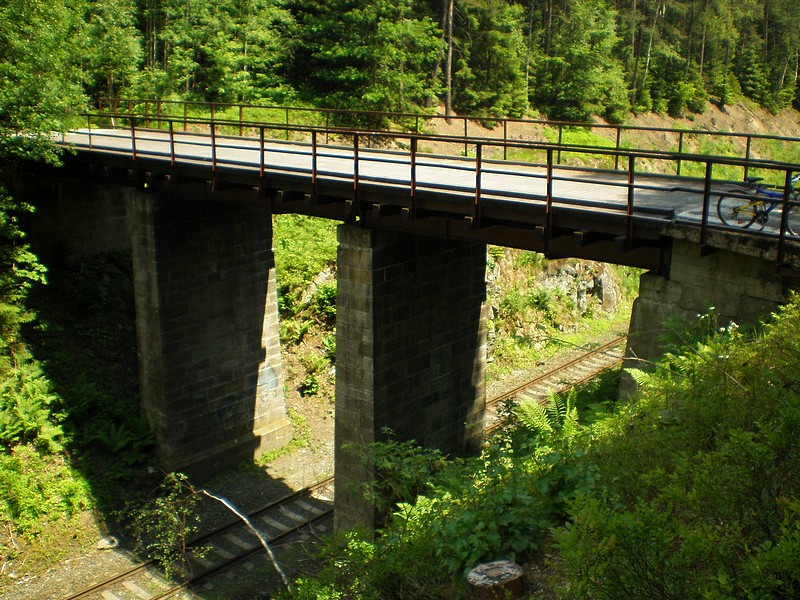
Bridge via railway.
