= Friedrich Wettengel =

Bohemian Lutheran theologian

Friedrich Traugott Wettengel (9 February 1750, in Asch, Austria-Hungary (now Aš, Czech Republic) – 24 June 1824, in Greiz, Germany) was a Bohemian Lutheran theologian.

== Life ==
The son of the Reichsadlich-Zedtwitz court administrator Johann Adam Wettengel and his wife Johanne Sophie Steidel, Friedrich Wettengel received his education first in his parents' house. After getting into public school in his native town for his first school lessons, he came under the guidance of a tutor with the necessary scientific knowledge for Wettengel's first year of high school in 1765 was included in the local courts. There he gave the proofs of his lectureship in Latin and Greek language three times in public school examinations. At the University of Jena in 1768, he devoted himself to theological and philosophical studies, which he completed in 1770 at the University of Erlangen. There, he was influenced by Georg Friedrich Seiler to pursue an education in science.

In 1771, he earned his master's degree and was a little later the tutor to the Zedtwitz noble family in Nentschau. The encouragement during one of his preaching sermons had given him the favor of Colonel von Falkenstein. Recommended by von Falkenstein, Wettengel went to Greiz in 1775, where he was appointed chaplain for and by Heinrich XI, Prince Reuss of Greiz. In 1780, he became a court preacher and the directorate of the orphanage there. In 1792, he was the superintendent and the first Konsistorialassessor. For a number of years, his restless activity had proved itself, especially in 1792 by the establishment of a seminar for preachers and school teachers. As an old believer, he had prevented vocal reform in Greiz in 1806. In April 1824 he was awarded, in recognition of his services, the creation of a church council. A hemorrhage in that year, however, ended his life.

== Personal life ==
Wettengel was married twice. On 15 February 1784, he married Juliana Barbara Catharina (1758 – 28 February 1784, Greiz), the daughter of Johann Christian von Maunz in Regensburg. After being widowed, he married again in 1796 to Christiane Friedericke (11 April 1766, Plauen – 28 February 1848, Greiz), the daughter of the Plauen tax collector Johann Benjamin Eberhardt. After the death of their son, Friedrich Wilhelm Traugott Wettengel (4 August 1800, Greiz – 12 March 1843), Friedericke donated 5000 Reichstaler to the poor and children's baths.

== Work ==
Wettengel, who had a thorough knowledge of the various branches of theological knowledge and in the older languages, acquired a name in his time as a popular speaker in the pulpit. This is documented especially his published sermons from 1779 on the sayings of Jesus on the cross. In 1790, with much ingenuity, he answered the question whether the symbolical books were a yoke for the free evangelical church or not. In 1808, he tried to meet the religiously inclined who, in his mind, were reluctant to believe that Christian ministries and public worship in their time was less necessary than at the time of the Reformation. He also made a name for himself as a poet.

== Works (selection) ==
- Der letzte Tag dieser Welt; in drei Gesängen. Greiz 1779
- Predigten über die Reden Jesu Christi am Kreuz, nebst zwei andern. Erlangen 1779
- Beitrag zur Geschichte des wahren Christentbums, an dem frommen Leben und seligen Sterben der Frau v. Wolframsdorf. Greiz 1760
- Wort der Liebe an den Herrn v. Bahrdt. . . 1780
- Auf den ruhmvollen Tod Leopold's, Prinzen von Braunschweig. Greiz 1785
- Trostgründe bei den Gräbern unserer Geliebten. Greiz 1785, 1791
- Der hohe Werth reiner Familienfreuden; eine Predigt. Greiz 1786
- Anleitung zum weisen und fohen Genusse des Lebens, zunächst für die Jugend, in Gesprächen und Erzählungen. Greiz 1789, 1792
- Sind die symbolischen Bücher ein Joch für die freie evangelisch-lutherische Kirche? Greiz 1790
- Josephs II. Schattenriß, gezeichnet von einem Ausländer. Frankfurt am Main 1790
- Gedichte und Lieder für Leidende. Greiz 1789
- Der hohe Werth eines Tempels, Predigt bei der Einweihung der nach Einäscherung von 1802 wiedererbauten Stadtkirche. Greiz 1805
- Lazarus der Arme. Greiz 1806
- Sind christliches Predigtamt und öffentlicher Gottesdienst in unsern Tagen minder nothwendig, als zur Zeit der Reformation? In Hinsicht auf die Meinung des Herrn Generalsuperintendenten Löfler in Gotha beantwortet u.s.w.. Greiz 1808
- Die Beschränkung der Ehen vor dem Richterstuhl der Religion und Vernunft betrachtet, eine unbefangene Untersuchung. Greiz 1810
- Geliebtes Greitz! Schaue den Ernst und die Güte deines Gottes! Predigt gehalten nach erfolgten Einschlagen des Blitzes in die Stadtkirche. Greiz 1811
- Es ist Friede! Eine Predigt. Greiz 1814
- Sieges und Todesfeier der in den letzten Kriegen gefallenen Krieger. Zwei Predigten. Zwickau 1819
- Aufruf an Christen zur würdigen Feier der Sonn- und Festtage. Zwickau 1819

== Literature ==
- Heinrich Doering: Die gelehrten Theologen Deutschlands im achtzehnten und neunzehnten Jahrhundert. Verlag Johann Karl Gottfried Wagner, 1835, Neustadt an der Orla, Bd. 4, S. 709, (Online)
- Paul Heller: Thüringer Pfarrbuch – Die reußischen Herrschaften. Evangelische Verlagsanstalt, Leipzig, 2004, ISBN 3374021794, Bd. 4, S. 1399
- Georg Christoph Hamberger, Johann Georg Meusel: Das gelehrte Teutschland, oder Lexikon der jetzt lebenden teutschen Schriftsteller. Verlag Meyer, Lemgo, 5. Aufl., 1800, Bd. 8, S. 478, (Online); 1812, Bd. 16, S. 206, (Online); 1827, Bd. 21, S. 525, (Online);
- Friedrich August Schmidt: Neuer Nekrolog der Deutschen. Bernhardt Friedrich Voigt, Ilmenau, 1826, 2. Jg. (1824), 2.Teil, S. 1161, (Online)
