= Ernst Bareuther =

Austrian-Sudeten German politician (1838–1905)

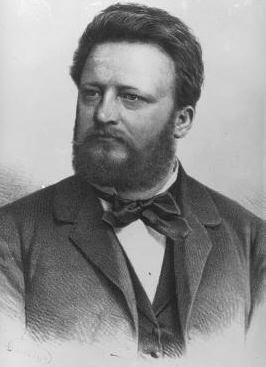
Lithograph of Ernst Bareuther

Johann Christian Ernst Bareuther (19 January 1838 in Asch, Austrian Empire – 17 August 1905 in Freiburg im Breisgau) was a Bohemian-Austrian politician.

Bareuther was born the son of Johann Christian Bareuther, a cloth manufacturer, and Sophia (née Just), daughter of Upper pastor Karl August Just of Asch. The sock manufacturer Johann Christian Wunderlich was his godfather. He studied in Prague and became a lawyer. In 1871, he joined the Czech national parliament and, in 1873, the Austrian Imperial Council. He was a co-founder of the Union of Germans in Bohemia. From 1882 to 1885, he was also a member of the Vienna City Council. He was a member of the Protestant community in Vienna and leader of Away from Rome!. Bareuther was an honorary member of Burschenschaft Teutonia Prag. From 1898 he was a member of Georg Ritter von Schönerer's pan-German Movement. He died in Freiburg, and was buried in his home town of Asch.

== Literature ==
- Helge Dvorak: Biografisches Lexikon der Deutschen Burschenschaft. Band I Politiker, Teilband 1: A-E. Heidelberg 1996, S. 50. (mit Bild)
- "Bareuther Ernst". In: Österreichisches Biographisches Lexikon 1815–1950 (ÖBL). Vol. 1, Austrian Academy of Sciences, Vienna 1957, p. 50.
