= Karl Alberti =

Czech educator

- Born: December 15, 1856; Asch, Austrian Empire
- Died: Bayreuth, West Germany
- Education: College of Education in Bielitz-Biala, Training school in Troppau
- Occupations: Teacher, Local historian
- Known for: Local history of Asch
- Notable work: Over 80 works on the history of Asch
- Father: Traugott Alberti

Karl Alberti (15 December 1856, Asch, Austrian Empire – 7 November 1953, Bayreuth, West Germany) was a Bohemian German teacher and local historian.

Alberti was the eldest son of 14 children of Asch's Evangelical superintendent Traugott Alberti. The pastor's family came in 1820 from the Saxon Vogtland to Asch. He attended the College of Education in the Bielitz-Biala, on completion of which he contributed to the related training school before he went to the training school in Troppau. In Vienna he was employed as a national and then as a teacher at the local Bürgerschule. Already at that time he worked as a writer, especially for the Bayreuther Blätter. In 1893, Alberti was the director of the first girls' elementary and grammar school in Asch. From 1921 onwards, he led the city chronicle of Asch. As a local historian, he presented over 80 works on the history of Asch, which dealt, among other things, with the stone crosses the area, the presence of Goethe in the region, and the history of the land around Asch, including Neuberg Castle.
