= Rudolf Hilf =

Rudolf Hilf (1 March 1923, Aš, Czechoslovakia – 20 April 2011, Hamburg, Germany) was a German historian, political scientist and expelled politician.

== Life ==
Hilf, born in 1923, served as a soldier in the Luftwaffe between 1942 and 1945. After the end of the war, his family was expelled from their homeland and settled down in Bavaria. He studied history at the Ludwig-Maximilians-Universität München, and, in 1951, advanced onto political science. After that and until 1959, he worked as a foreign policy speaker of the first speaker of the Sudetendeutsche Landsmannschaft in Germany, along with Rudolf Lodgman von Auen. From 1960 to 1966, he was the private secretary of Prince Max Egon von Hohenlohe-Langenburg, a representative of the Bohemian Hochadels. From 1967 to 1973, he was managing director of the national association of the Federation of Expellees. After that, he was a speaker at the Bavarian State Center for Political Education until his retirement in 1988. From 1995 until his death, he has been a member of the Sudeten German Council and the executive committee of the Bavarian State Group of the Sudetendeutsche Landsmannschaft.

In 1977, together with Josef Stingl, the former President of the Federal Labor Office, Felix Ermacora, Theodor Veiter, Otto Kimminich and others, he founded the International Institute of Nationality Law and Regionalism (Intereg). He was also the initiator of the German-Czech cross-border region "Euregio Egrensis", founded shortly after 1990. He was also an author of many books, studies, and articles.

== Awards ==
- Honorary citizenship of the city of Aš (1993)
- Sudetendeutscher Kulturpreis (2006)
