= Rüdiger Bartelmus =

German theologian

Rüdiger Bartelmus (born 8 January 1944, Aš, Reichsgau Sudetenland) is a Czech-born German theologian and a professor at the Institute of Old Testament Studies and Biblical Archaeology of Kiel University.

== Life ==
Bartelmus studied at LMU Munich, the University of Erlangen–Nuremberg, Heidelberg University, and the University of Zurich in Protestant and Catholic theology and philosophy. In 1969, he passed the First Theological Exam and so passed the entrance examination in the Evangelical Lutheran Church in Bavaria. From 1969 to 1974, he worked as a religion teacher at various schools in Munich. Only a year later, he was inducted into the countries' Council of Evangelical Lutheran Churches. He is a parson under the Landeskirche of the Evangelical Lutheran Church in Bavaria.

From 1974 to 1976, Bartelmus worked as an editor of Hebrew at the Protestant Theological. He was part of Faculty at LMU Munich in 1976 with a doctorate and, with Professor Klaus Baltzer, a doctorate in theology. From 1977 to 1993, he was a Senior Researcher for Languages of the Old Testament at the Protestant Theological. In addition, he supervised the Old Testament training of student teachers without classical language skills at the same place. In 1982, he received his habilitation to Dr. theol. habil., the teaching qualification for the subject "Old Testament".

From 1982 to 1989, he worked as a lecturer. From 1993 to 1995, he taught at the same place as professor of Old Testament and Biblical Oriental languages. In 1995, he was appointed as the professor of the Old Testament at the Theological Faculty of Kiel University.

In addition to his theological work, Bartelmus is a qualified high-tour guide of the German Alpine Club. For many years, he was a mountain guide for a mountaineering school. He is married and is the father of six children.
