= Andreas Leonhardt =

Austrian musician, composer and conductor

Andreas Leonhardt (19 April 1800, Asch, Bohemia (now Aš, Czech Republic) – 3 October 1866, Vienna, Austrian Empire) was an Austrian musician, composer and conductor. He was instrumental in the reorganization of the military music system in the Austrian Empire.

== Life ==
Leonhardt was the son of a cloth merchant. After his musical education in Eger, he entered the band of the infantry regiment "Kaiser Alexander" in Vienna in 1818. In his spare time, he studied music. With the regiment he was transferred to Naples in 1820. There he also took lessons with Niccolò Antonio Zingarelli, director of the Conservatory and conductor at the Naples Cathedral.

When the regiment was transferred to Prague, he remained a member of regimental music and studied composition with Václav Tomášek. He successfully applied for the approved position of the Regiment Kapellmeister at the time of the 27th Infantry Regiment, which was transferred to Bologna in 1829. With the 27th Infantry Regiment, he returned to Graz in 1835, where he left the army and took over as the director of the music association for Styria. When he was offered the task of the Austro-Hungarian army bandmaster in 1850, he went to Vienna and earned his services in the reorganization of the Military Music System and the founding of the Military Kapellmeister-Pensionsverein. He also composed works for symphony orchestras and military music.

His son was Gustav von Leonhardt (1838–1891), Secretary General of Austria's central bank Oesterreichische Nationalbank.

== Marches ==
- Alexander-Marsch, 1853, bearb. von Deisenroth u. a., Bote & Bock 1970.
- Kronprinz Rudolf–Marsch
- Prinz-Eugen-Marsch, bearb. S. Somma, Helbling 1975

== Literature ==
- Historische Märsche und sonstige Compositionen für das kaiserliche und königliche Heer. Wien 1895.
- Antonicek: "Leonhardt Andreas". In: Österreichisches Biographisches Lexikon 1815–1950 (ÖBL). Vol. 5, Austrian Academy of Sciences, Vienna 1972, p. 144.
- Werner, Probst: Armeekapellmeister Andreas Leonhard. Sein Wirken und Umfeld. In: Mit klingendem Spiel 18, März 1995, Nr. 1, S. 12–20
