= Kopaniny (Aš) =

- Municipal part of Aš
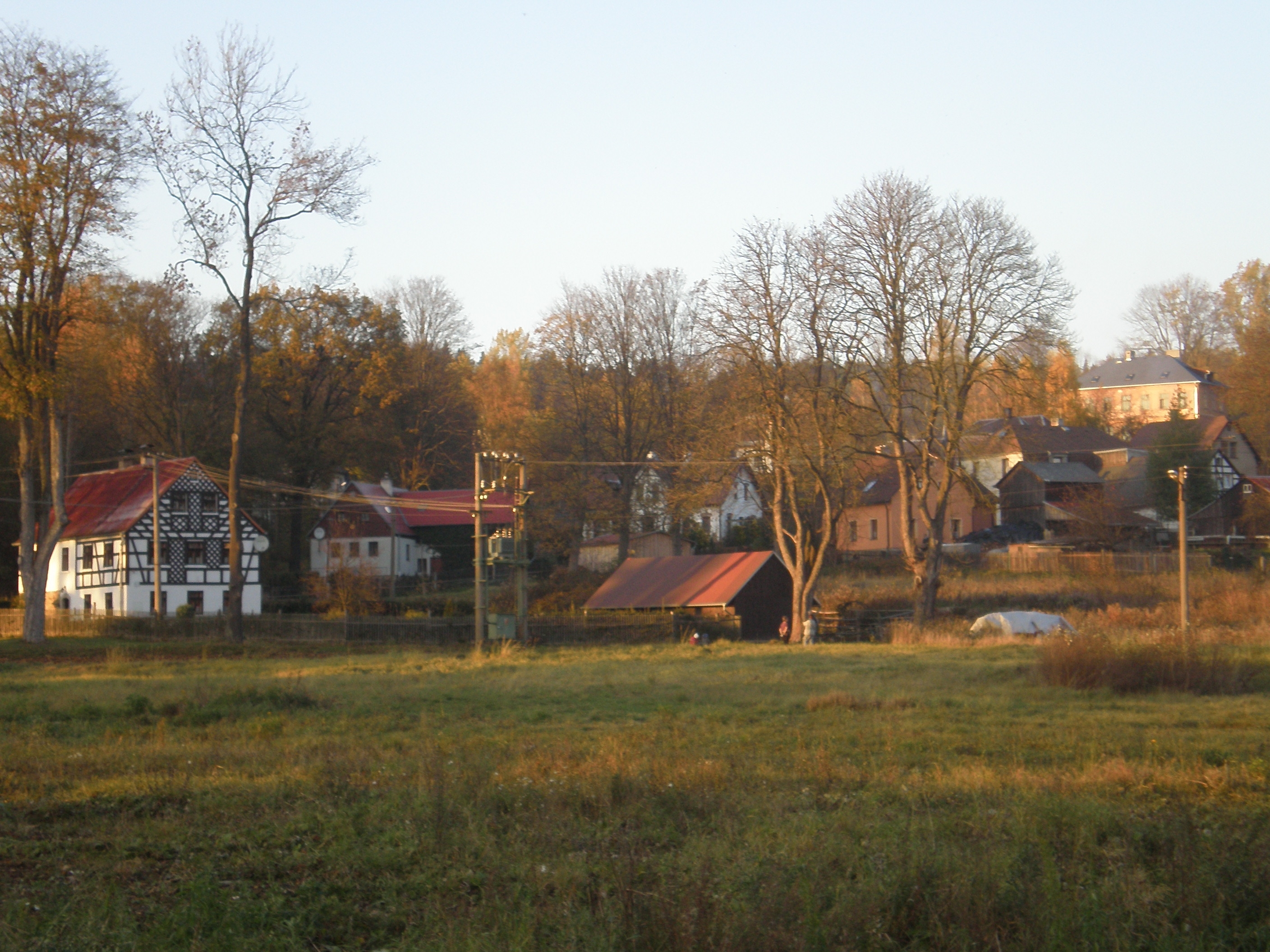
- Interactive map of Kopaniny
- Coordinates: 50°15′44″N 12°13′36″E
- Country: Czech Republic
- Region: Karlovy Vary
- District: Cheb
- Municipality: Aš
- First mentioned: 1315

Area
  - Total: 3.54 km^{2} (1.37 sq mi)
- Elevation: 673 m (2,208 ft)

Population (2021)
  - Total: 123
  - Density: 34.7/km^{2} (90.0/sq mi)
- Time zone: UTC+1 (CET)
  - Summer (DST): UTC+2 (CEST)
- Postal code: 35201

Kopaniny (German: Krugsreuth) is a village in Karlovy Vary Region, Czech Republic. It is one of the nine municipal parts of Aš. In 2021 the village had a population of 123.

== Geography ==
Kopaniny lies 5 kilometres northeast from Aš, about 673 meters above sea level, and is surrounded by forests.

== History ==
Kopaniny was probably founded in the 12th century, but it is first mentioned in 1315, as a property of the Feiltsch family from Sachsgrün. In the middle of the 14th century village belonged to Neuberg property, and in the late 14th century it was bought by the Zedtwitz.

== Demographics ==
Historical population

Year	Pop.	±%
1869	686	—
1880	714	+4.1%
1890	699	−2.1%
1900	848	+21.3%
1910	992	+17.0%
1921	885	−10.8%
1930	914	+3.3%
1950	258	−71.8%

Year	Pop.	±%
1961	219	−15.1%
1970	177	−19.2%
1980	126	−28.8%
1991	114	−9.5%
2001	94	−17.5%
2011	122	+29.8%
2021	123	+0.8%

Source: Censuses

== Landmarks ==
- Church of the Sacred Heart from 1890,
- Ruins of the Zedtwitz castle,
- German cemetery with Zedtwitz Tomb.

== Gallery ==
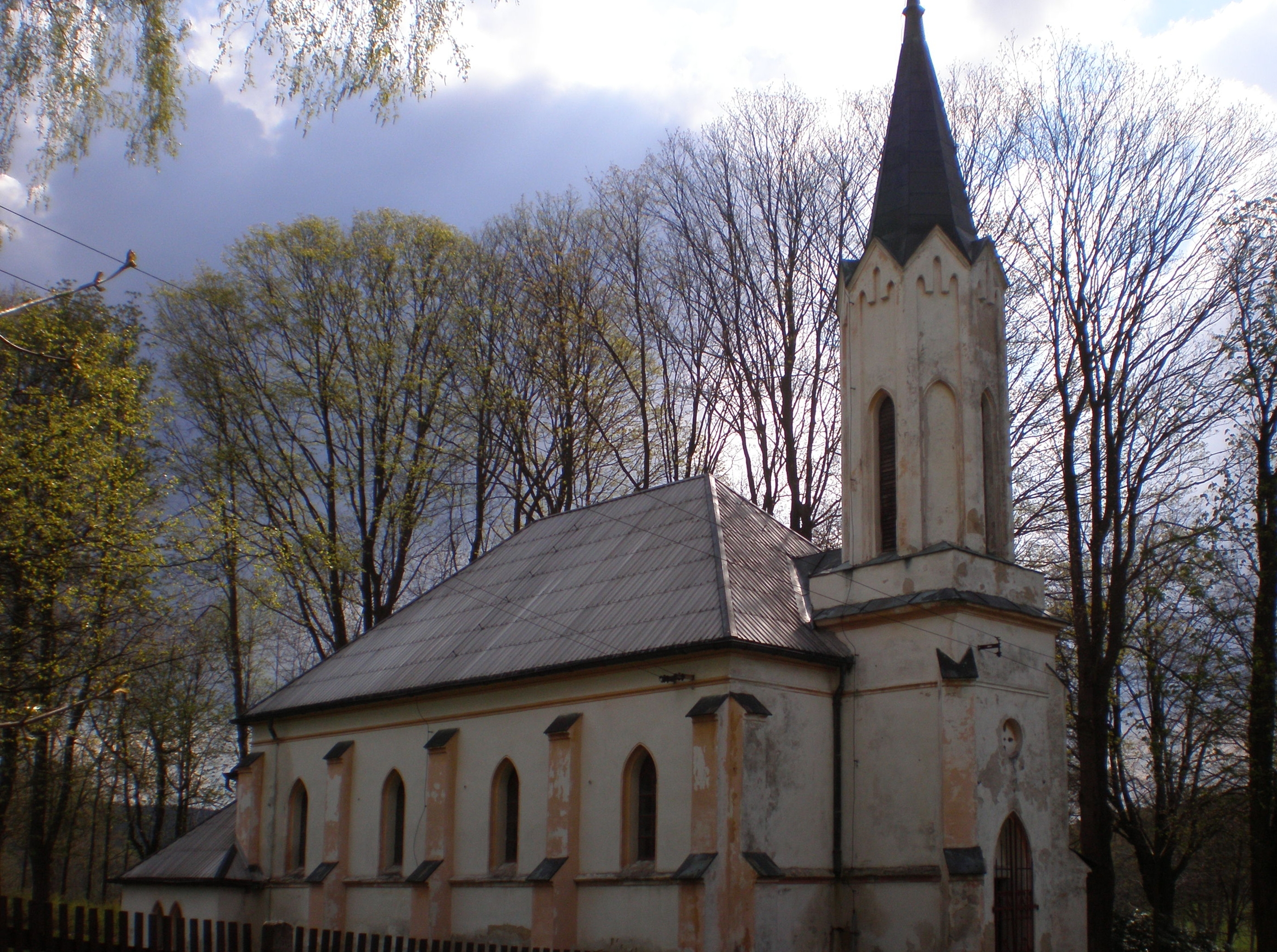
Church of the Sacred Heart.

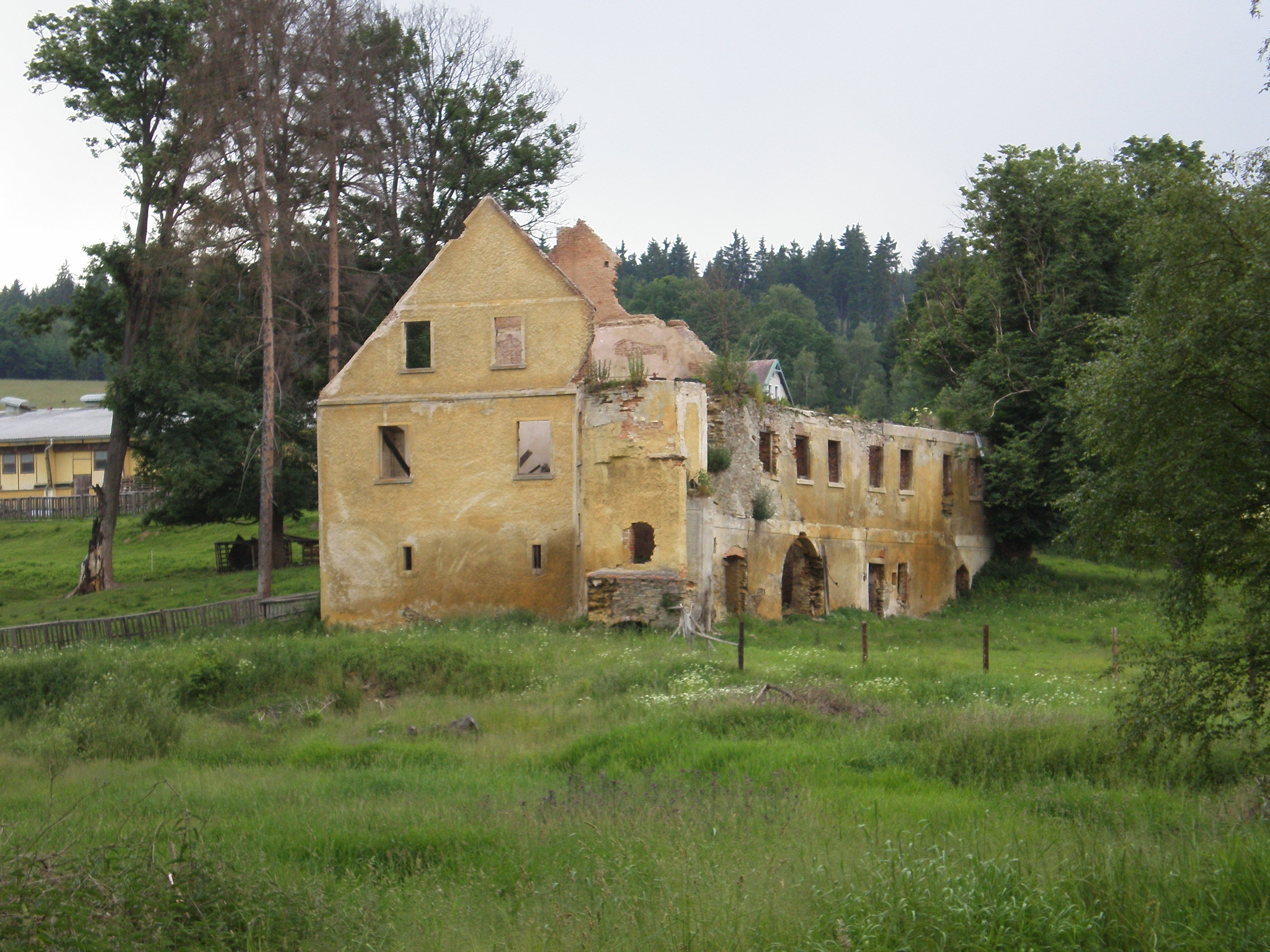
Ruins of Zedtwitz castle.

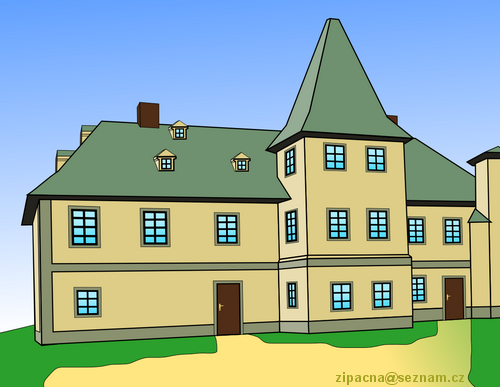
Zedtwitz castle in 1907.
