= Anton Bodem =

Anton Bodem SDB (7 August 1925 in Asch – 19 October 2007 in Penzberg) was a Catholic theologian and a former member of the Salesians of Don Bosco. Bodem initially was trained as a businessman. After the Expulsion of Germans from Czechoslovakia, he joined the Congregation of the Salesians of Don Bosco in Ensdorf in September 1948. In 1952, he placed first professed and studied theology at the University of His Order of the Salesians of Don Bosco in Benediktbeuern. On June 29, 1961, he received his priesthood. After further study visits to the University of Würzburg and the University of Mainz, he graduated in 1969 with a thesis on Thomas Cajetan to his doctorate. From 1970 onwards, he taught dogmatic theology at the university he graduated from; In 1981 he was recognized as a state Professor. In 1998, he retired. The Hauptlehr- and research of Bodem were next to the dogmatism the New Testament. He has published numerous dogmatic essays.

== Bibliography ==
- Anton Bodem: Das Wesen der Kirche nach Kardinal Cajetan, Mainz, 1971
- Wilhelm Albrecht, Anton Bodem, Horacio E. Lona: Die Osterbotschaft in der Theologie und im Religionsunterricht, Auer Donauwörth 1981, ISBN 3-403-01270-0
- Anton Bodem, Alois Kothgasser (Hrsg.): Theologie und Leben, Festgabe für Georg Söll zum 70. Geburtstag, LAS Rom 1983, ISBN 88-213-0075-7
- Anton Bodem: Hierarchie der Wahrheiten, Don-Bosco-Verlag 1991, ISBN 3-7698-0689-1
- Anton Bodem, Alois Kothgasser, Georg Söll: Die Mutter Christi: Beiträge zur Marienlehre, Don-Bosco-Verlag 1993, ISBN 3-7698-0761-8
