= Wolf Stegemann =

German journalist, author, and poet (born 1944)

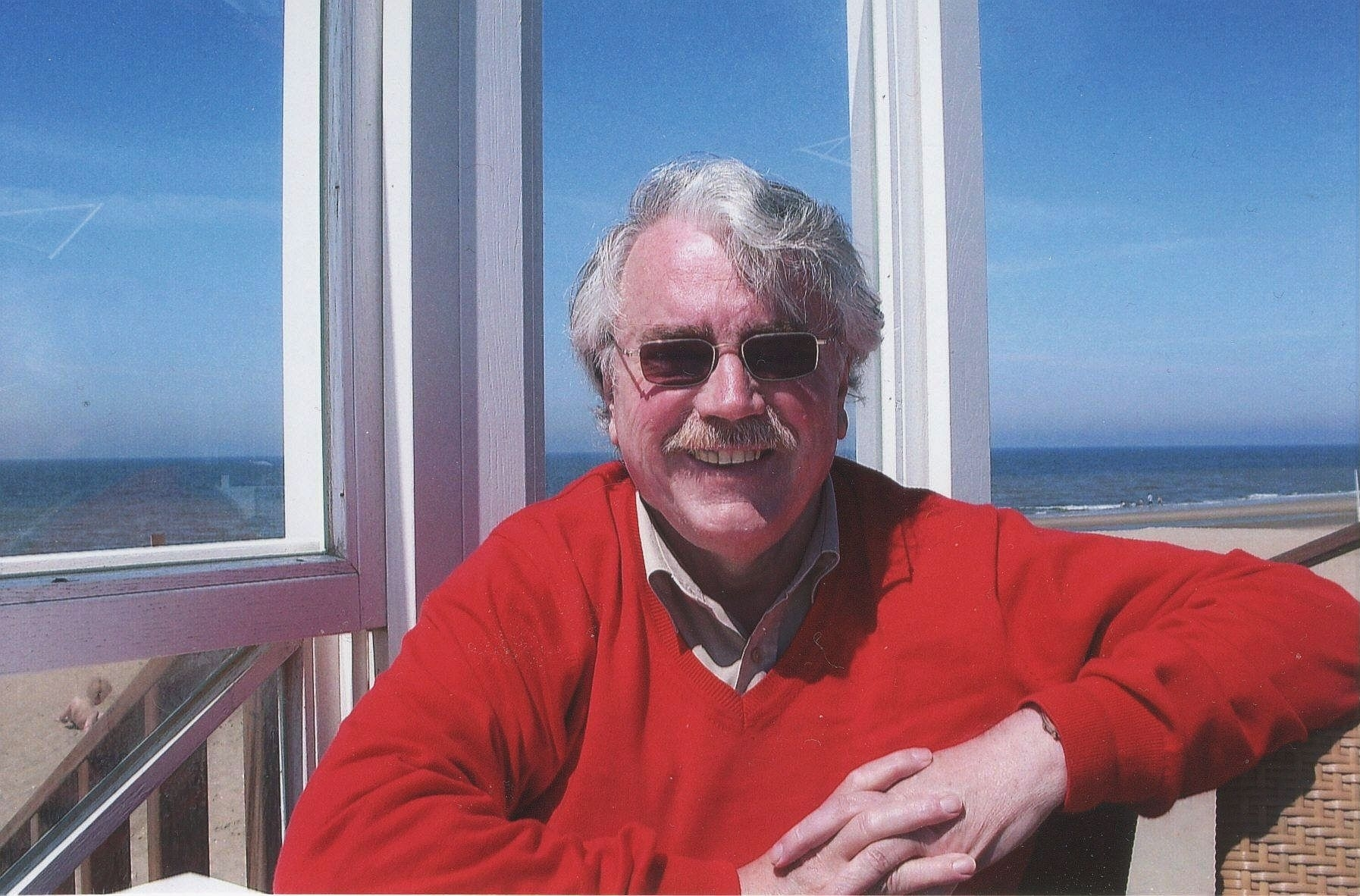
- Born: 2 October 1944 (age 81); Aš, Czech Republic
- Occupations: Journalist; Author; Poet
- Writing career
- Subject: Poetry

Wolf Stegemann (born 2 October 1944, modern-day Aš, Czech Republic) is a German journalist, author, and poet.

== Life ==
After finishing school in Rothenburg ob der Tauber and being a Volontariat in Nuremberg and Munich, Stegemann worked as a journalist in Athens and Istanbul for the Deutsche Presse-Agentur between 1970 and 1971 and as a freelance court reporters in Munich. From 1972 to 1975, he was a book editor at Bad Reichenhall, publishing the multi-volume series Sakrale Kunst in Bayern. From 1975 to 1980, he was an art editor in Gelsenkirchen in Dorsten (Ruhr Nachrichten) from 1981 to 1998.

He published, in 1972 and 1978, two volumes of poetry and short prose, and in the 1978 edition of the Gelsenkirchen magazine for literature and art sites in free association with Joseph Beuys, Jürgen Völkert-Marten, Klaus-Peter Wolf, and Michael Klaus and was a member of the jury of the Gelsenkirchen Art Prize, along with Heiner Jahn and Jörg Loskill. He published the Stadtansichten Gelsenkirchen. Von Menschen, Musen und Maloche.

Together with Dirk Hartwich, Stegemann founded a Dorsten-based research group which explored the Nazi period in the region. This group, along with other contributors, released a series of books from 1983 to 1987. In 1987, he was creative director and co-founder of the Jewish Museum of Westphalia in Dorsten and, in 1992, part of the German-Israeli Friends of Dorsten-Hod Hasharon. Stegemann received a lifetime achievement in 2005 by the abc Society for the Advancement of learning to read and write in the 3rd World eV the award of Change. Since 1970 his publications in have reached German-language magazines in Switzerland, Austria, Germany, Israel, USA, and on the radio at WDR, ZDF, Deutschland Rundfunk, Bayerischer Rundfunk, Südwestfunk, Österreichischer Rundfunk, and Deutsche Welle. He resides in Dorsten.

== Bibliography ==
=== Author or co-editor ===
- Sakrale Kunst in Bayern, 1974
- Standorte, 1978/81
- Stadtansichten Gelsenkirchen. Von Menschen, Musen und Maloche, 1978
- Kunst in unserer Stadt. Die Herz-Jesu-Kirche in Deuten, 1982
- Dorsten unterm Hakenkreuz: Die jüdische Gemeinde 1933-45, 1983
- Dorsten unterm Hakenkreuz: Kirche zwischen Anpassung und Widerstand, 1984
- Dorsten unterm Hakenkreuz: Der gleichgeschaltete Alltag, 1985
- Dorsten nach dem Hakenkreuz, 1986
- Dorsten zwischen Kaiserreich und Hakenkreuz, 1987
- Juden in Dorsten und der Herrlichkeit Lembeck, 1989
- Der Davidstern. Zeichen der Schmach, Symbol der Hoffnung, 1991
- Jüdisches Museum Westfalen, 1992
- Tisa von der Schulenburg. Fotos aus neun Jahrzehnten, 1993
- Lebensbilder. Porträts aus sechs Jahrhunderten Dorstener Stadtgeschichte, 1997
- Drei Jahrzehnte Verantwortung. Stadtdirektor und Bürgermeister Dr. Karl-Christian Zahn, 1999
- Holsterhausen unterm Hakenkreuz, Bd. 1, 2007
- Holsterhausen im Umbruch. Kaisers Krieg und Weimars Not, 2008
- Holsterhausen unterm Hakenkreuz, Bd. 2, 2009
- Um sechs am Marktplatz. Geschichten und Anekdoten aus Dorsten, 2015

=== Poetry and prose volumes ===
- Schreibmaschinentypen & sonst nichts, 1971
- Auf der Suche nach einem abgeschlossenen Raum, 1978
- Empor ins Reich der Edelmenschen. 1912 besuchte Hitler in Wien einen Vortrag von Karl May. Eine Erzählung nach einer wahren Begebenheit, 2000
- Heute mich, morgen dich. Eine Geschichte mit Scherenschnitten, 2007

=== Exhibition catalogs ===
- Alija. Die Wiedergeburt Israels in Dalis Bilderzyklus, Wanderausstellung 1993
- Igor Ganikowski: Zeit und Erinnerung, 1993
- Die Schulenburgs. Eine Familie zwischen Hochverrat und Widerstand, Wanderausstellung 1994
- Und neues Leben blüht aus Ruinen. Dokumentation zum Wiederaufbau der Stadt Dorsten, 1994
- Faszination Jerusalem. Stadt der Sehnsucht und der Hoffnung, Fotoausstellung 1994
- JOLENTA Dorszewska Pötting "Kräfte der Natur". Malerei., Impressions of Kashubia exhibition in the European Parliament 2003
