= Horní Paseky =

- Municipal part of Aš
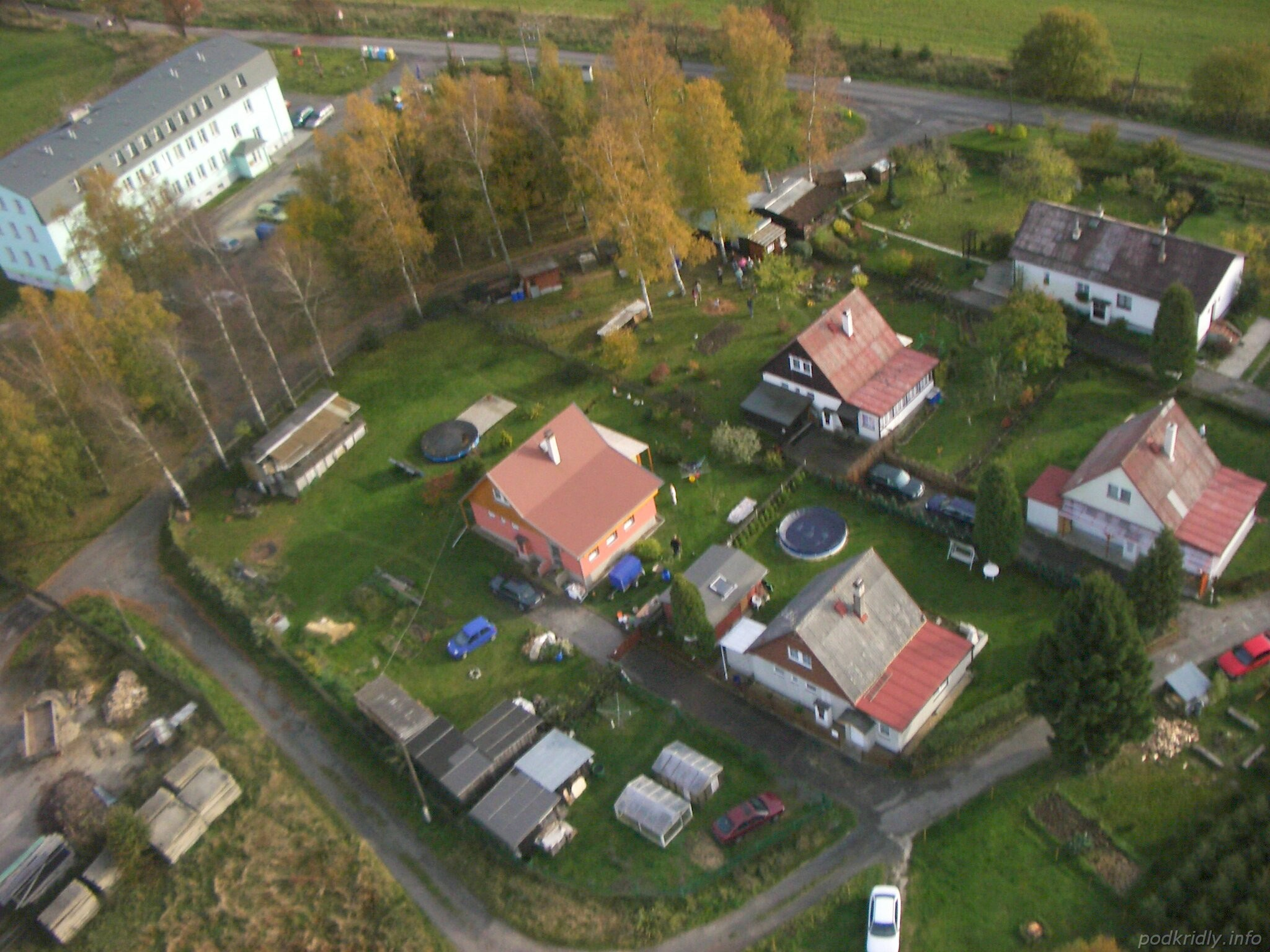
- Interactive map of Horní Paseky
- Coordinates: 50°13′21″N 12°15′27″E
- Country: Czech Republic
- Region: Karlovy Vary
- District: Cheb
- Municipality: Aš
- First mentioned: 1291

Area
  - Total: 4.26 km^{2} (1.64 sq mi)
- Elevation: 507 m (1,663 ft)

Population (2021)
  - Total: 71
  - Density: 17/km^{2} (43/sq mi)
- Time zone: UTC+1 (CET)
  - Summer (DST): UTC+2 (CEST)
- Postal code: 35201

Horní Paseky (German: Oberreuth) is a border village in Karlovy Vary Region, Czech Republic. It is one of the nine municipal parts of Aš. In 2021 the village had a population of 71.

== Etymology ==
Horní means Upper, and Paseky is plural for Paseka, which means Glade or Clearing. The German name, Oberreuth, has the same meaning as the Czech one.

== Geography ==
Horní Paseky lies 4 kilometres east from Aš, about 673 meters above sea level, close to border with Germany. Horní Paseky is surrounded by forests.

== History ==
Horní Paseky is first mentioned in 1291, as a property of the Neuberg. In 1344 the village was bought by the Zedtwitz.

In 1874 Horní Paseky became a separate municipality with ca 380 inhabitants. After a fire in 1917 the village has been almost depopulated. After World War II and the expulsion of Germans only 60 inhabitants remain in Horní Paseky. In 1950 the village was depopulated completely, being a part of the new restricted border area. In 1968 (following the Warsaw Pact invasion of Czechoslovakia) Soviet soldiers built a borderland base and few houses here. In 1990 the village was abandoned by Soviet soldiers, and until 1996 it is depopulated. People start returning to village from 1996. In 2001 the village had a population of 52.

In 2007 an Orthodox chapel of St. Hubert and St. George was built in the village. It is the westmost Orthodox building in the Czech Republic.

== Demographics ==
Historical population

Year	Pop.	±%
1869	369	—
1880	341	−7.6%
1890	336	−1.5%
1900	326	−3.0%
1910	342	+4.9%

Year	Pop.	±%
1921	289	−15.5%
1930	277	−4.2%
1950	30	−89.2%
1961	48	+60.0%
1970	-	—

Year	Pop.	±%
1980	-	—
1991	-	—
2001	52	—
2011	88	+69.2%
2021	71	−19.3%

Source: Censuses

== Gallery ==
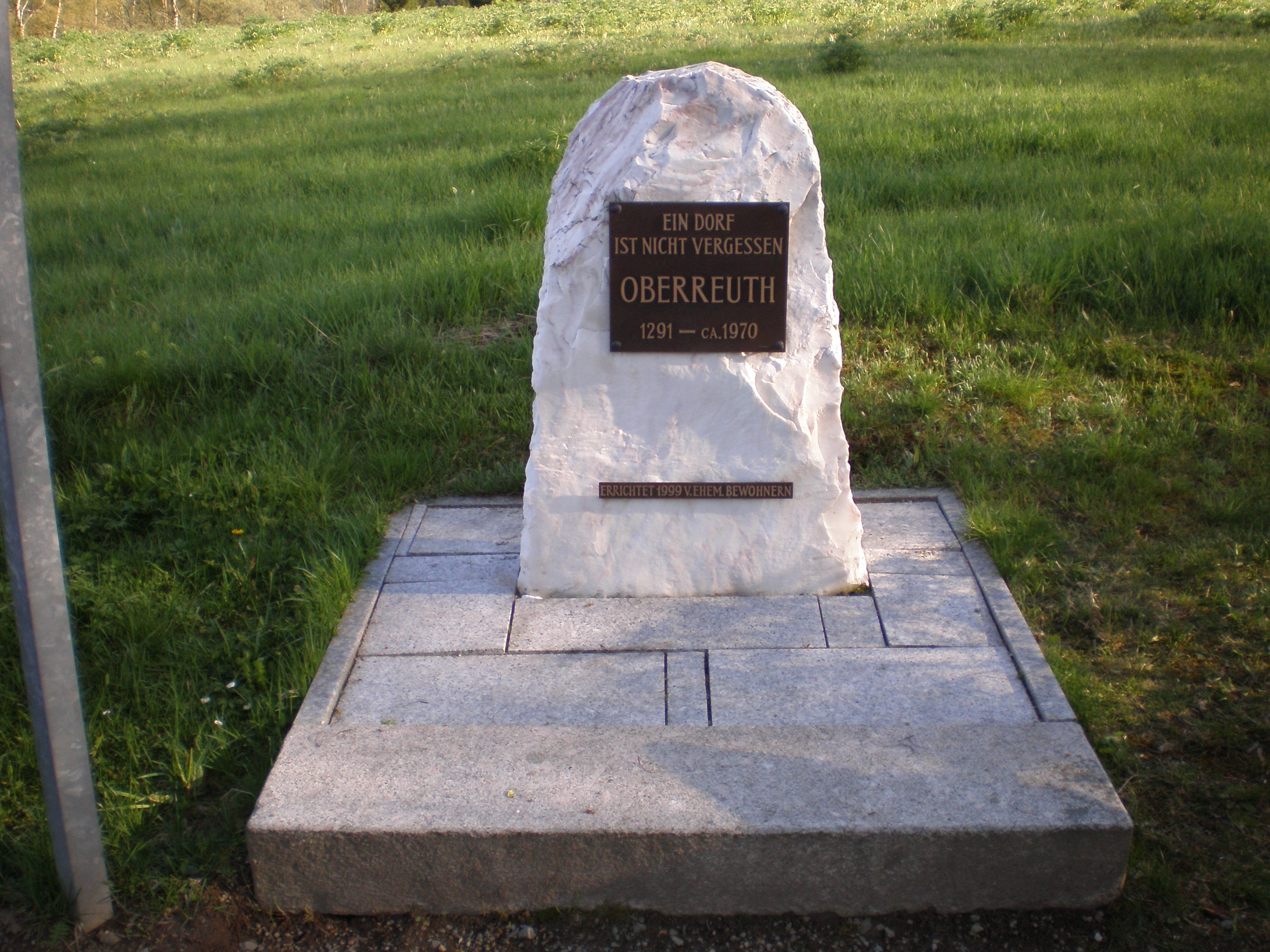
Horní Paseky Memorial on borderland.

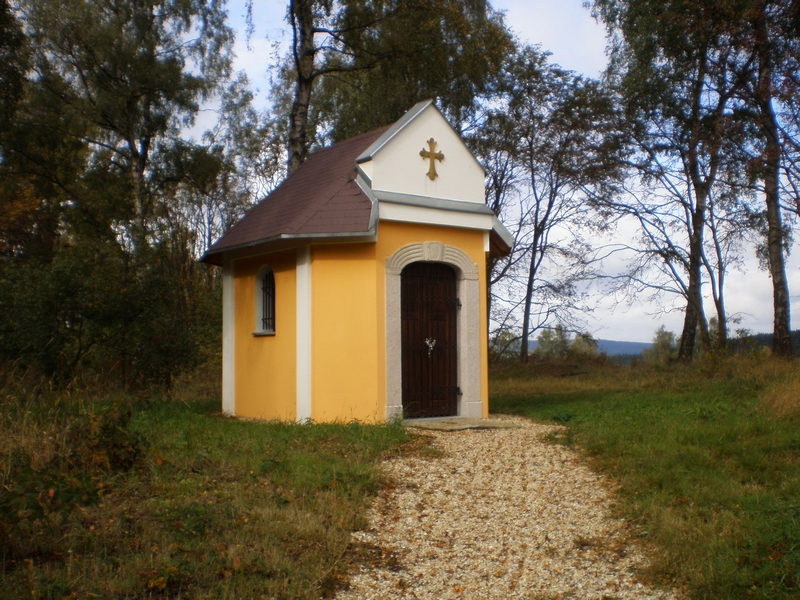
Chapel of St. Hubert and St. George

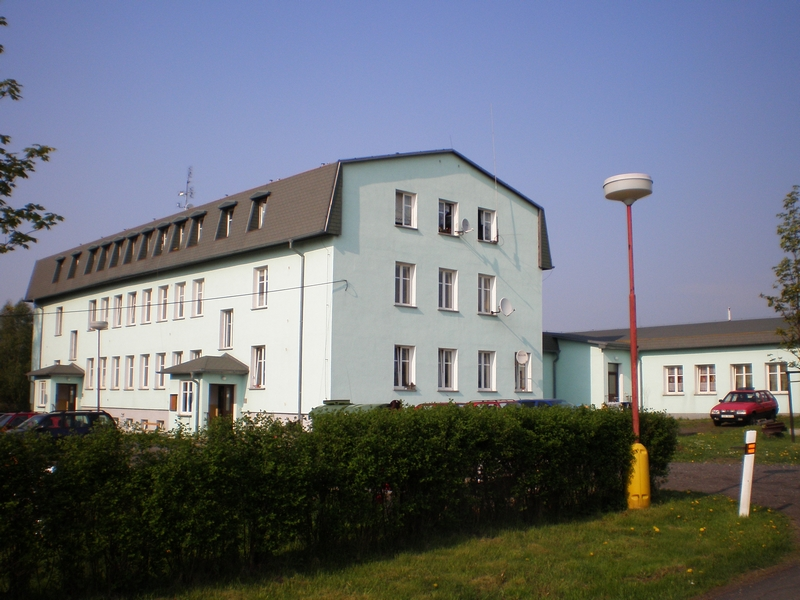
Soviet houses after reconstruction.
