= Emil Baumgärtel =

Austrian politician (1885–1939)

Emil Baumgärtel (10 January 1885 in Wernersreuth, Austro-Hungarian Empire – 27 September 1939 in Vienna, Austria) was an Austrian politician for the Social Democratic Party of Austria (SPÖ). Baumgärtel attended a two-class village school and was trained as a bookseller. He became a bookseller in Wrocław, Frankfurt, and Vienna. In 1919, he was vice chairman of the Workers' council for Upper Austria. From 1919 to 1925, he was a member of the Upper Austrian parliament, and also as a provincial Deputy Provincial. From 10 November 1920 to 17 February 1934, he was a Member of the National Council. He was also vice president of the Austrian Chamber of Labour. In 2001, a street in Linz was named after him.
