= Tilman Baumgärtel =

German journalist, author (born 1966)

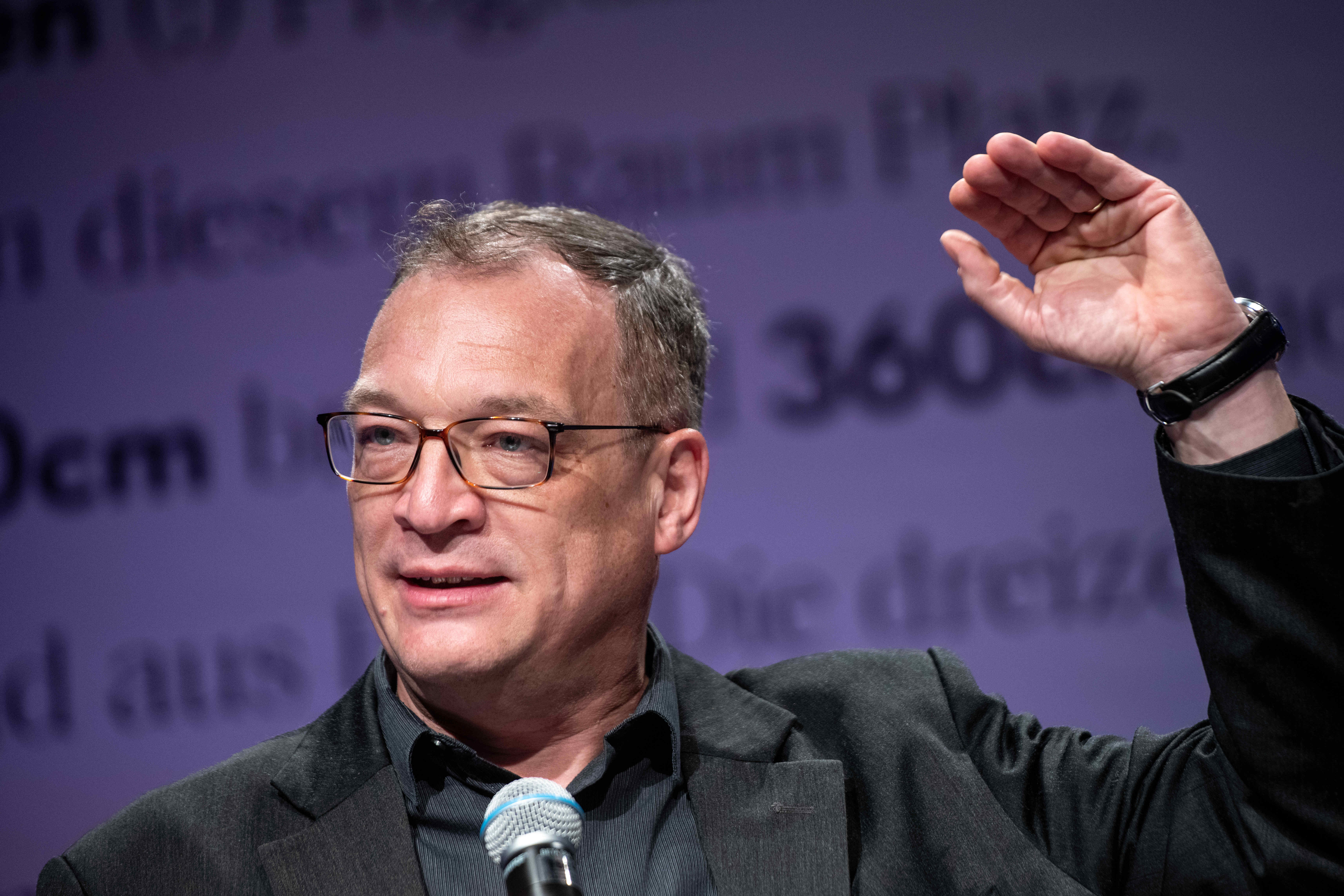
Tilman Baumgärtel, 2019

Tilman Baumgärtel (born 1966, Würzburg, Bavaria, Germany) is a German author, media theorist, curator and journalist. He is currently professor of media theory (department design) at the University of Applied Sciences, Mainz.

== Life ==
Tilman Baumgärtel has published books on media culture, Internet art, computer games, and Independent cinema in Southeast Asia. From 2005 to 2009 he taught at the University of the Philippines in Manila media and film studies. From 2009 to 2012, he taught at the Royal University of Phnom Penh in Cambodia at the Department of Media and Communication. Currently he is professor for media theory at the Hochschule Mainz.

His most recent publications is GIFs.

From 2018 to 2021 he was in charge of a DFG-research project on the art group Van Gogh TV and their documenta project Piazza Virtuale.

As a journalist he has been writing since the early 1990s for the Berlin daily die tageszeitung, Die Zeit, the Neue Zürcher Zeitung, Telepolis, the Berliner Zeitung and other German and international newspapers and magazines.

== Works ==
- Harun Farocki – Vom Guerillakino zum Essayfilm. Werkmonographie eines Autorenfilmer, Berlin 1998 (b-books)
- net.art. Materials for net art, Nuremberg 1999 (Verlag für moderne Kunst)
- net.art 2.0. New materials for net art. New material on art on the internet (bi-lingual: English / German), Nuremberg 2001 (Verlag für moderne Kunst)
- install.exe, Basel 2003 (Christoph Merian Verlag)
- games. Computer games by artists, Frankfurt / Main, 2004 (revolver)
- Sine cinema. Philippine-German Cinema Relations, Manila 2007 (Goethe-Institut)
- The Calamansi Cookbook: An Expat's Guide to Eating Well in the Philippines, Manila 2009 (Anvil)
- KON. The Cinema of Cambodia, Phnom Penh 2010 (DMC)
- DONTREY. The Music of Cambodia, Phnom Penh 2011 (DMC)
- STHAPATYAM. The Architecture of Cambodia, Phnom Penh 2012 (DMC)
- South East Asian Independent Cinema, Hong Kong 2012 (Hong Kong University Press)
- Schleifen. Zur Geschichte und Ästhetik des Loops, Berlin 2015 (Kulturverlag Kadmos)
- Pirate Essays. A Reader in International Media Piracy, Amsterdam 2016 (Amsterdam University Press)
- Texte zur Theorie des Internets, Stuttgart 2017 (reclam)
- Texte zur Theorie der Werbung, Stuttgart 2018 (reclam)
- Eintritt in ein Lebewesen – Von der Sozialen Skulptur zum Plattform-Kapitalismus, Berlin 2020 (Kunstraum Kreuzberg)
- GIFs, Berlin 2020 (Wagenbach Verlag)
- Van Gogh TV´s "Piazza virtuale". The Invention of Social Media at documenta IX in 1992, Bielefeld 2021 (Transcript Verlag), eBook as Open Access file here.
- Now and Forever: Towards a Theory and History of the Loop, London 2022 (Zero Books)
- Film reviews from Réalités Cambodgiennes, Kambuja and Nokor Khmer 1965 – 1974, self-published collection of historical sources on Cambodian cinema from the 1960s and 1979s, Phnom Penh 2025, digital file available .

== Exhibitions as curator (Selection) ==
Games. Computerspiele von KünstlerInnen, Hardware MedienKunstVerein Dortmund, 2003

Eintritt in ein Lebewesen, Kunstraum Kreuzberg, Berlin 2020

Is it Art or is it Internet, Vol 1., Upstream Gallery Amsterdam, 2021

Van Gogh TVs Piazza virtuale, Künstlerhaus Bethanien, Berlin 2021, Online-Version hier.
