= Dolní Paseky =

- Village
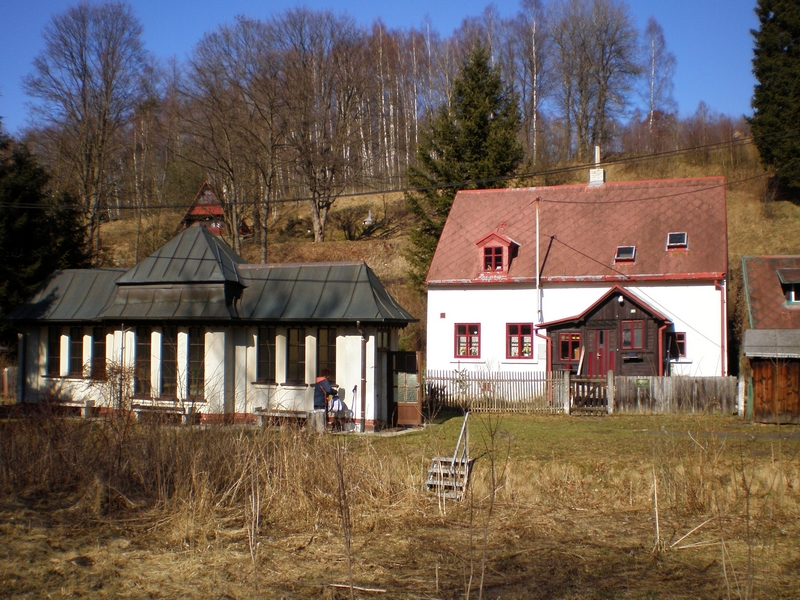
- Pavilion of mineral well

- Location in the Czech Republic
- Coordinates: 50°14′0″N 12°14′12″E
- Country: Czech Republic
- Region: Karlovy Vary
- District: Cheb
- Municipality: Aš
- First mentioned: 1315

Area
  - Total: 6.36 km^{2} (2.46 sq mi)
- Elevation: 549 m (1,801 ft)

Population (2021)
  - Total: 58
  - Density: 9.1/km^{2} (24/sq mi)
- Time zone: UTC+1 (CET)
  - Summer (DST): UTC+2 (CEST)
- Postal code: 352 01

Dolní Paseky (German: Niederreuth) is a village and municipal part of Aš in Cheb District in the Karlovy Vary Region of the Czech Republic. It has about 60 inhabitants.

For most part, the village serves as a recreation area for the whole Aš region. A pavillon with a mineral spring, built in 1930, is located in the village.

== Etymology ==
The name means 'lower glades' in Czech. The German name Niederreuth has the same meaning as the Czech one.

== Geography ==
Dolní Paseky lies 3 kilometres east from Aš, and is surrounded by forests. The White Elster River flows through the village. The Bílý Halštrov Reservoir is built here on the river.

== History ==
Dolní Paseky is first time mentioned in 1315, but probably was founded earlier (in the 12th century). First recorded owners were the Notthafft family. In the 15th century the village was bought by the Reitzenstein, and later by the Zedtwitz family.

== Demographics ==
Historical population

Year	Pop.	±%
1869	664	—
1880	642	−3.3%
1890	636	−0.9%
1900	634	−0.3%
1910	626	−1.3%
1921	491	−21.6%
1930	578	+17.7%
1950	99	−82.9%

Year	Pop.	±%
1961	101	+2.0%
1970	64	−36.6%
1980	57	−10.9%
1991	43	−24.6%
2001	39	−9.3%
2011	59	+51.3%
2021	58	−1.7%

Source: Censuses

== Sights ==
- Wood-frame houses
- World War I Memorial from 1931
- School building from 1839
- Pavilion with a mineral spring

== Gallery ==
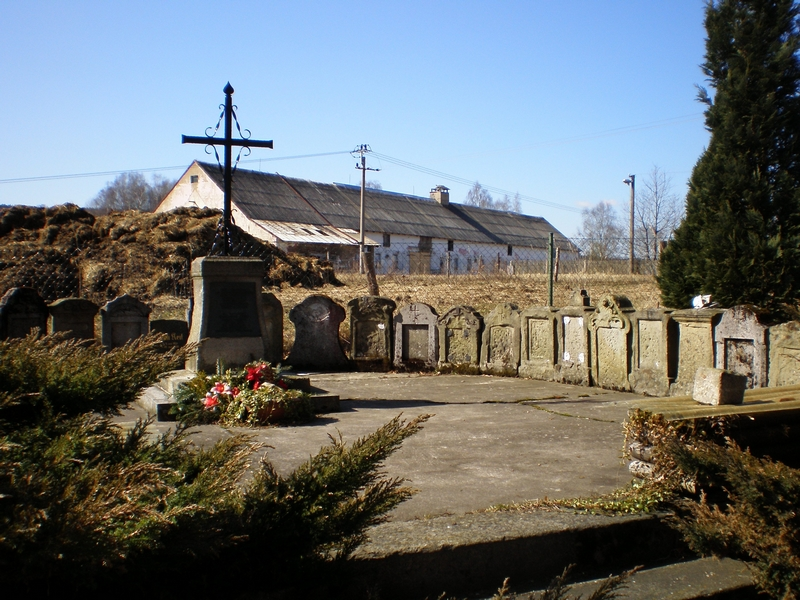
Old German cemetery

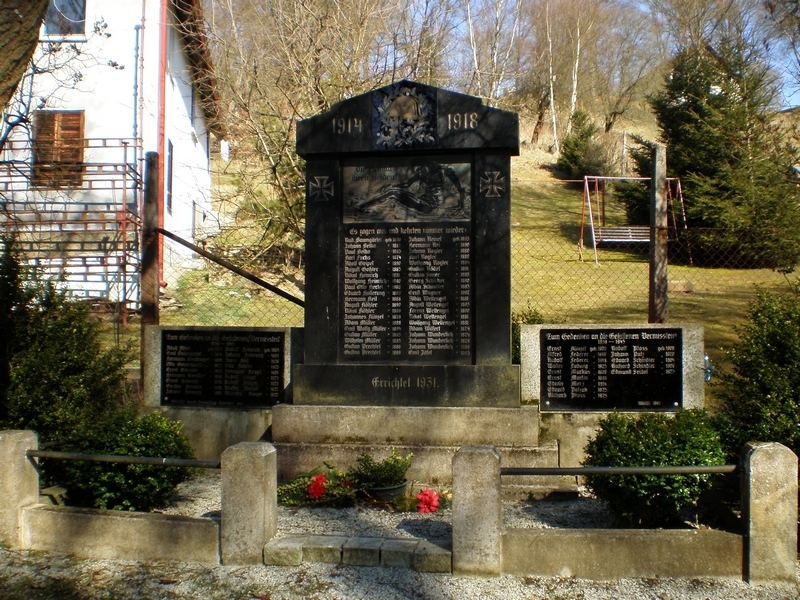
WW1 & WW2 memorial

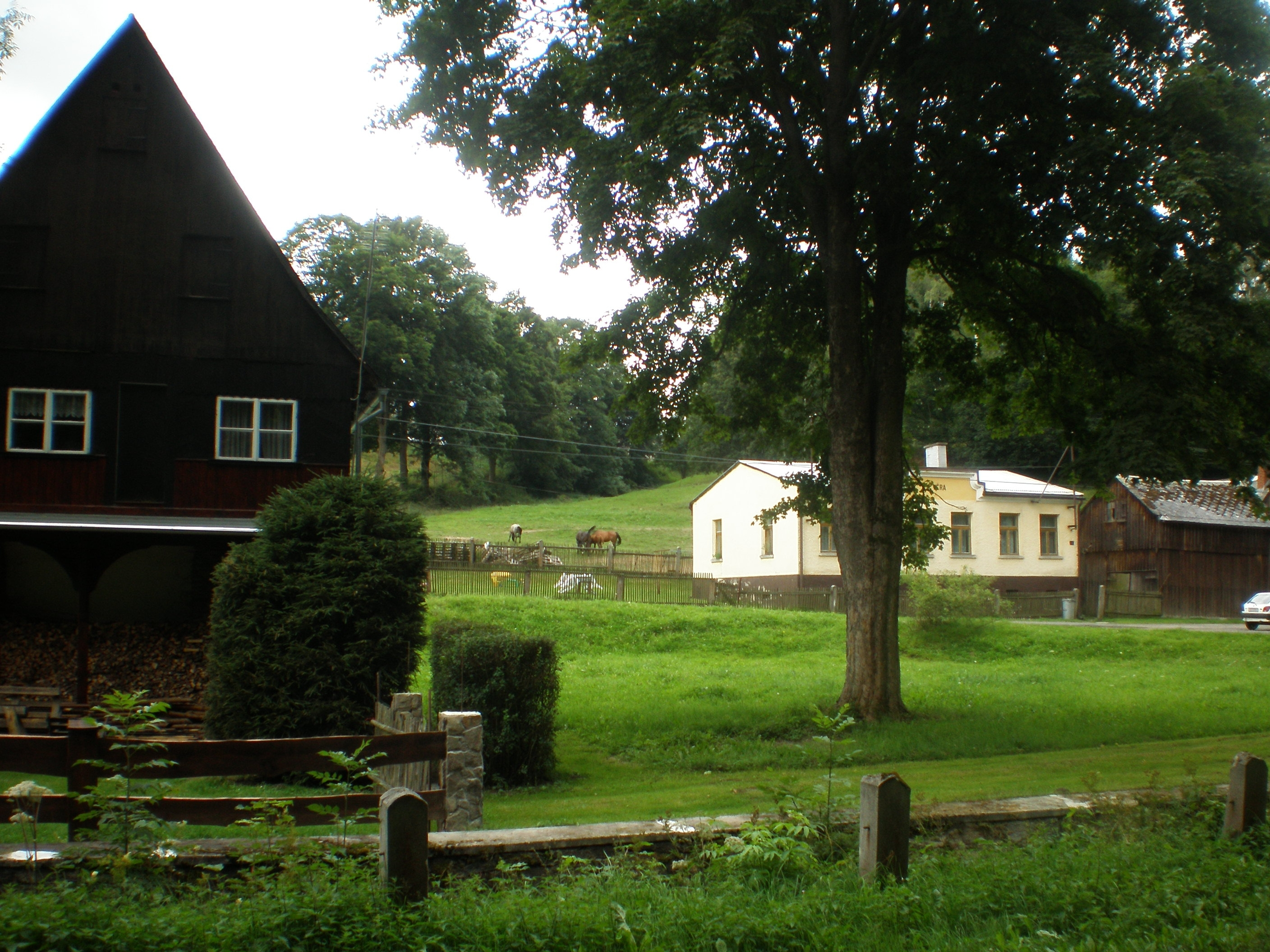
Houses
