= Eš =

- Municipality
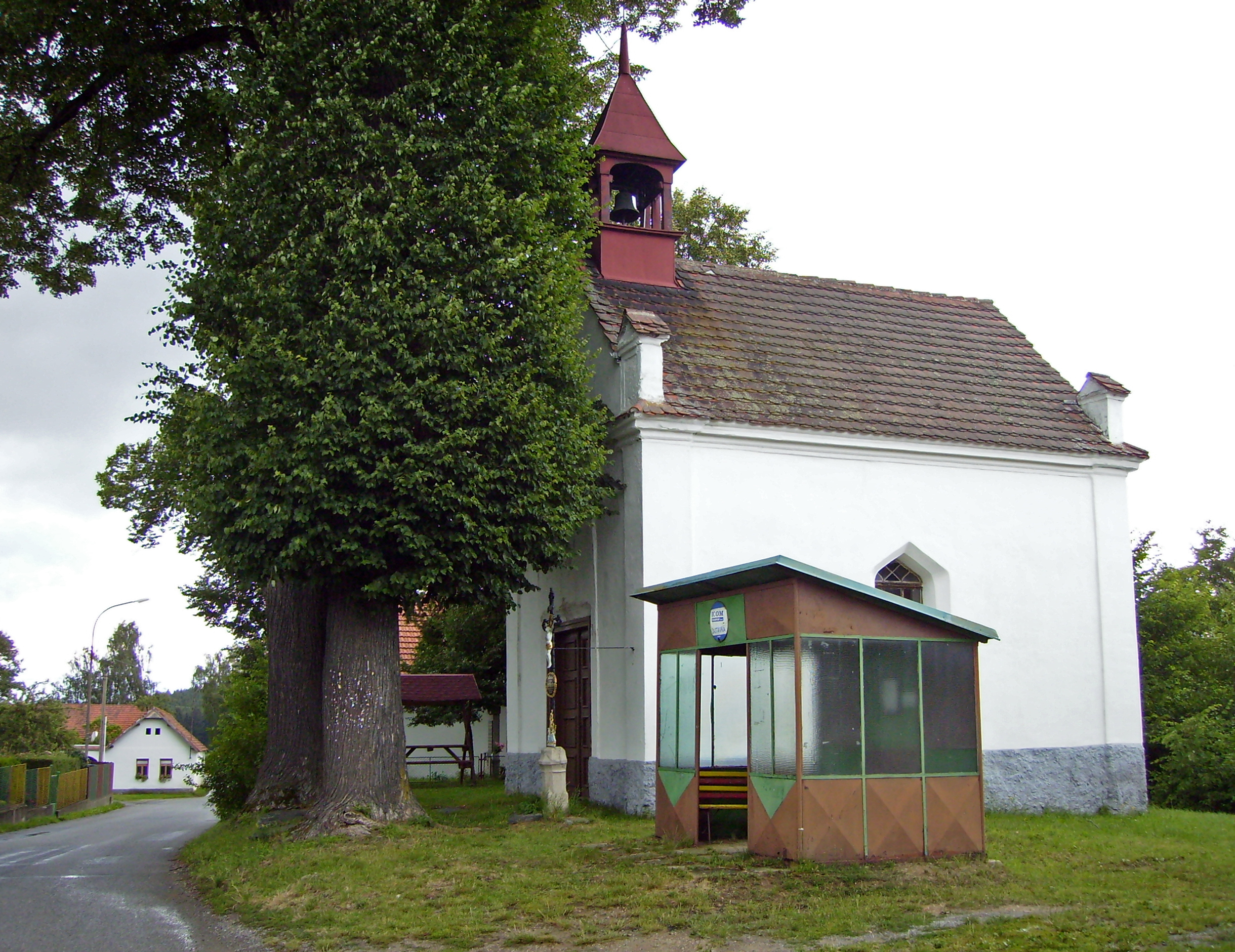
- Chapel of Saint Magdalene

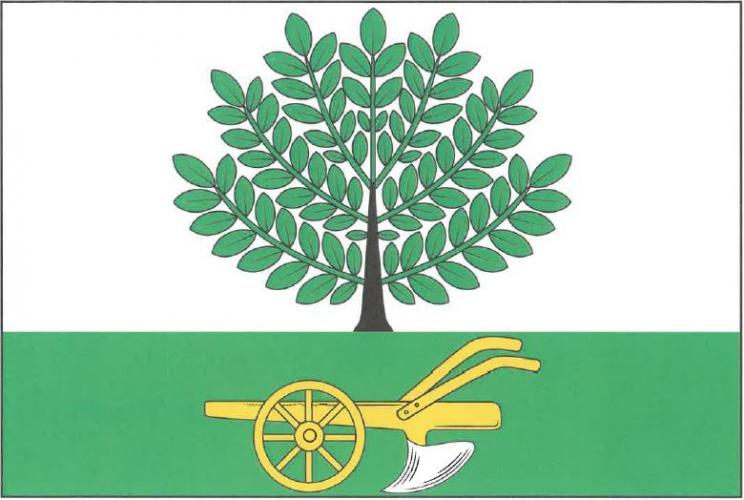
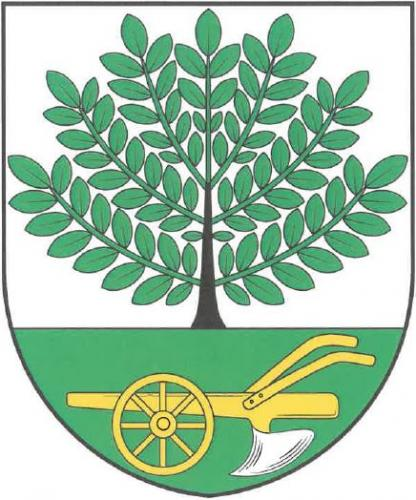
- Flag Coat of arms

- Location in the Czech Republic
- Coordinates: 49°26′5″N 15°0′5″E
- Country: Czech Republic
- Region: Vysočina
- District: Pelhřimov
- First mentioned: 1415

Area
  - Total: 4.07 km^{2} (1.57 sq mi)
- Elevation: 545 m (1,788 ft)

Population (2026-01-01)
  - Total: 62
  - Density: 15/km^{2} (39/sq mi)
- Time zone: UTC+1 (CET)
  - Summer (DST): UTC+2 (CEST)
- Postal code: 395 01
- Website: www.obeces.cz

Eš (German: Esche) is a municipality and village in Pelhřimov District in the Vysočina Region of the Czech Republic. It has about 60 inhabitants.

Eš lies approximately 16 kilometres (10 mi) west of Pelhřimov, 43 km (27 mi) west of Jihlava, and 83 km (52 mi) south-east of Prague.

== Demographics ==
Historical population
Year	Pop.	±%
1869	233	—
1880	251	+7.7%
1890	239	−4.8%
1900	232	−2.9%
1910	239	+3.0%
1921	199	−16.7%
1930	186	−6.5%
1950	134	−28.0%
1961	130	−3.0%
1970	104	−20.0%
1980	81	−22.1%
1991	55	−32.1%
2001	51	−7.3%
2011	55	+7.8%
2021	54	−1.8%
Source: Censuses
