= Gerhard Hahn (Germanist) =

German professor of medieval studies (born 1933)

Gerhard Hahn (born 1933, Aš, Czechoslovakia) is a German professor of medieval studies. He is professor emeritus of Medieval German Literature at the University of Regensburg. On a scholarship from Studienstiftung, Hahn studied at the Ludwig-Maximilians-Universität München in German, English, history, philosophy, and theology. In 1959, he passed the Staatsexamen from and took an Assistentur in 1961, and received his doctorate as summa cum laude. His doctoral thesis was about the poetry work Der Ackermann aus Böhmen. In 1972, he accepted a visiting professorship at the University of Salzburg. In 1973, he was appointed to the University of Regensburg, where he thenceforth until his retirement worked as a professor of Early German Literature until 1999. His research interests are the literature of the late Middle Ages and the early modern period, the literature of the Reformation (especially of Martin Luther), spiritual and ecclesiastical songs from the beginning to the present, minstrelsy, and epigrammatic poetry (especially Walther von der Vogelweide).
