= Nebesa, Aš =

Nebesa
- Municipal part of Aš
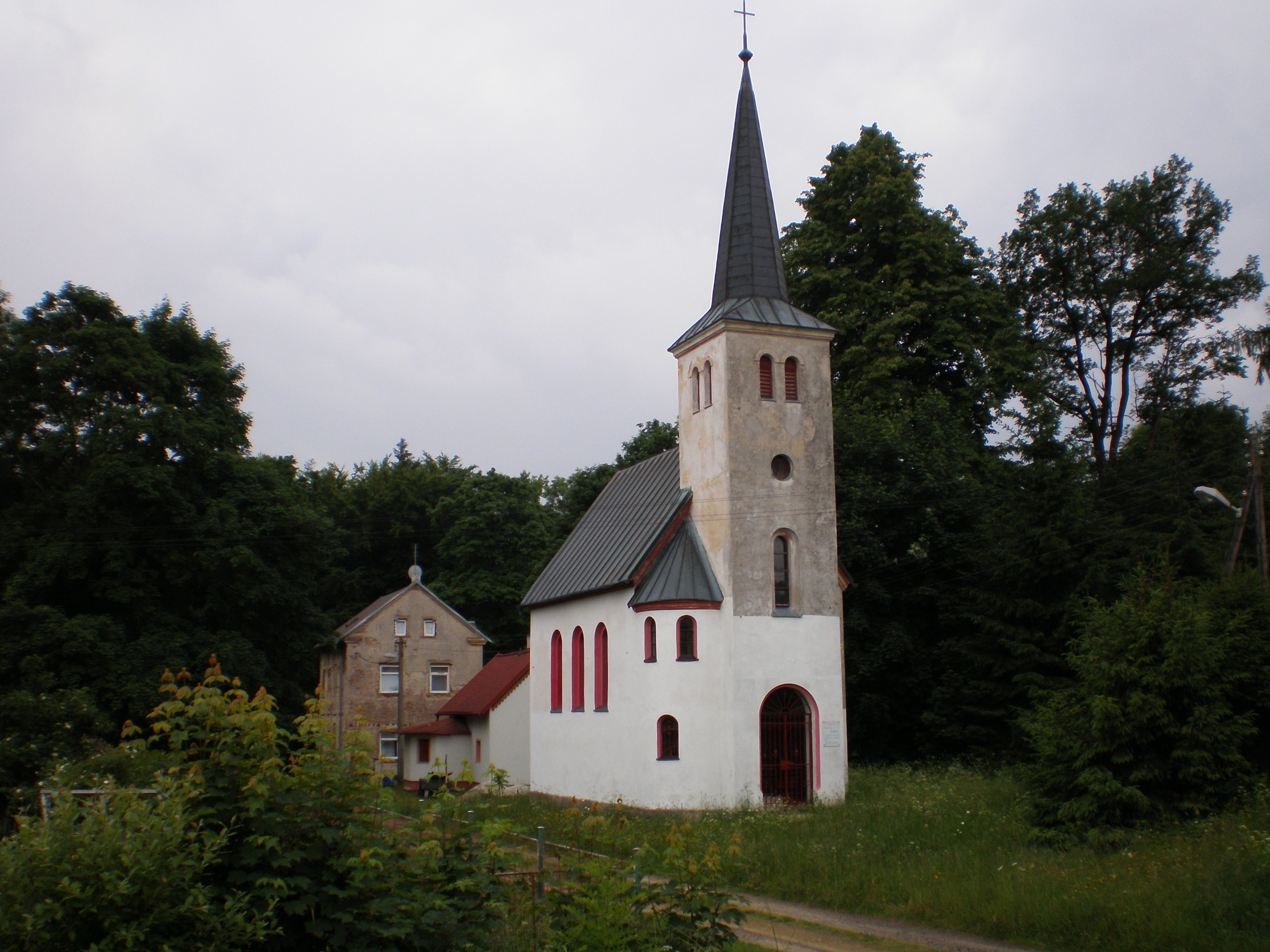
- Interactive map of Nebesa
- Coordinates: 50°11′50″N 12°13′43″E
- Country: Czech Republic
- Region: Karlovy Vary
- District: Cheb
- Municipality: Aš
- First mentioned: 1598

Area
  - Total: 5.84 km^{2} (2.25 sq mi)

Population (2021)
  - Total: 27
  - Density: 4.6/km^{2} (12/sq mi)
- Time zone: UTC+1 (CET)
  - Summer (DST): UTC+2 (CEST)
- Postal code: 352 01

Nebesa (German: Himmelreich, formerly Egrisch Reuth) is a village and municipal part of Aš in the Karlovy Vary Region of Czech Republic. It has about 30 inhabitants.

In the village there is a chapel of Virgin Mary, a restaurant and bus stop.

== Etymology ==
In Czech, Nebesa means heavens. The German name, Himmelreich, has a similar meaning: himmel means heaven and reich means empire.

== History ==
Nebesa is first mentioned in 1315. During the Seven Years' War an entrenchment was built here by Austrian marshal Macquir. On May 8, 1759 a battle was fought here between armies of Austrian marshal Macquir and Prussian general von Finck.

== Geography ==
Nebesa lies 3 kilometres southeast from Aš, on extensive area which is mostly covered by forests.

== Demographics ==
Historical population

Year	Pop.	±%
1869	122	—
1880	125	+2.5%
1890	107	−14.4%
1900	142	+32.7%
1910	138	−2.8%
1921	120	−13.0%
1930	152	+26.7%
1950	65	−57.2%

Year	Pop.	±%
1961	58	−10.8%
1970	30	−48.3%
1980	18	−40.0%
1991	19	+5.6%
2001	13	−31.6%
2011	36	+176.9%
2021	27	−25.0%

Source: Censuses

== Landmarks ==
- Catholic chapel of Virgin Mary from 1907
- iron crucifix from 1862.
