= Operation Crusader =

Allied attack against Axis, North Africa, WWII, 1941

- Part of the Western Desert campaign in the Mediterranean and Middle East theatre of World War II
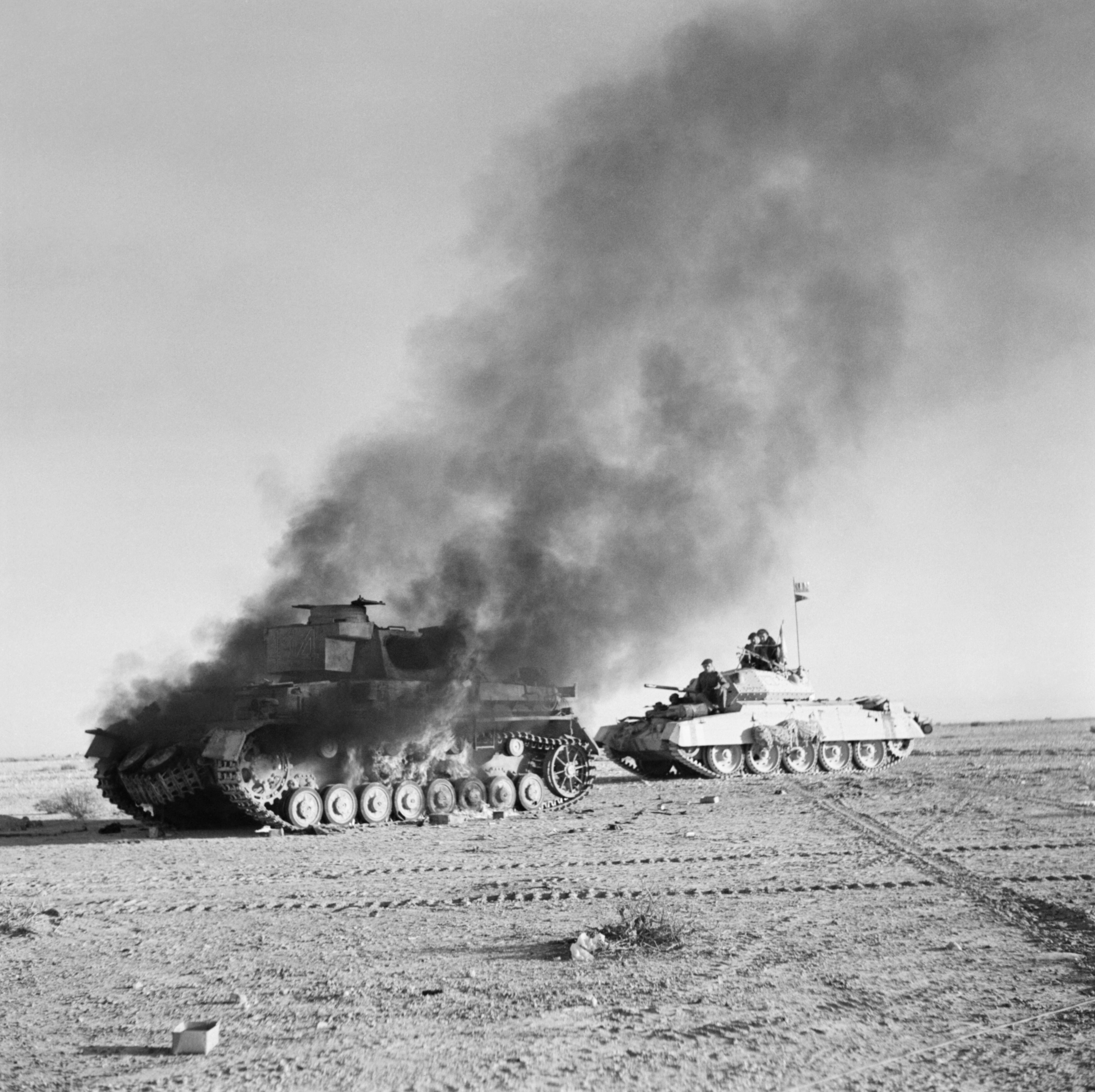
- A Mark I Crusader tank passes a burning German Panzer IV
Date	18 November – 30 December 1941
Location	Egypt and Libya 30°N 24°E
Result	Allied victory
Territorial changes	Cyrenaica recaptured by Allied forces

Belligerents
United Kingdom; India; New Zealand; South Africa; Australia; Poland; Czechoslovakia	Italy; Germany

Commanders and leaders
Claude Auchinleck; Alan Cunningham; Neil Ritchie; Willoughby Norrie; R. Godwin-Austen	Ettore Bastico; Erwin Rommel; Ludwig Crüwell; Gastone Gambara; Enea Navarini

Strength
118,000 men; 738 tanks (Note: XXX Corps: 477 tanks; XIII Corps: 135 tanks; Tobruk garrison: 126 tanks. 339 tanks were of various cruiser models with 210 being the latest A15 Crusader. Infantry tanks: 201. XIII Corps had 132, with roughly equal amounts of Matilda IIs and Valentine tanks. The Tobruk garrison had 69 Matilda IIs. XXX Corps had 173 M3 Stuarts and there were 25 Light Tank Mk VI with the Tobruk garrison.); 724 aircraft (616 serviceable) (Note: 650 aeroplanes (550 serviceable) in Egypt and 74 (66 serviceable) in Malta.)	119,000 men (Note: 65,000 German, 54,000 Italian); 414–552 tanks (Note: 70 Panzer II, 139 Panzer III, 35 Panzer IV, 146 Fiat M13/40, and 162 Italian light tanks. Bayerlein wrote of 260 German (15 Panzer I, 40 Panzer II, 150 Panzer III, 55 Panzer IV) and 154 Italian tanks.); 536 aircraft (342 serviceable) (Note: A potential Axis serviceable reserve of 750 aircraft in Tripolitania, Sicily, Sardinia, Greece and Crete, excluding transport aircraft, aircraft in mainland Italy or part of the Italian Navy.)

Casualties and losses
17,700; 2,900 killed; 7,300 wounded; 7,500 missing (Note: Casualties have been rounded by source due to flawed data but cover the serious fighting of November, December and the first half of January.); c. 320 tanks (Note: 278 write offs.); c. 300 aircraft	52,100; German: 14,600; 1,100 killed; 3,400 wounded; 10,100 missing; Italian: 23,700; 1,200 killed; 2,700 wounded; 19,800 missing; 13,800 captured; 340 tanks destroyed; German: 220; Italian: 120; c. 332 aircraft destroyed c. 228 abandoned

Operation Crusader (18 November – 30 December 1941) was a military operation of the Western Desert campaign during World War II by the British Eighth Army (with Commonwealth, Indian and Allied contingents) against the Axis forces (German and Italian) in North Africa commanded by Generalleutnant (Lieutenant-General) Erwin Rommel. The operation was intended to bypass Axis defences on the Egyptian–Libyan frontier, defeat the Axis armoured forces near Tobruk, raise the Siege of Tobruk and re-occupy Cyrenaica.

On 18 November 1941, the Eighth Army began a surprise attack. From 18 to 22 November, the dispersal of British armoured units led to them suffering 530 tank losses and inflicting Axis losses of about 100 tanks. On 23 November, the 5th South African Brigade was destroyed at Sidi Rezegh but caused many German tank losses. On 24 November Rommel ordered the "dash to the wire" and caused chaos in the British rear but allowed the British armoured forces to recover. On 27 November, the New Zealanders reached the Tobruk garrison and ended the siege.

Lack of supplies forced Rommel to shorten his lines of communication and on 7 December 1941, the Axis forces withdrew to the Gazala position and on 15 December began a withdrawal to El Agheila. The 2nd South African Division captured Bardia on 2 January 1942, Sollum on 12 January and the fortified Halfaya position on 17 January, taking about 13,800 prisoners. On 21 January 1942, the Panzerarmee Afrika surprised the Eighth Army and drove it back to Gazala where both sides regrouped. The Battle of Gazala began at the end of May 1942.

== Background ==
=== Intelligence ===
Nachrichten Fernaufklärungs Kompanie (FAK 621 [Signals Unit 621]) provided Rommel with tactical intelligence of high quality from August 1941 to January 1942. The German organisation benefited greatly from British incompetence in the use of tactical codes, R/T signalling in clear and an ineffective call-sign procedure from brigade to battalion at the front. FAK 621 read much of the War Office high-grade hand cypher, which the wireless traffic from the Eighth Army HQ down to divisional HQs used. Until January, when the British improved their recyphering, the Germans obtained as much information on the British order of battle as the Government Code and Cypher School (GC & CS) Ultra decrypts revealed of the Axis equivalents. In October 1941, British Army Enigma decrypts had contained German data about increased British tank strengths. The German information was so accurate that the War Office became seriously worried about signals security but only in July 1942, when the British captured FAK 621, did they learn the extent of German eavesdropping.

=== Axis supply ===
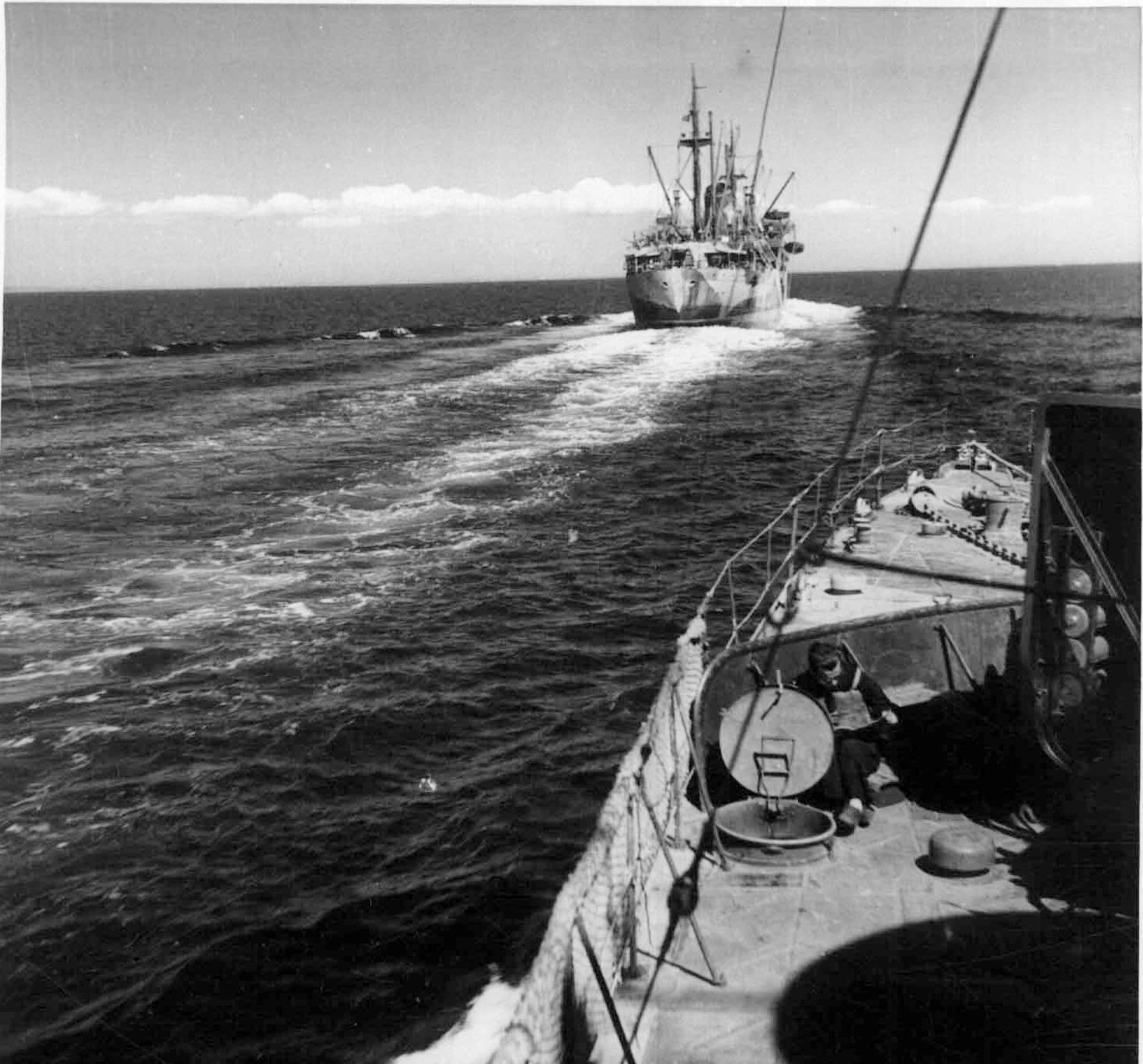
Italian convoy en route to Italian Libya, 1941

A German motorised division needed 350 long tons (360 t) per day, and moving the supplies 300 mi (480 km) took 1,170 2 long tons (2.0 t) lorries. With seven Axis divisions, as well as air and naval units, 70,000 long tons (71,000 t) of supplies per month were needed. The Vichy French agreed to let the Germans use the port city of Bizerta, but no supplies reached the port until late 1942. From February to May 1941, a surplus of 45,000 long tons (46,000 t) was delivered. Attacks from Malta had some effect but in May, the worst month for ship losses, 91 per cent of supplies arrived. Lack of transport in Libya left German supplies in Tripoli and the Italians had only 7,000 lorries to transport supplies to 225,000 men. A record amount of supplies arrived in June but at the front, shortages worsened.

There were fewer Axis attacks on Malta from June and the British increased the proportion of ships sunk from 19 per cent in July to 25 per cent in September, when Benghazi was bombed and ships diverted to Tripoli, air supply in October making little difference. Deliveries averaged 72,000 long tons (73,000 t) per month from July to October but the consumption of 30 to 50 per cent of fuel deliveries by road transport and 35 per cent of supply lorries being unserviceable, reduced deliveries to the front. In November, during Operation Crusader, a five-ship convoy was sunk and air attacks on road convoys prevented daylight journeys. Lack of deliveries and the Eighth Army offensive forced a retreat to El Agheila from 4 December, crowding the Via Balbia, where British ambushes destroyed about half of the remaining Axis transport.

Convoys to Tripoli resumed and ship losses increased but by 16 December, the supply situation had eased except for the fuel shortage. In December, the Luftwaffe was restricted to one sortie per day. The Vichy French sold 3,600 long tons (3,700 t) of fuel, U-boats were ordered into the Mediterranean and air reinforcements sent from the Soviet Union in December. The Regia Marina used warships to carry fuel to Derna and Benghazi and made a maximum effort from 16 to 17 December. Four battleships, three light cruisers and 20 destroyers escorted four ships to Libya. The use of an armada for 20,000 long tons (20,000 t) of cargo ships depleted the navy's fuel reserve and allowed only one more battleship convoy. Bizerta, Tunisia, was canvassed as an entrepôt, but it was in range of RAF aircraft from Malta and was another 500 mi (800 km) west of Tripoli.

=== Siege of Tobruk ===
The great importance of Tobruk as an entrepôt for supplies and the denial of it to an opponent led to Oberkommando der Wehrmacht (OKW) and Comando Supremo making frequent demands for its capture and Winston Churchill and the British War Cabinet demanding that General Archibald Wavell prevent its loss. The garrison, mainly the 9th Australian Division, had defeated an Axis attack in May 1941 and the siege had settled into an active defence by the Australians, who patrolled most nights, reconnoitring, attacking and ambushing, gaining mastery over no man's land. Larger sorties needed reinforcements from Egypt which were not available but the 20th Australian Infantry Brigade improved the Australian position at the Ras el Medauar salient and the 24th Australian Infantry Brigade made an abortive attack on the shoulders of the salient, the garrison then returning to active defence.

=== Eighth Army plan ===
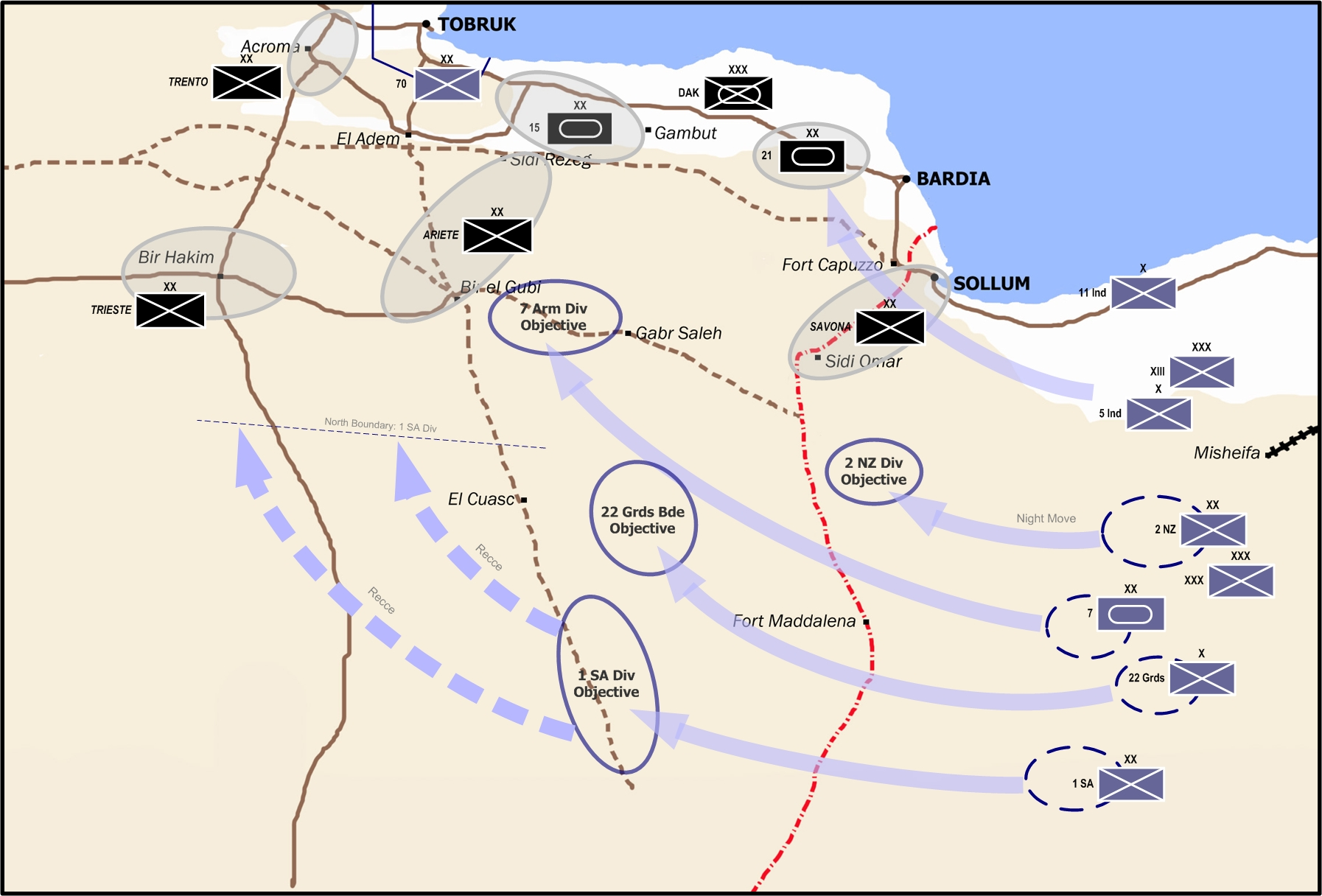
British plan for Operation Crusader

The Afrika Korps was to be defeated by the 7th Armoured Division as the South African Division covered its left flank. XIII Corps and the 4th Armoured Brigade (detached from the 7th Armoured Division), would make a clockwise flanking advance west of Sidi Omar. After the destruction of the Axis armour by the 7th Armoured Division, to threaten the rear of the Axis defences eastwards from Sidi Omar, to the coast at Halfaya, XIII Corps was to advance north to Bardia.

XXX Corps was to continue north-west to Tobruk to meet a breakout by the 70th Infantry Division. There was also a deception plan to persuade the Axis that the main Allied attack would not be ready until early December and be a sweeping outflanking move through Jarabub, an oasis on the edge of the Great Sand Sea, more than 150 mi (240 km) to the south of the real point of attack. That proved so successful that Rommel, refusing to believe that an attack was imminent, was not in Africa when it came.

== Battle ==
=== First phase ===
==== 18 November ====
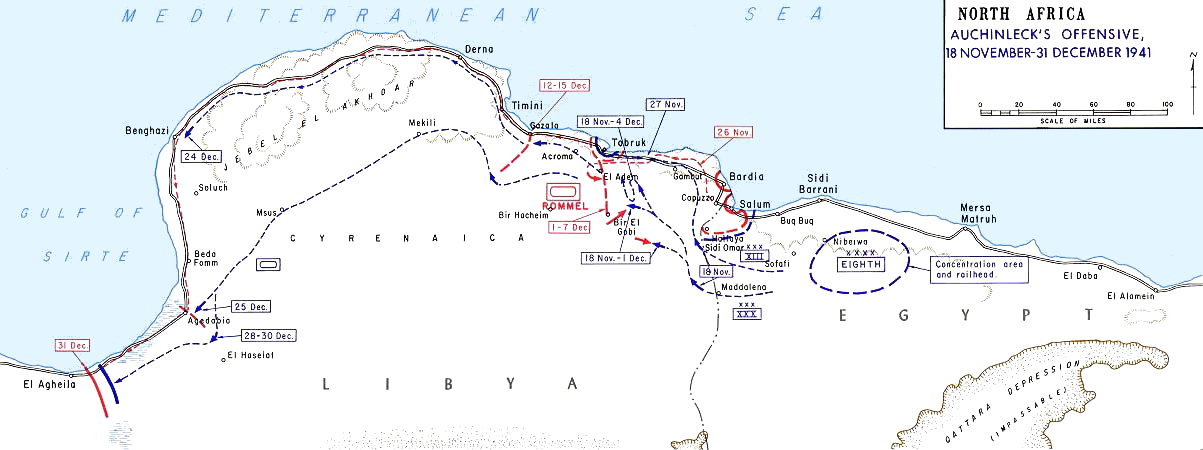
Map showing the area of Operation Crusader, November to December 1941

Before dawn on 18 November, the Eighth Army advanced westwards from Mersa Matruh, crossed the Libyan border near Fort Maddalena, about 50 mi (80 km) south of Sidi Omar and turned to the north-west. Storms on the night before the offensive grounded the aircraft of both sides. The 7th Armoured Brigade of the 7th Armoured Division advanced north-west towards Tobruk with the 22nd Armoured Brigade to the west. XIII Corps, with the 2nd New Zealand Division, advanced with the 4th Armoured Brigade on its left and the 7th Indian Infantry Brigade, 4th Indian Division on its right at Sidi Omar.

==== First actions: Bir el Gubi, Sidi Rezegh, Gabr Saleh ====
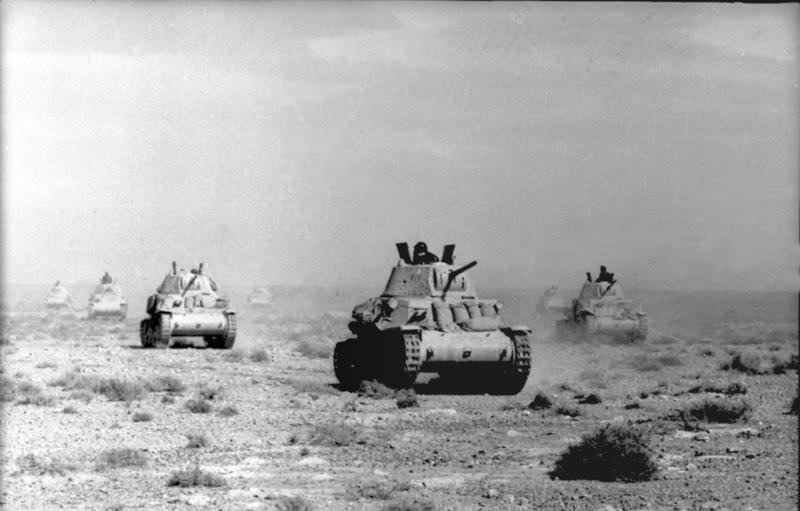
Italian tanks of the Ariete Division during the battle.

On 19 November, 7th Armoured Division was spread out to the south of Tobruk. To the west, the 22nd Armoured Brigade met the Ariete Division at Bir el Gubi: After a sharp action they were forced to withdraw after 25 of its new Crusader tanks were knocked out for an Italian loss of 34 tanks. In the centre the 7th Armoured Brigade and the Support Group advanced to the airfield at Sidi Rezegh, capturing 19 aircraft and menacing the rear of Division z.b.V. Afrika. After the failure of a counter-attack by Division z.b.V. Afrika and the "Bologna" Division the 7th Armoured Division dug in facing south. To the east a battlegroup of the 21st Panzer Division moved to Gabr Saleh and knocked out 23 Stuart tanks of the 4th Armoured Brigade, for a loss of three by nightfall. By attaching the 4th Armoured Brigade to XIII Corps, and letting the 22nd Armoured Brigade to be bogged down against the "Ariete" Division while the 7th Armoured Brigade advanced unsupported towards Tobruk, Cunningham had allowed the British tanks to become dispersed before they met the main Axis armoured force.

On 20 November, the 15th Panzer Division was ordered to Sidi Aziz and thence towards Capuzzo, the 21st Panzer Division was to move north of the Trigh el Abd on Sidi Omar. Nothing but British reconnaissance units was found and then the 21st Panzer Division was stranded, short of fuel and ammunition. Crüwell found that British tanks were moving west along the Trigh el Abd. During the afternoon, the 15th Panzer Division attacked the 4th Armoured Brigade near Gabr Saleh and inflicted another ten tank casualties, reducing it to less than two-thirds its establishment of 164 tanks and forcing the brigade into another retirement. The 22nd Armoured Brigade had been ordered to disengage from the "Ariete" Division and to move east in support of the 4th Armoured Brigade. The 1st South African Division was to take over against the "Ariete" Division and the 4th Armoured Brigade was released from its role as flank guard for XIII Corps. The 22nd Armoured Brigade arrived too late to support the 4th Armoured Brigade. During the night of 20/21 November, Rommel ordered the German tanks north-west for an attack on Sidi Rezegh.

==== Tobruk ====
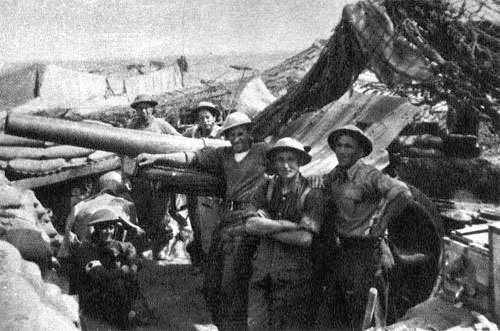
Czechoslovak 11th Infantry Battalion defending Tobruk

The 70th Infantry Division was to break out from Tobruk on 21 November and cut off the Germans to the south-east. The night before, the garrison gapped the wire, planted and marked minefields and put four bridges over the anti-tank ditch. On the evening of 20 November the 14th Infantry Brigade (2nd Battalion Black Watch, 2nd Queen's), the 16th Infantry Brigade (2nd King's Own) the 32nd Army Tank Brigade (1/4th RTR, 7th RTR), the 1st, 104th and 107th regiments RHA and 144th Field Regiment RA, with detachments of the 2nd and 54th Field Companies RE and several armoured cars (to lift mines each carrying a sapper) moved up.

The Polish Carpathian Brigade was to mount a diversion just before dawn against the "Pavia" Division. The "Bologna", "Brescia" and "Pavia" divisions on the Tobruk perimeter were to receive 40,000 rounds from 100 guns. The 7th Armoured Brigade and the 7th Support Group was to advance from Sidi Rezegh and capture part of the ridge above the Trigh Capuzzo, then the 6th RTR was to advance and join the breakthrough force at El Duda. The 7th Support Group consisted of 1st Battalion, King's Royal Rifle Corps (1st KRRC), 2nd Battalion, The Rifle Brigade, 3rd Field Regiment RA (anti-tank), 60th Field Regiment RA and a battery of the 51st Field Regiment RA.

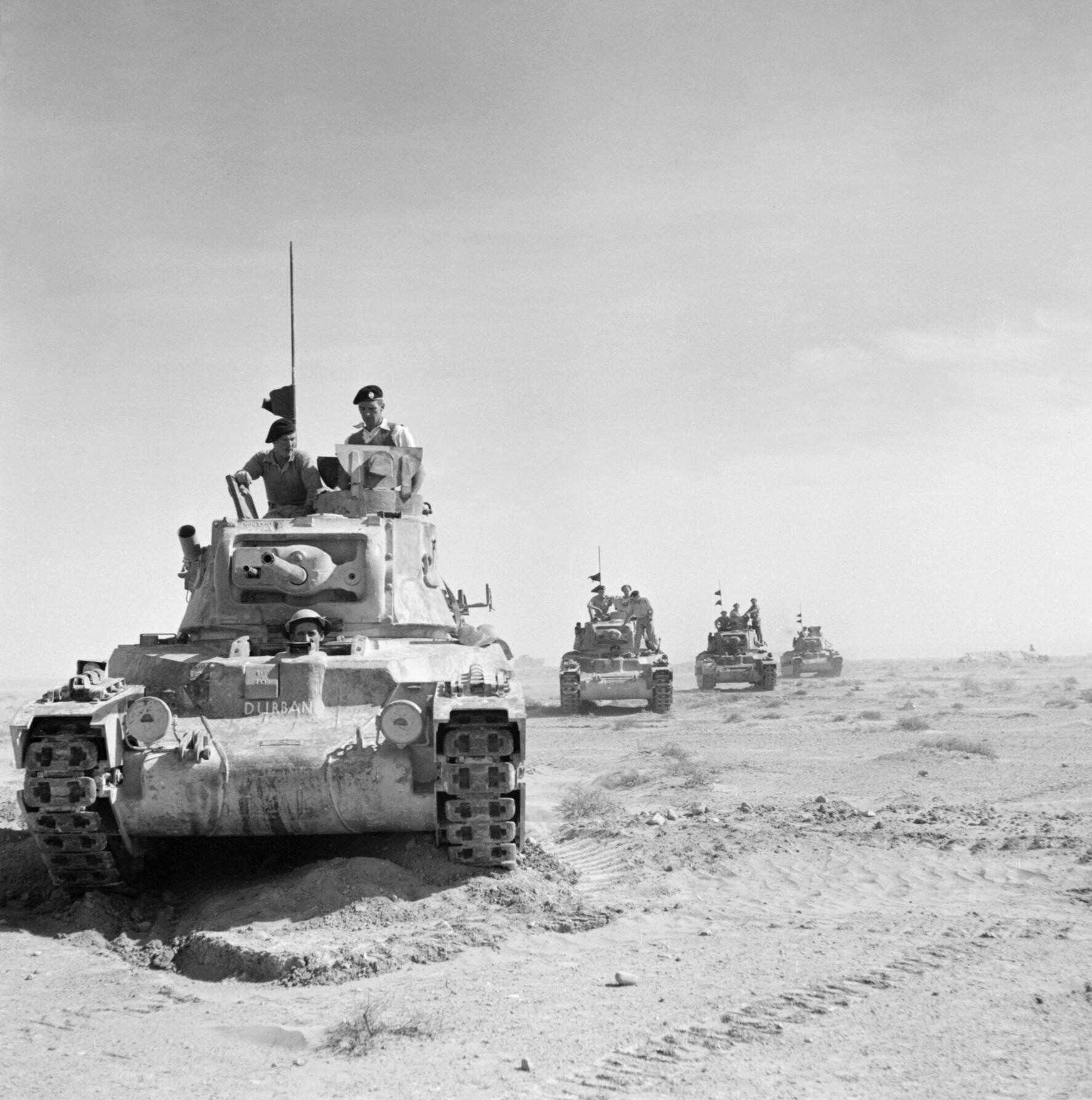
Matilda tanks on the move outside Tobruk, 18 November 1941

The Tobruk breakout force attacked with the 2nd King's Own on the right flank, the 2nd Black Watch in the centre and another battalion on the left flank, to capture strongpoints leading to Ed Duda. (Note: "Although the attack was only supposed to be a feint, the Polish Brigade (1 Pulk Artylerii), attacked as if it was the main thrust.... The Poles slaughtered the Italians defending the sector. It was the Poles' first taste of victory on a large scale since the war had begun almost two years earlier".) The Italians were stunned by the massive fire and a company of the "Pavia" Division was overrun in the dark but the "Bologna" Division recovered. By mid-afternoon, the break-out force had advanced some 3.5 mi (5.6 km) toward Ed Duda on the main supply road when they paused, as it became clear that the 7th Armoured Division would not meet them.

The central attack by the Black Watch involved a charge under massed machine-gun fire against strongpoints until it reached strongpoint Tiger. The Black Watch lost an estimated 200 men and its commanding officer. (Note: The Official History of New Zealand in the Second World War 1939–45 noted, "The superlative élan of the Black Watch in the attack had been equalled by the remarkable persistence of the defence in the face of formidable tank-and-infantry pressure".) The British pressed on but the attack petered out since the infantry could not capture the "Bologna" Division defences around the Tugun strongpoint. (Note: Tugun was attacked at 3:00 p.m. and perhaps half the position was captured, with 256 Italians and many light field guns captured but the Italians in the western half could not be dislodged; the base of the break-out area remained too narrow.)

On 21 November, there was a costly action by parts of the German 155th Rifle Regiment, Artillery Group Bottcher, Panzer Regiment 5 and the 4th, 7th and 22nd Armoured Brigades for possession of Sidi Rezegh and the high ground held by the "Bologna" Division. On 22 November, Scobie ordered the position to be consolidated and the corridor widened in the hope that the Eighth Army would link up. The 2nd York and Lancaster Regiment with tank support took strongpoint Tiger and left a 7,000 yd (4.0 mi; 6.4 km) gap between the corridor and Ed Duda but attacks on the Tugun and Dalby Square strongpoints failed. The defenders of strongpoint Tugun reduced the strength in one attacking British company to 33 all ranks.

=== Second phase ===
==== Sidi Rezegh ====
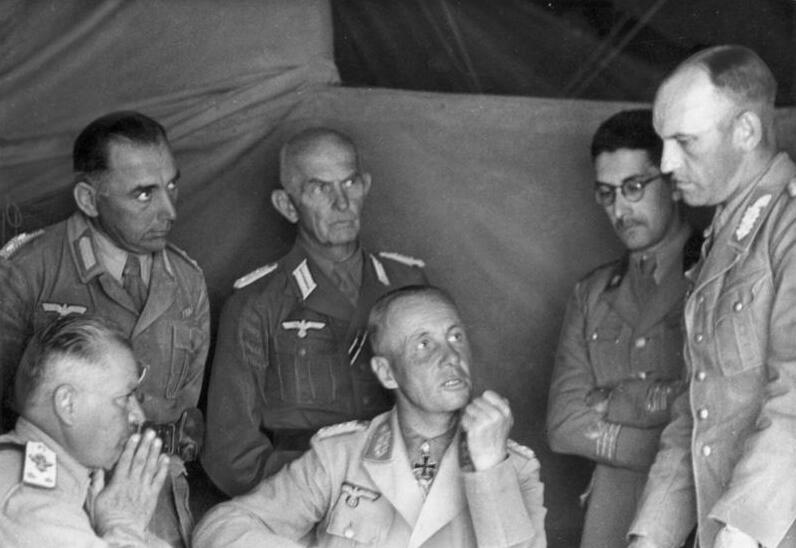
Rommel consulting with Colonel Diesener and General Navarini at the start of Operation Crusader

On 23 November, the 70th Infantry Division in Tobruk attacked the 25th "Bologna" Infantry Division to reach Sidi Rezegh. Parts of the "Pavia" Division arrived and contained the attack. (On 26 November, the British attacked Ed Duda ridge and early on 27 November linked up with a small force of New Zealanders.). The 7th Armoured Division had planned its attack northwards to Tobruk to start at 8:30 a.m. on 21 November but at 7:45 a.m., patrols reported tanks to the south-east. The 7th Hussars and 2nd RTR faced the tanks and four infantry companies with the guns of the Support Group attacked to the north, expecting reinforcements from the 5th South African Infantry Brigade. The South Africans had been detached from the 1st South African Division at Bir el Gubi, which faced the "Ariete" Division and was en route.

The Support Group attack failed and by nightfall the 7th Armoured Brigade had been joined by the Support Group and the remnants of the 6th RTR to hold on, the tanks down to 28 runners. The South African brigade was dug in south-east of Bir el Haiad but the panzers were between them and Sidi Rezegh. By dusk on 21 November, the 4th Armoured Brigade was 8 mi (13 km) south-east of Sidi Rezegh and the 22nd Armoured Brigade was in contact with German tanks at Bir el Haiad, 12 mi (19 km) south-west of Sidi Rezegh. From the north, the 70th Infantry Division was opposed by German and Italian troops facing north and west. Another Axis force faced south. Part of the 7th Support Group was north of the airfield at Sidi Rezegh and the rest with the 7th Armoured Brigade faced south against most of the DAK advancing north, which was being pursued by the 4th and 22nd Armoured brigades from the south. Rommel divided his forces again, the 21st Panzer Division went on the defensive with the "Afrika" Division between Sidi Rezegh and Tobruk, while the 15th Panzer Division moved 15 mi (24 km) east to Gambut, ready for a battle of manoeuvre, which General Ludwig Crüwell believed would favour the Afrika Korps; the 21st Panzer Division was ordered to Belhamed.

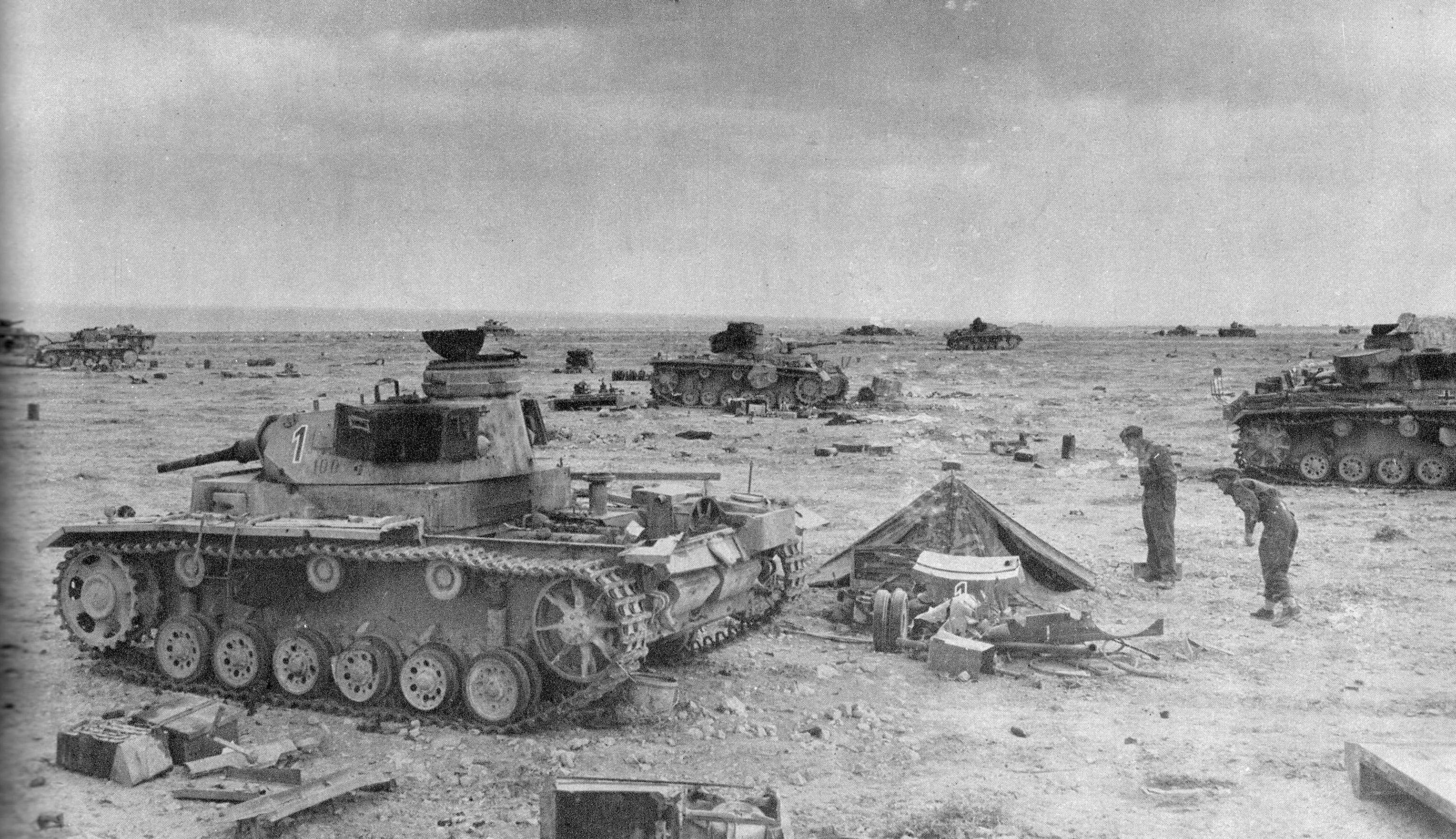
The aftermath of the Sidi Rezegh battle, with several knocked-out Panzer IIIs

On 22 November, with the 7th Armoured Division down to 209 tanks, Norrie decided to wait. In the early afternoon, the 21st Panzer Division attacked Sidi Rezegh and captured the airfield. Despite having fewer tanks, German all-arms tactics knocked out fifty tanks (mainly from the 22nd Armoured Brigade) and pushed the 7th Armoured Division back. The fighting at Sidi Rezegh continued until 22 November, with the 5th South African Brigade fighting to the south of the airfield attacking northwards, which was a failure. The 7th Armoured Brigade withdrew, with only four of its 150 tanks remaining operational. In four days, the Eighth Army had lost 530 tanks against about 100 Axis losses. (Note: The most memorable action during the North African Campaign of the 3rd Field Regiment, Transvaal Horse Artillery, was during the Battle of Sidi Rezegh. On 23 November 1941 it was surrounded by German armour and artillery and subjected to a continuous barrage. They tried to take cover in shallow slit trenches but in many places, the South Africans could dig in only around 9 in (230 mm) because of the solid limestone under their positions. The Transvaal Horse Artillery engaged tanks from the 15th Panzer Division and the 21st Panzer Division, the gunners firing over open sights as they were overrun. Many of the gun crews were captured and as darkness fell, those who could escape made their way to Allied lines.} The gunners managed to save five of their 24 guns and later recovered seven other guns. After the Battle of Sidi Rezegh, Norrie stated that the South African "sacrifice resulted in the turning point of the battle, giving the Allies the upper hand in North Africa at that time".)

==== Frontier ====
On 22 November on the frontier, XIII Corps sent the 5th New Zealand Infantry Brigade north-east to capture Fort Capuzzo on the main Sollum–Bardia road. The brigade attacked Bir Ghirba, south of Fort Capuzzo, the headquarters of the Savona Division but was repulsed. To the south, two battalions of, the 42nd RTR and part of the 44th RTR captured Sidi Omar and most of the Libyan Omar strongpoints, the westernmost fortifications of the Axis border defences, for the loss of 37 tanks, most of them Matildas, to mines and anti-tank guns. The tank losses caused a delay in attacks on the other strong points until replacements had arrived. On 23 November, the 5th New Zealand Infantry Brigade continued its advance south-east, down the main road from Fort Capuzzo towards Sollum and cut off of the Axis positions from Sidi Omar to Sollum and Halfaya from Bardia and its supply route. Cunningham decided that the main action at Tobruk needed more infantry and ordered XIII Corps to send the 2nd New Zealand Division west, leaving a skeleton force to contain the Axis positions at Bardia and Capuzzo; XXX Corps was to continue to attack the Axis tank forces and support the New Zealand Division if it encountered tanks.

Neither the Eighth Army HQ nor the 7th Armoured Division HQ knew the real condition of its tank units until 23 November; the severely depleted 7th Armoured Brigade was ordered to maintain its hold on Sidi Rezegh. The 7th Indian Infantry Brigade was to continue its attack on Libyan Omar and the 5th New Zealand Infantry Brigade was to take Sollum barracks; the rest of the 2nd New Zealand Division was to head west for Tobruk. The 4th New Zealand Infantry Brigade took Gambut and the 6th New Zealand Infantry Brigade Group on the left flank at Bir el Hariga, moved north-west along the Trigh Capuzzo (Capuzzo–El Adem). The brigade arrived at Bir el Chleta, about 15 mi (24 km) east of Sidi Rezegh at first light on 23 November. The new Zealanders stumbled on the Afrika Korps HQ and captured most of its staff (Crüwell was absent) and no supplies reached either panzer division that day. Later that day, the 4th New Zealand Infantry Brigade Group was sent north of the 6th New Zealand Infantry Brigade to apply pressure on Tobruk and the 5th New Zealand Infantry Brigade covered Bardia and the Sollum–Halfaya positions.

==== Totensonntag ====
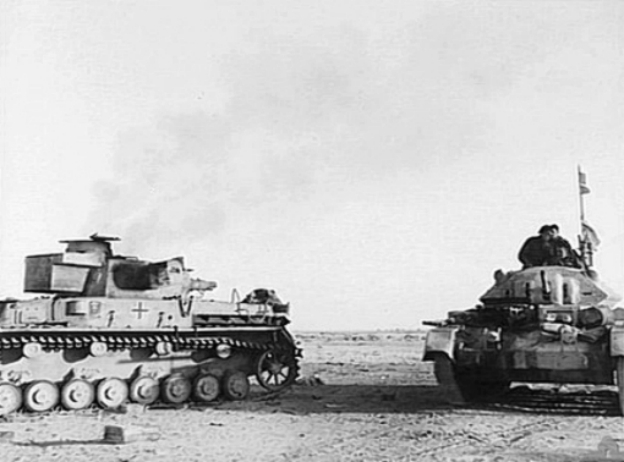
A British Crusader tank passes an abandoned German Panzer IV Ausf.A, 24 November 1941

On 23 November, Totensonntag (Sunday of the Dead to the Germans) the 15th Panzer Division moved southwards and ran into the positions of the 7th Support Group which faced north-west and was equally surprised. The Panzers turned west and encountered the 5th South African Brigade near Sidi Rezegh. Neumann-Silkow wanted to exploit the situation but Crüwell pressed on southwards towards the "Ariete" Division and ran into the 1st South African Brigade, which was moving to reinforce the 5th South African Brigade, which veered away to escape the German tanks. At 3:00 p.m. the 15th Panzer Division attacked the 5th South African Brigade but the South Africans had dug in to an area 4.3 mi × 6.2 mi (7 km × 10 km) with 100 guns and many anti-tank guns. Panzer Regiment 5 had caught up with its division and attacked on the right flank with the Panzer Regiment 8 in the centre. The "Ariete" Division was to attack on the left with troop carrying vehicles following the tanks.

The infantry of the 21st Panzer Division joined the attack after an hour, advancing from the north. The "Ariete" Division attack was prevented when it was attacked from a flank by the 22nd Armoured Brigade and Panzer Regiment 5 diverted to the north-east to face New Zealand units which had just arrived. The Axis attack overran the 5th South African Brigade and the 22nd Armoured Brigade lost about eleven of its 43 remaining tanks; the Afrika Korps suffered the loss of 72 of its 162 tanks. Many officers and NCOs became casualties. The tactical victory was too costly for the Germans; not exploiting surprise to unite with the Italians was costly, the tank losses were irreplaceable and had a serious effect on operations. Comando Supremo in Rome agreed to put the XX Mobile Corps, including the Ariete Armoured Division and the Trieste Motorised Division, under Rommel's command.

Further afield, during the morning the 6th New Zealand Infantry Brigade captured much of the Afrika Korps staff and most of its wireless units on the Trigh Capuzzo. The New Zealanders continued their advance and took the ridge at Point 175, after defeating Afrika Regiment 361. The 4th New Zealand Infantry Brigade took Gambut, the 5th New Zealand Infantry Brigade captured Upper Sollum and the 7th Indian Infantry Brigade captured Italian positions near Sidi Omar. Cunningham was alarmed at the extent of British tank losses, XXX Corps reporting that it was down to 44 tanks against 120 serviceable Axis tanks. On the morning of 23 November, before the destruction of the 5th South African Infantry Brigade, Cunningham asked Auchinleck to meet him at the Eighth Army HQ to decide whether to continue Crusader. Arriving that evening Auchinleck bluntly insisted that Cunningham continue the operation regardless of loss.

==== Dash to the wire ====
Later on 23 November Rommel decided to finish off the 7th Armoured Division and advance towards Sidi Omar to relieve the frontier garrisons. In the morning of 24 November, Rommel took command of the Afrika Korps and the "Ariete" Division to destroy the remnants of the British force and block the routes of retreat to Egypt and return by the evening or the next morning at the latest. (Note: In 2015, Bernd Stegemann wrote that a 24-hour diversion to the frontier would not deprive the Eighth Army of its supplies or prevent its retreat. He thought that Rommel wanted the dash to unsettle the British with a threat to their flanks, which had succeeded at El Agheila and Sidi Suleiman.) The German and Italian tanks scattered the many rear echelon support units in their path, split XXX Corps and almost cut off XIII Corps. On 25 November, the 15th Panzer Division set off north-east for Sidi Azeiz, found the area empty and was constantly attacked by the Desert Air Force. South of the border, Panzer Regiment 5, 21st Panzer Division, attacked the 7th Indian Brigade at Sidi Omar but was repulsed by the 1st Field Regiment RA firing over open sights. A second attack left Panzer Regiment 5 with few operational tanks. The rest of 21st Panzer Division had headed north-east, south of the border, to Halfaya.

By the evening of 25 November, the 15th Panzer Division was west of Sidi Azeiz (the 5th New Zealand Brigade headquarters) and down to 53 tanks, almost the remaining tank strength of the Afrika Korps. The Axis column had only a tenuous link to its supply dumps on the coast between Bardia and Tobruk and supply convoys had to find a way past the 4th New Zealand Infantry Brigade Group and the 6th New Zealand Infantry Brigade Group. On 26 November, the 15th Panzer Division bypassed Sidi Azeiz, headed for Bardia for supplies and arrived around mid-day. The remains of the 21st Panzer Division attacked north-west of Halfaya towards Capuzzo and Bardia. Ariete, approaching Bir Ghirba (15 mi (24 km) north-east of Sidi Omar, from the west, was ordered towards Fort Capuzzo to clear any opposition and link with the 21st Panzer Division. They were to be supported by the depleted Infantry Regiment 115 of the 15th Panzer Division, which was to advance with some artillery, south-east from Bardia toward Fort Capuzzo.

The two battalions of the 5th New Zealand Infantry Brigade, between Fort Capuzzo and Sollum Barracks, were engaged by the converging elements of the 15th Panzer Division and the 21st Panzer Division at dusk on 26 November. During the night, Infantry Regiment 115 got to within 800 yd (730 m) of Capuzzo. In the early hours of 27 November, Rommel met with the commanders of the panzer divisions at Bardia. The Afrika Korps had to return to the Tobruk front, where the 70th Infantry Division and the 2nd New Zealand Division had gained the initiative. On 25 November, in the Trento Division sector, the 2nd Battalion Queens Royal Regiment attacked the Bondi strongpoint but was repulsed. The garrison of Tugun, down to half their strength and exhausted and low on ammunition, food and water, surrendered on the evening of 25 November after it had defeated a British attack the previous night.

While Gruppe Böttcher contained the British tank attacks in the Bologna sector, a battalion of Bersaglieri from the "Trieste" Division counter-attacked the British breakout from Tobruk. Afterwards Oberstleutnant Fritz Bayerlein wrote,

On 25 November heavy fighting flared up again at Tobruk, where our holding force was caught between pincers, one coming from the south-east and the other from the fortress itself. By mustering all their strength, the Boettcher Group succeeded in beating off most of these attacks, and the only enemy penetration was brought to a standstill by an Italian counterattack.

Rommel ordered the 21st Panzer Division back to Tobruk, and the 15th Panzer Division was to attack forces that were thought to besiege the border positions between Fort Capuzzo and Sidi Omar. The 15th Panzer Division first had to capture Sidi Azeiz to make room. Neumann-Silkow felt the plan to have little chance of success and resolved to advance to Sidi Azeiz, where he believed there was a British supply dump, before he headed to Tobruk.

Defending the 5th New Zealand Infantry Brigade Headquarters at Sidi Azeiz were a company of the 22nd New Zealand Infantry Battalion and the armoured cars of the New Zealand Divisional Cavalry Regiment, with some field artillery, anti-tank, anti-aircraft and machine-gun units. The New Zealanders were overrun early on 27 November and 700 prisoners were taken but the armoured cars escaped. Rommel congratulated Brigadier James Hargest on the determined New Zealand defence. The 21st Panzer Division ran into the 22nd battalion, 5th New Zealand Infantry Brigade at Bir el Menastir while it was heading west to Tobruk from Bardia. After an exchange lasting most of the day, it was forced to detour south via Sidi Azeiz, which delayed its return to Tobruk by a day. By early afternoon, the Eighth Army HQ had known by radio intercepts that both divisions of the Afrika Korps were heading west to Tobruk, with the "Ariete" Division on their left. The audacious manoeuvre by Afrika Korps had failed but come within 4 mi (6.4 km) of 50 Field Maintenance Centre, the supply base of XIII Corps.

The dash of the Afrika Korps to the south removed a severe threat to the left flank of the New Zealand Division, which had remained ignorant of the danger because news of the losses of the 7th Armoured Division had not reached XIII Corps and German tank losses had been wildly overestimated. The New Zealand Division engaged elements of the Afrika, "Trieste", "Bologna" and "Pavia" Divisions, advanced westwards and retook the Sidi Rezegh airfield and the overlooking positions to the north that led to Tobruk. The 70th Infantry Division resumed its attack on 26 November, and the next day, elements linked with the advancing New Zealanders of the 4th New Zealand Brigade at Ed Duda on the Tobruk by-pass. The 6th New Zealand Brigade cleared the Sidi Rezegh escarpment in a mutually-costly engagement.

=== Third phase ===
==== 27 November ====
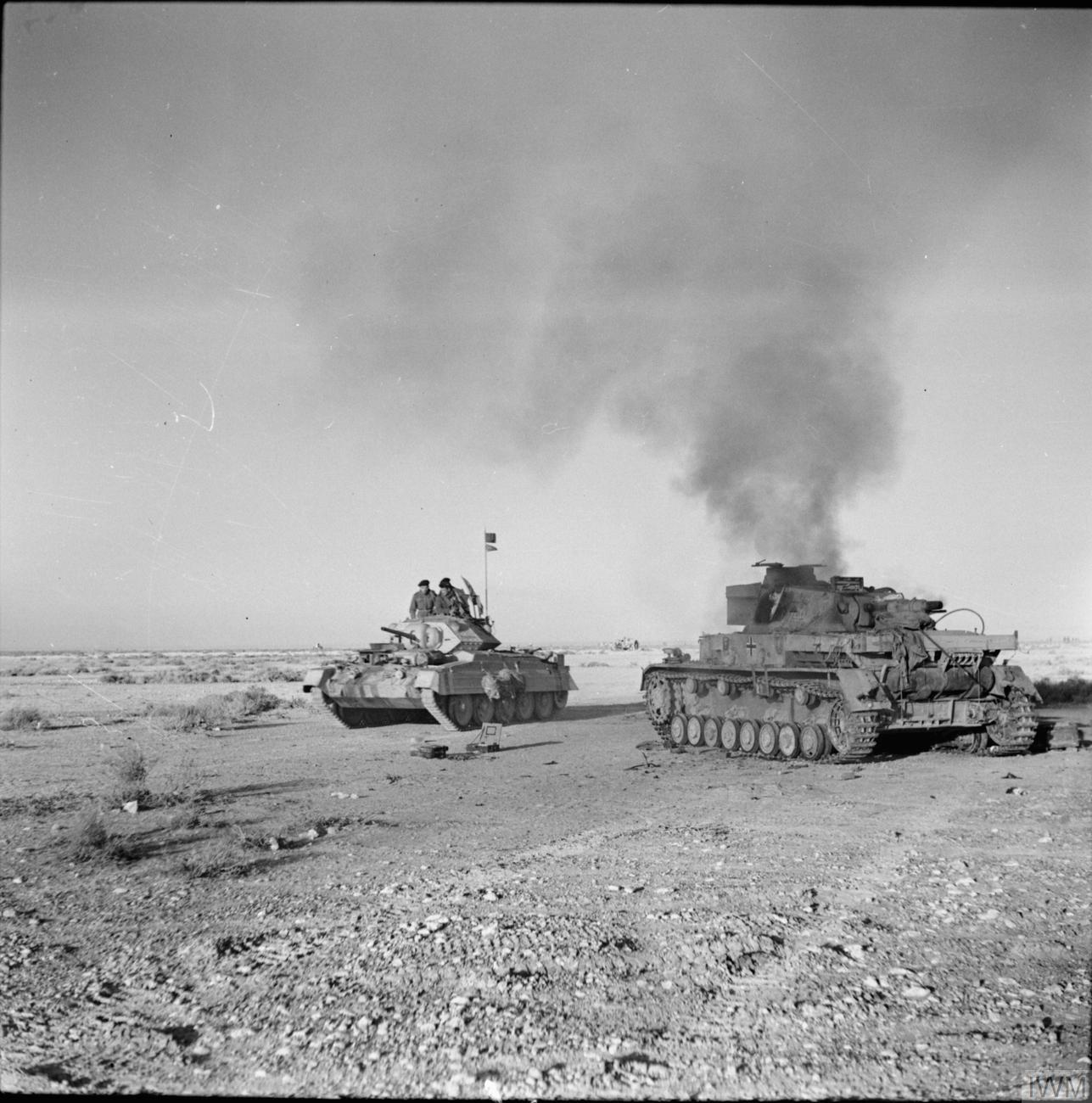
Crusader tank passes a burning Panzer IV (27 November 1941)

At noon on 27 November, the 15th Panzer Division reached Bir el Chleta and met the 22nd Armoured Brigade, which had been reorganised as a composite regiment with less than 50 tanks. By the afternoon, the 22nd Armoured Brigade was holding on and the 4th Armoured Brigade, with 70 tanks, had arrived on the left flank of the 15th Panzer Division, having dashed over 20 mi (32 km) north-east and begun harassing its rear echelons. The 15th Panzer Division was also suffering losses from bombing. As night fell, the British tanks disengaged to replenish, inexplicably moving south, which left the route west open for the 15th Panzer Division. The New Zealand Division, engaged in heavy fighting on the south-eastern end of the tenuous corridor into Tobruk, would be vulnerable to the Afrika Korps.

By 27 November, the situation of the Eighth Army had improved since XXX Corps had reorganised after the chaos of the breakthrough and the New Zealand Division had linked up with the Tobruk garrison. Auchinleck had spent three days during the breakthrough with Cunningham and on the 25 November handed him a directive on 25 November before returning to Cairo,

You will therefore continue to attack the enemy relentlessly using all your resources, even to the last tank. Your ultimate object remains the conquest of Cyrenaica and then to advance on Tripoli....

Cunningham immediately gave orders for XIII Corps to take up the advance and Auchinleck wrote to him to say that 'You loyally accepted this decision, and at once gave orders to give effect to it'. Once in Cairo, Auchinleck was persuaded by Air Marshal Tedder to relieve Cunningham and substituted him with his Deputy Chief of the General Staff, Major-General Neil Ritchie, promoting him to acting lieutenant-general.

==== Tobruk corridor ====
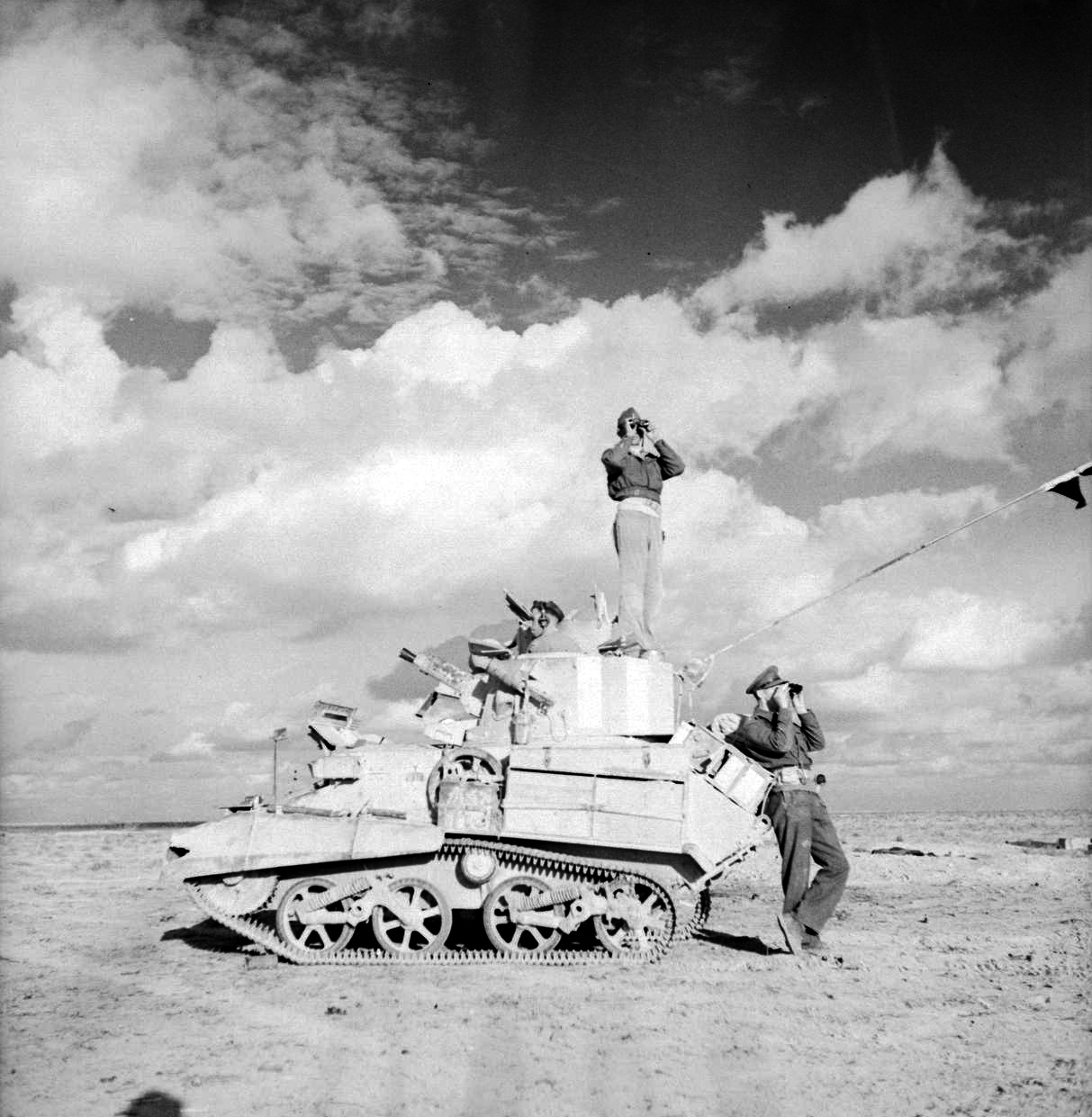
The crew of a Light Tank Mk VIB reconnoitring (28 November 1941)

From 26 to 27 November, the 70th Infantry Division killed or captured the Italian defenders of several concrete pillboxes and reached Ed Duda. On 27 November, the 6th New Zealand Infantry Brigade attacked a battalion of the 9th Bersaglieri Regiment, dug in around the Prophet's Tomb using machine-guns to great effect. The 6th New Zealand Brigade managed to link up with the 32nd Tank Brigade at Ed Duda creating a small bridgehead. By 28 November, Bologna had regrouped largely in the Bu Amud and Belhamed areas and deployed along 8 mi (13 km) of the Via Balbia to the Tobruk bypass. On the night of 27/28 November, Rommel wanted to cut the Tobruk corridor and to destroy the defenders. Crüwell first wanted to eliminate the 7th Armoured Division tanks to the south. The 15th Panzer Division spent most of 28 November engaged with the 4th Armoured Brigade and the 22nd Armoured Brigade and looking for supplies. Despite being outnumbered 2–1 in tanks and at times being immobile because of lack of fuel, the 15th Panzer Division pushed the British tanks southwards and then moved to the west.

On 28 November, fighting continued around the Tobruk corridor. It had not been possible to consolidate the junction of the 70th Infantry Division and the 2nd New Zealand Division, which hampered co-ordination. When two Italian motorised battalions of Bersaglieri, with tanks, anti-tank guns and artillery, moved toward Sidi Rezegh, they overran a New Zealand field hospital and captured 1,000 patients and 700 medical staff. About 200 Germans, held captive in the enclosure on the grounds of the hospital, were liberated.

At 6:00 p.m., the Australian 2/13th Battalion moved to reinforce Ed Duda, where several platoons suffered severe casualties from artillery-fire. On the night of 28 November, Rommel rejected Crüwell's plan for a direct advance towards Tobruk since frontal attacks during the siege had failed. He decided on a circling movement to attack Ed Duda from the south-west, move on to cut off British forces outside the Tobruk perimeter and to destroy them. Early on 29 November, the 15th Panzer Division set off west, south of Sidi Rezegh. The remnants of the 21st Panzer Division were supposed to be moving up on their right to form a pincer but were in disarray when Ravenstein was captured reconnoitring that morning. In the afternoon, to the east of Sidi Rezegh, at the Action at Point 175, elements of Ariete overran the 21st New Zealand Battalion. The New Zealanders thought that reinforcements from the 1st South African Brigade had arrived from the south-west and held their fire.

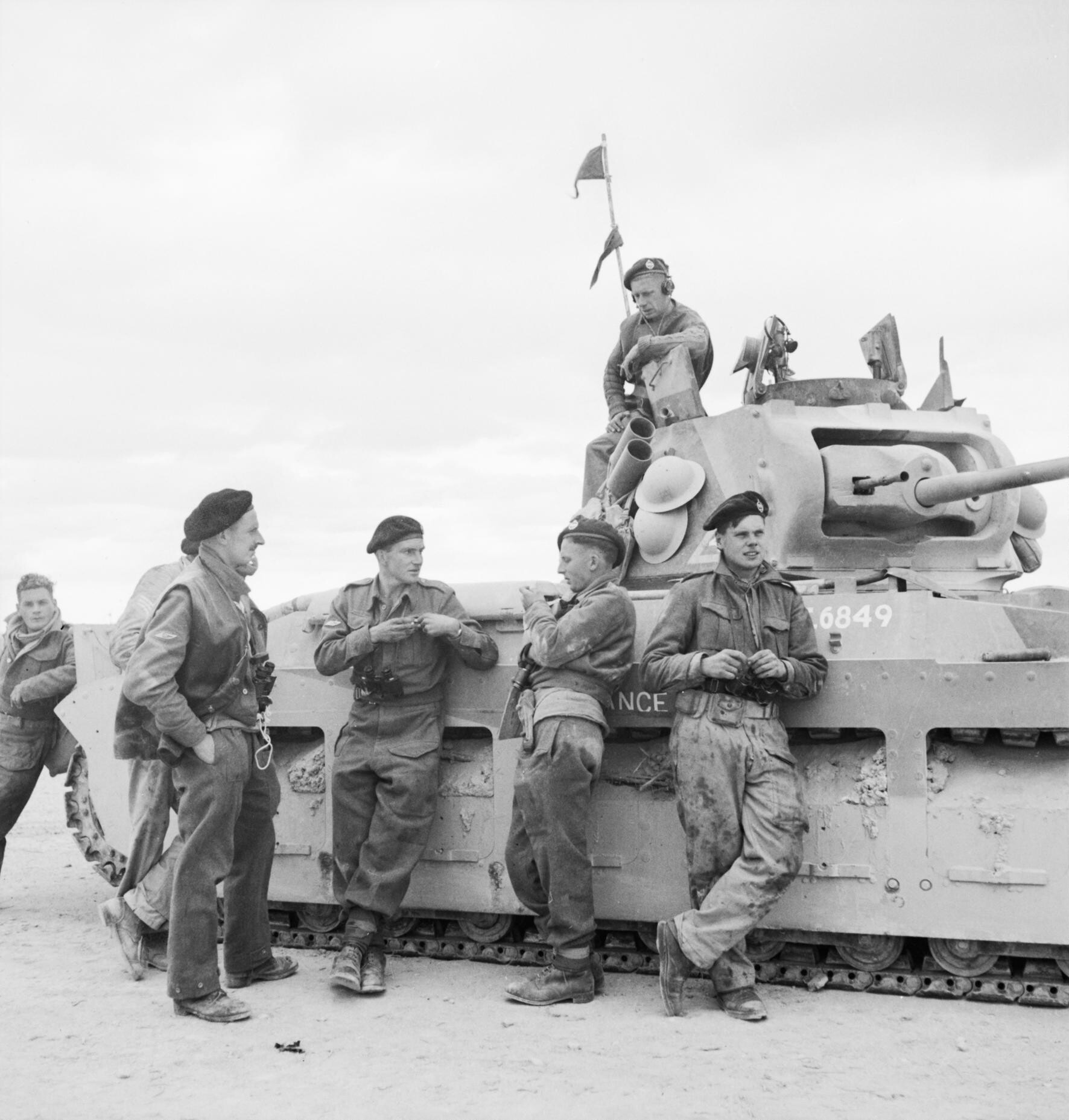
Crew of a Matilda tank take a break ( 28 November 1941)

Lieutenant-Colonel Howard Kippenberger wrote,

About 5.30 p.m. damned Italian Motorized Division (Ariete) turned up. They passed with five tanks leading, twenty following, and a huge column of transport and guns and rolled straight over our infantry on Pt. 175.

The 24th and 26th Battalions met a similar fate at Sidi Rezegh on 30 November. On 1 December, a German armoured attack on Belhamed almost destroyed the 20th Battalion. The New Zealanders suffered 879 dead, 1,699 wounded and 2,042 captured.

The leading elements of the 15th Panzer Division had reached Ed Duda but before night fell, were held up by the defenders. A counter-attack by the 4th Royal Tank Regiment and Australian infantry recaptured the positions, forcing the Germans back 1,000 yd (910 m). On 29 November, the two British Armoured Brigades did little. The 1st South African Brigade was unable to move in the open without the armoured brigades because of the danger of German tanks. On the evening of 29 November, the 1st South African Brigade came under the command of the 2nd New Zealand Division and ordered to advance north to recapture Point 175. Wireless intercepts led the Eighth Army HQ to believe that the 21st Panzer Division and Ariete were in difficulty; Ritchie ordered the 7th Armoured Division to "stick to them like hell". Eight Matilda tanks provided the preliminary bombardment for a counter-attack by two companies of the 2/13th Australian Infantry Battalion on the night of 29/30 November. In a bayonet charge against German positions, the 2/13th suffered two killed, five wounded and took 167 prisoners.

After the fighting at Ed Duda, Rommel ordered the 15th Panzer Division to Bir Bu Creimisa, 5 mi (8.0 km) to the south and attack again north-eastwards on 30 November between Sidi Rezegh and Belhamed, leaving Ed Duda outside the encirclement. By mid-afternoon, the 6th New Zealand Brigade had come under severe pressure on the west end of the Sidi Rezegh position. The 24th Australian Battalion and two companies of 26th Battalion were overrun but on the eastern flank, the 25th Australian Battalion repulsed Ariete as it moved from Point 175.

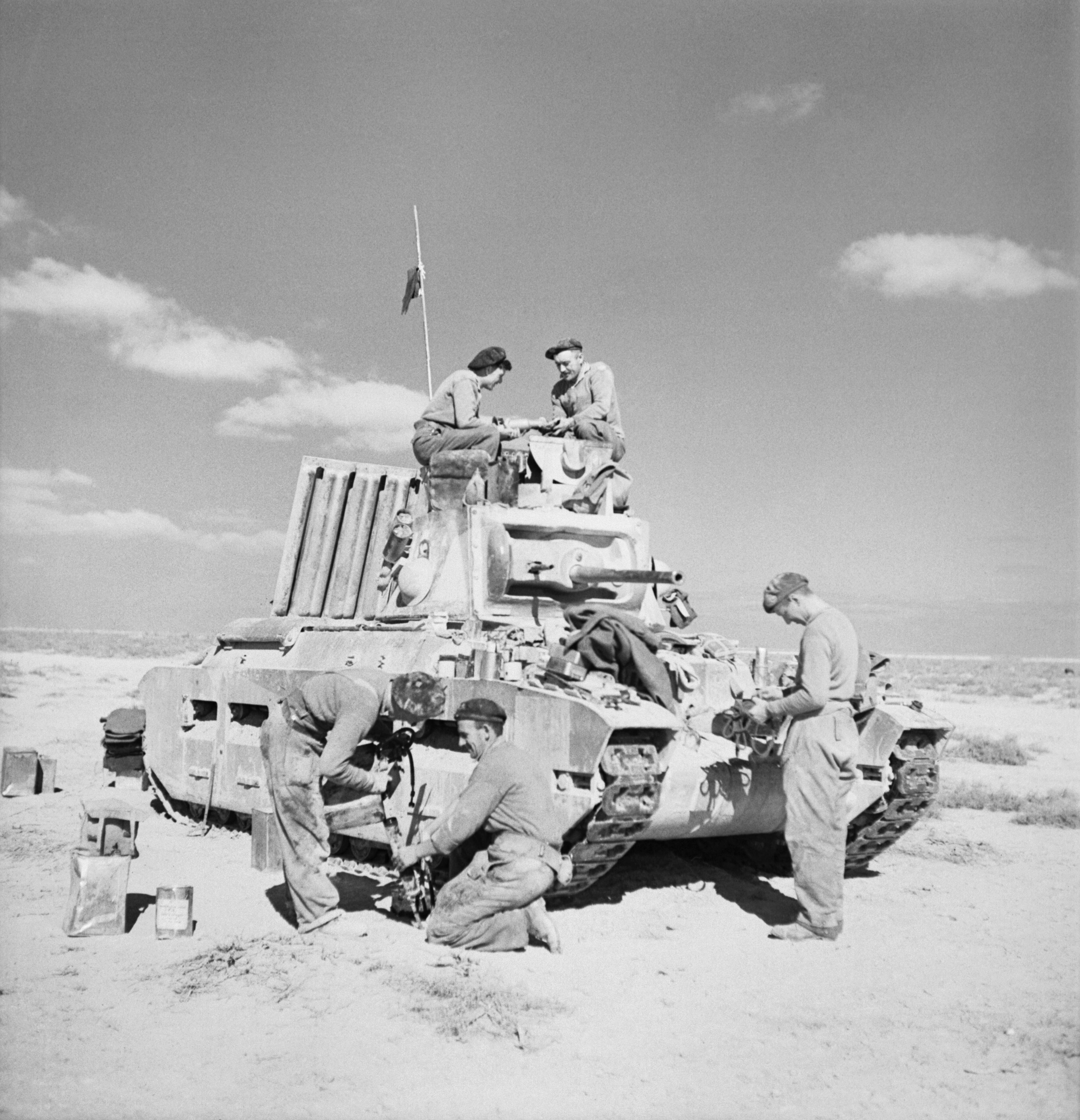
A Matilda tank crew servicing their vehicle near Tobruk, 1 December 1941

At 6:15 a.m. on 1 December, the 15th Panzer Division resumed its attack towards Belhamed, supported by a massed artillery-fire, imposing severe pressure on the 2nd New Zealand Division. During the morning, the 7th Armoured Division was ordered to advance and reinforce the New Zealanders. The 4th Armoured Brigade arrived at Belhamed, outnumbering about forty panzers of the 15th Panzer Division. The 4th Armoured Brigade thought that they were to cover the withdrawal of the 6th New Zealand Brigade, rather than attack.

The remains of the 2nd New Zealand Division were now concentrated near Zaafran, 5 mi (8.0 km) east of Belhamed. Early on 1 December, Freyberg saw a signal from the Eighth Army HQ indicating that the 1st South African Brigade would be under the command of the 7th Armoured Division and inferred that HQ had lost hope of holding the Tobruk corridor. He signalled in mid-morning that without the South Africans, his position would be untenable and was planning a withdrawal. Freyberg ordered the 2nd New Zealand Division to be ready to move east at 5:30 a.m. The 15th Panzer Division, which had been replenishing, attacked again at 4:30 p.m. and "Trieste" cut the link with Tobruk.

The 2nd New Zealand Division made a fighting withdrawal from its western positions. The troops had formed up by 1:30 p.m. and having paused an hour for the tanks and artillery to join them from the west, set off at 6:45 p.m. reaching XXX Corps. In the early hours, the 3,500 men and 700 vehicles that had emerged, headed back to Egypt.

==== Sollum ====
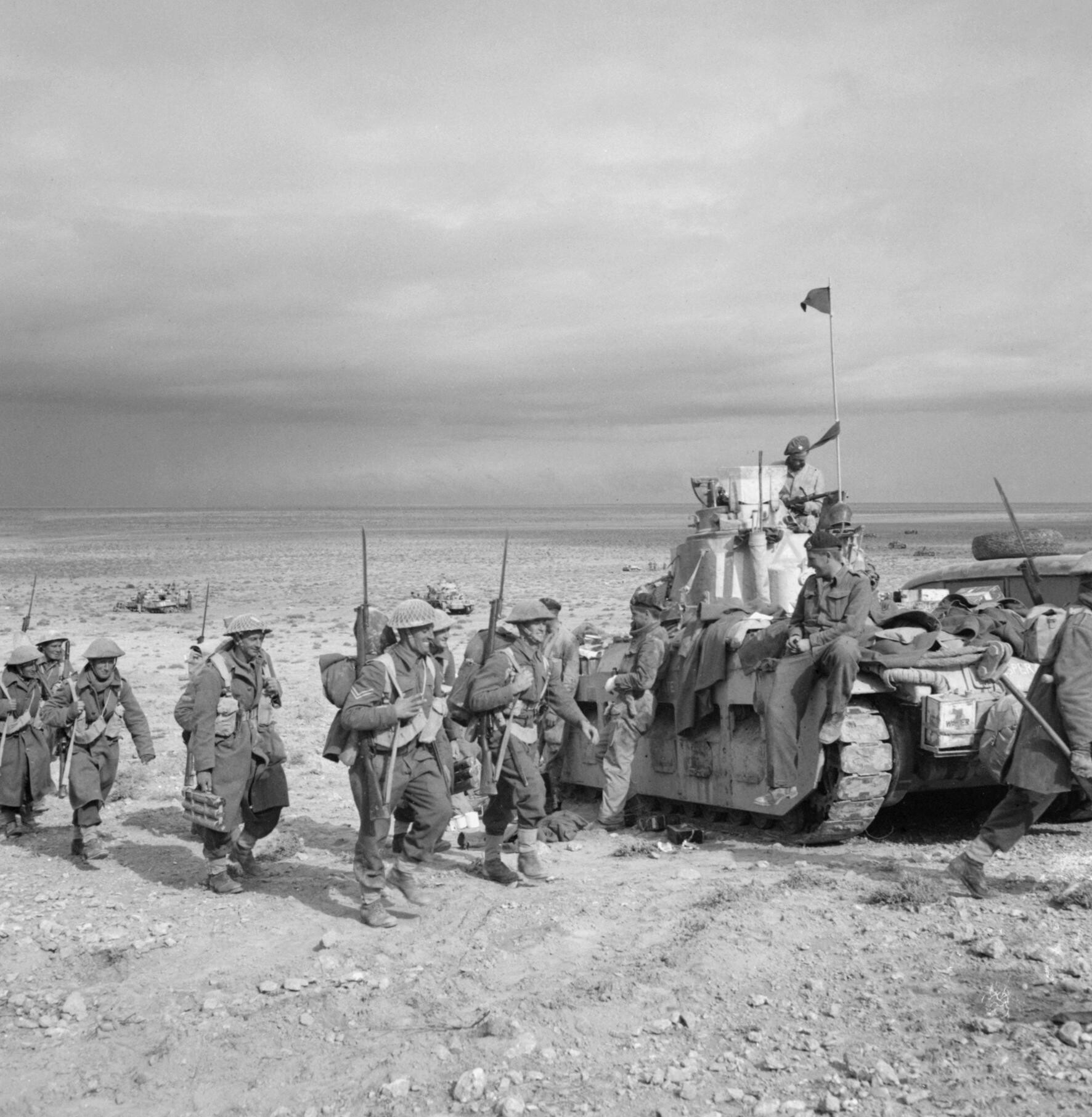
Infantry of the 2nd New Zealand Division link up with Matilda tanks of the Tobruk garrison, 2 December 1941

On 2 December, believing that he would not be attacked until 3 December, Rommel sent two columns, each comprising an infantry battalion, an anti-tank company and some artillery to open the routes to Bardia, Capuzzo and Sollum, with XX Corps along the Trigh Capuzzo, guarding the southern flank. On 3 December, the German columns were spotted by air reconnaissance, despite poor weather. The northern column was ambushed by the 5th New Zealand Infantry Brigade on the Bardia road, 10 mi (16 km) west of the port, near Menastir and "almost annihilated" (Playfair, 2004).

The southern column, on the Trigh Capuzzo, met Goldforce (based on the Central India Horse reconnaissance regiment) and was subjected to an artillery bombardment and attacked by Blenheim bombers and Hurricane fighter-bombers. On 3 December, Rommel ordered the capture Ed Duda to open the Tobruk bypass and another attempt to relieve the frontier forts. On 4 December, the attack on Ed Duda was abandoned and the columns heading towards Bardia and Sidi Azeiz were recalled. Rommel decided to send the two panzer divisions with the "Ariete" Division and the "Trieste" Division southwards, which depleted the force around Tobruk; the troops on the eastern side were withdrawn.

==== Ed Duda ====
On 4 December, the 21st Panzer Division attacked Ed Duda against the 14th Infantry Brigade of the 70th Infantry Division but was only able to reach the bypass. When it was clear that the attack would fail, Rommel resolved to withdraw from the eastern perimeter of Tobruk to allow him to concentrate his strength against the growing threat of XXX Corps to the south.

==== Bir el Gubi ====
After the withdrawal of 2nd New Zealand Division, Ritchie had reorganised his rear echelon units to release the 5th and 11th Indian Infantry Brigades of the 4th Indian Infantry Division and the 22nd Guards Brigade; these were to strike north and cut off the retreating Axis forces. By 4 December, the 11th Indian Infantry Brigade, supported by 16 Valentine tanks, was in action against a strongpoint near Bir el Gubi, about 25 mi (40 km) south of Ed Duda. The I and II battalions of 136th "Giovani Fascisti" Regiment held two positions at Bir el Gubi. One fell quickly to the Indians, but the other was successfully defended for three days, thanks in part to the arrival of 49 German panzers.

Although Norrie had an overwhelming superiority in every arm in the area of Bir el Gubi, the failure to concentrate them and co-ordinate the action of all arms in detail had allowed one Italian battalion group to frustrate the action of his whole corps and inflict heavy casualties on one brigade.

— John Gooch

The 11th Indian Brigade infantry had been left vulnerable because Norrie ordered the 4th Armoured Brigade move eastwards due to a threat to Bardia and Sollum.

On 4 December, the Pavia Division and Trento Division counter-attacked the 70th Infantry Division to contain them within the Tobruk perimeter. On 5 December, the 11th Indian Infantry Brigade continued its attritional attack against Point 174. As dusk approached, the Afrika Korps and the Ariete Division intervened to relieve the Young Fascist garrison at Point 174 and attacked the 11th Indian Infantry Brigade. Crüwell was unaware that the 4th Armoured Brigade, with 126 tanks, was over 20 mi (32 km) away and withdrew to the west. The 11th Indian Brigade had to be withdrawn to be refitted and replaced by the 22nd Guards Brigade. The 4th Armoured Brigade made no move to close up to the 22nd Guards Brigade on 6 December but Crüwell hesitated and dark fell. By 7 December, the 4th Armoured Brigade had closed up and the Axis opportunity had been lost. Neumann-Silkow, the commander of the 15th Panzer Division, was mortally wounded late on 6 December.

==== Gazala line ====
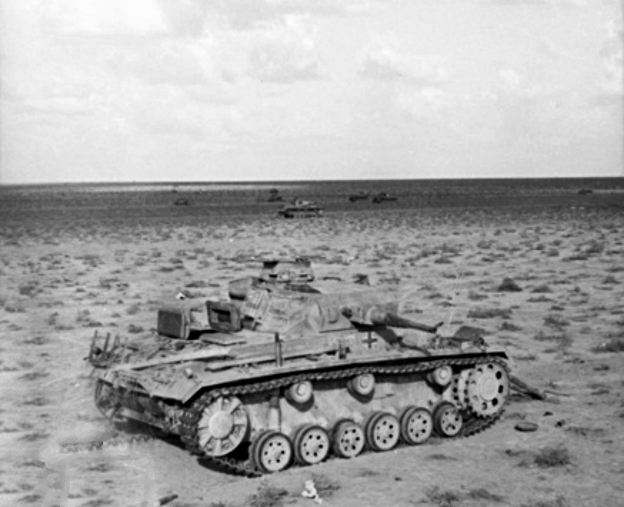
Damaged Panzer IIIs at Belhamed, 16 December 1941

On 7 December, the 4th Armoured Brigade engaged the 15th Panzer Division, disabling 11 more tanks. Rommel had been told on 5 December by the Italian Comando Supremo that supply could not improve until the end of the month with the start of the airborne supply from Sicily. Realising that success was now unlikely at Bir el Gubi, he decided to narrow his front and to shorten his lines of communication by abandoning the Tobruk front and withdrawing to the positions at Gazala, 10 mi (16 km) to his rear. They had been prepared by Italian rear echelon units and had been occupied by 8 December. He placed the Italian X Corps at the coastal end of the line and the Italian XXI Corps inland. The weakened Italian Mobile Corps anchored the southern end of the line at Alem Hamza while the Afrika Korps were placed behind the southern flank ready to counter-attack.

On 6 December, Rommel ordered his divisions to retreat westwards and on 8 December Comando Supremo and OKW ordered the Italian and German garrisons at Sollum, Halfaya and Bardia to resist for as long as possible. On 19 December Rommel requested a naval evacuation but this was refused. Bardia surrendered on 2 January 1942 and on 17 January the Axis troops around Halfaya Pass capitulated. On the night of 6/7 December, the 70th Division captured the German-held Walter and Freddie strong points without any resistance. A Pavia battalion, dug in on Point 157, inflicted heavy casualties on the 2nd Durham Light Infantry, before it was overcome after midnight. Although the 90th Light Division pulled out of the Tobruk sector on 4 December, Bologna held out until the night of 8/9 December, when trucks were finally assigned to give them some support. In a final action on the part of the 70th Division, the Polish Carpathian Brigade attacked elements of Brescia, followed the Axis retreat and captured the White Knoll position.

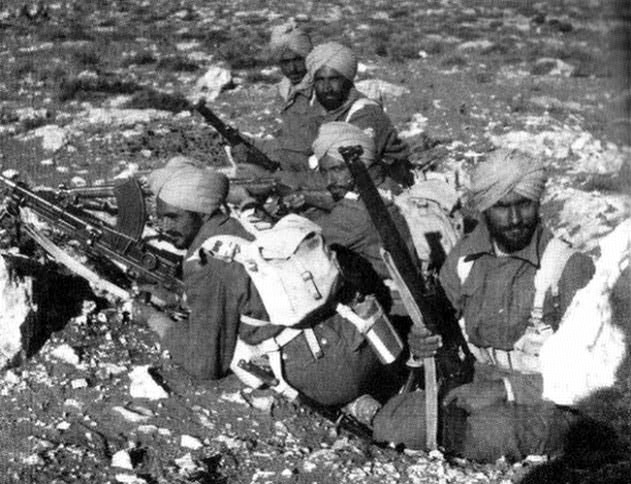
A group of Sikh soldiers from the Indian Army during the operation

Better to co-ordinate his infantry and armour, Ritchie transferred the 7th Armoured Division to XIII Corps and directed the XXX Corps HQ to take the 2nd South African Division under command to conduct a siege of the border fortresses. He also sent forward to XIII Corps the 4th Indian Infantry Division and the 5th New Zealand Infantry Brigade. The Eighth Army launched its attack on the Gazala line on 13 December and the 5th New Zealand Brigade attacked along an 8 mi (13 km) front from the coast. The 5th Indian Infantry Brigade made a flanking attack at Alem Hamza. Although Trieste held Alem Hamza, the 1st Battalion, The Buffs from the 5th Indian Infantry Division took Point 204, some miles west of Alem Hamza. They were thus left in a salient and the 7th Indian Infantry Brigade to their left was ordered to send northwards the 4th battalion 11th Sikh Regiment, supported by guns from the 25th Field Regiment RA and twelve Valentine tanks from the 8th Royal Tank Regiment, to ease their position. The force found itself confronted by the Afrika Korps, fielding 39 tanks and 300 lorries of infantry and guns. Once again, the 7th Armoured Division was not in place to intervene and it was left to the force's artillery and supporting tanks to face the threat. They took heavy casualties but managed to knock out 15 German tanks and repulse the counter-attack.

Godwin-Austen ordered Gott to get the British armour to a position from where it could engage the Afrika Korps since he was unaware that Gott and his senior commanders were no longer confident they could defeat the enemy directly, despite their superiority in numbers. Due to the Germans' superior tactics and anti-tank artillery, British commanders preferred making a wide detour to attack their soft-skinned elements and lines of supply, to immobilise them. On 14 December, the Polish Independent Brigade was brought forward to join the New Zealanders and prepare a new attack for the early hours of 15 December. The attack went in at 03:00, taking the defenders by surprise. Both brigades made good progress but narrowly failed to breach the line. On 14 December, to the south, there was little activity from the Afrika Korps and the 7th Indian Infantry Brigade was limited to patrolling through a shortage of ammunition as supply problems multiplied. At Alem Hamza, the 5th Indian Infantry Brigade attacked again but made no progress against determined resistance and at Point 204 the 5th Indian Brigade's battalion of Royal East Kent Regiment ("The Buffs"), supported by ten I tanks, an armoured car squadron of the Central India Horse, a company of Bombay Sappers and Miners, the artillery of 31st Field Regiment RA and elements of the 73rd Anti-Tank Regiment and some anti-aircraft guns, were attacked by ten or twelve tanks, the remnants of Ariete, which they beat off.

On 15 December, Brescia and Pavia, with Trento in close support, repelled a strong Polish–New Zealand attack, freeing the 15th Panzer Division, which had returned to the Gazala Line, to be used elsewhere.

The Poles and New Zealanders made good initial progress, but the Italians rallied well, and by noon it was clear to [General Alfred] Godwin-Austen that his two brigades lacked the weight to achieve a breakthrough on the right flank. It was the same story in the centre, where the Italians of 'Trieste' continued to repulse 5th Indian Brigade’s attack on Point 208. By mid-afternoon the III Corps attack had been fought to a halt all along the line.

— Richard Humble

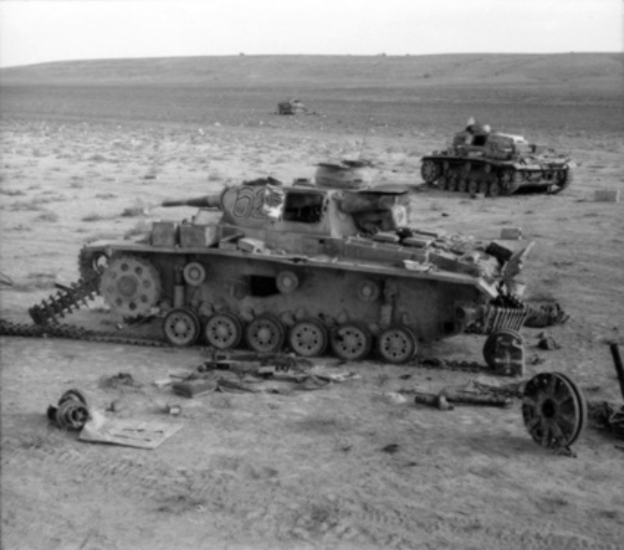
Damaged Panzer IIIs near Belhamded, 16 December 1941

Rommel considered Point 204 a key position and many of the neighbouring armoured and infantry units were committed to attack it on 15 December. In fierce and determined fighting, the attacking force, Ariete, the 15th Panzer Division, with 8th Bersaglieri Regiment and 115th Lorried Infantry Regiment overran the Buffs and its supporting elements during the afternoon. The Buffs lost over 1,000 men killed or captured with only 71 men and a battery of field artillery escaping. It was too late in the day for the attacking force to collect itself and to advance further to intervene at Alem Hamza. The attackers also had suffered heavily in the engagement and the German commander was heard on a radio intercept to report the inability of his force to exploit his success because of the losses sustained. By 15 December, Afrika Korps were down to eight operational tanks and Ariete about thirty. Rommel, who had greater respect for the 7th Armoured Division than either Crüwell (or apparently even Gott) became very concerned about a perceived flanking move to the south by the British armour. Despite the vehement objections of the Italian generals and Crüwell, Rommel ordered an evacuation of the Gazala line on the night of the 15/16 December.

By the afternoon of 15 December, the 4th Armoured Brigade, having looped round to the south, was at Bir Halegh el Eleba, some 30 mi (48 km) north-west of Alem Hamza and was ideally placed both to strike at the rear of the Afrika Korps and to advance north to cut the main lines communication of Panzer Group Afrika along the coast, as Godwin-Austen urged. Early on 16 December, only a small detachment was sent north, which caused serious confusion among Panzer Group Afrika's rear echelon but was not decisive and the rest of the brigade headed south to meet its petrol supplies. In the afternoon, the 15th Panzer Division, moving west, passed by the rear of the 4th Armoured Brigade and blocked any return move to the north. The mere presence of the British armour had prompted Rommel to withdraw from Gazala but the opportunity for the British to gain a big victory had been missed.

=== Axis retreat ===
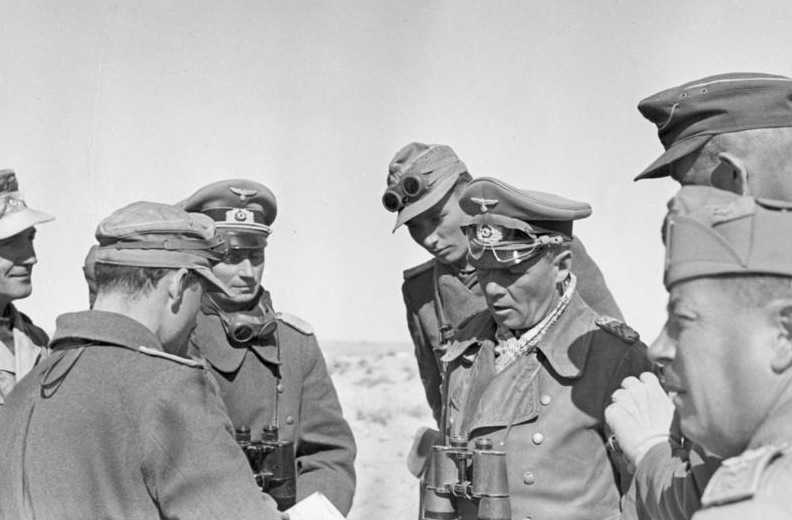
Rommel conversing with his staff near El Agheila, 12 January 1942

For ten days, the Axis forces withdrew to a line between Ajedabia and El Haseia, maintaining their lines of communication and avoiding being cut off, unlike the Italians in 1940–1941. As the Axis lines of supply shortened and deliveries to El Agheila improved, Rommel rebuilt the Axis tank force as the Eighth Army lines of supply lengthened. On 27 December, during a three-day tank battle at El Haseia, the 22nd Armoured Brigade was severely depleted, which forced the vanguard of the Eighth Army to withdraw. The Axis forces fell back to a better defensive line at El Agheila in the first two weeks of January.

== Aftermath ==
The Axis threat to Egypt and the Suez Canal had been ended but the Axis strongholds on the Libya–Egypt border remained, despite Rommel's recommendation for an evacuation by sea, to block the coast road and tie down Allied troops. In early December, the Allies decided that clearing the Axis frontier positions was necessary to clear their supply lines and maintain the momentum of their advance. On 16 December, the 2nd South African Division attacked Bardia, garrisoned by 2,200 German and 6,600 Italian troops and on 2 January fell to the South Africans on 12 January after a small but determined engagement.

The South Africans surrounded the fortified Halfaya Pass (which included the escarpment, the plateau above it and the surrounding ravines) and cut it off from the sea. The garrison of 4,200 Italians of the 55th Infantry Division "Savona" and 2,100 Germans was already desperately short of food and water. The defences against artillery and aerial bombardment led to relatively few casualties but hunger and thirst forced General Fedele De Giorgis and Major Wilhelm Bach to capitulate on 17 January. On 21 January, Rommel launched a surprise attack from El Agheila. The action was a "reconnaissance in force" but when Rommel found the Eighth Army forward elements to be dispersed and tired, he took advantage and drove the Eighth Army back to Gazala.

== Orders of battle ==
=== Eighth Army ===
The Western Desert Force was renamed the Eighth Army (Lieutenant-General Alan Cunningham) to 25 November, then Neil Ritchie. The Eighth Army had XXX Corps (Lieutenant-General Willoughby Norrie) which comprised the 7th Armoured Division (Major-General William Gott), the 4th Armoured brigade Group, the 1st South African Division (Major-General George Brink) less one brigade, that had recently arrived from the East African campaign and the 22nd Guards Brigade to defend XXX Corps communications, supplies and landing grounds. XIII Corps (Lieutenant-General Reade Godwin-Austen). comprised the 4th Indian Infantry Division (Major-General Frank Messervy), the 2nd New Zealand Division (Major-General Bernard Freyberg) recently arrived and the 1st Army Tank Brigade.

The Tobruk garrison was composed of the 70th Infantry Division (Major-General Ronald Scobie, the garrison commander), the Carpathian Infantry Brigade Group (Major-General Stanisław Kopański) and the 32nd Army Tank Brigade (Brigadier Arthur Willison). In November, the 20th Australian Brigade (Brigadier John Murray) was still in Tobruk. The 2nd South African Division was in army reserve and Oasis Force (Brigadier D. W. Reid) comprised the 29th Indian Infantry Brigade Group and the 6th South African Armoured Car Regiment. The Eighth Army had the equivalent of seven divisions with 770 tanks (including many of the new Crusader Cruiser tanks and new American M3 Stuart light tanks). Air support was provided by up to 724 front-line aircraft of the Air Headquarters Western Desert and Malta. (Note: 650 aircraft (550 serviceable) were based in Egypt, and the other 74 (66 serviceable) were based in Malta.)

=== Axis ===
Data from Playfair (2004) unless indicated

- Comando Superiore Forze Armate in Africa Settentrionale (Generale d'Armata Ettore Bastico)

=== Frontier defences ===
Axis frontier defences, Sollum to Tobruk, 1941

- 55th Infantry Division "Savona". (Note: Most Italian infantry divisions in North Africa were classed as motor-transportable, with enough vehicles to move artillery and services but not infantry, which could be moved only by vehicles attached to corps and army headquarters and always busy moving supplies. Italian infantry divisions fought as marching units in the Western Desert campaign.)
- Division z.b.V. Afrika to 28 November 1941; renamed the 90th Light Afrika Division

The Axis forces had built fortified points along the escarpment running from near the sea at Bardia, eastwards along the coast to Sollum and westwards along the border wire to Fort Capuzzo, manned by the Savona Division and Division zbV Afrika. Rommel kept the rest of his forces near Tobruk, where an attack on 14 November had been put back to 24 November due to supply difficulties.

=== Panzergruppe Afrika ===
Panzergruppe Afrika (General Erwin Rommel since July 1941)

- Deutsches Afrika Korps (Lieutenant-General Ludwig Crüwell)
  - 15th Panzer Division
  - 21st Panzer Division

(The DAK had 260 tanks.)

=== Tobruk ===
- XXI Corps (Generale di corpo d'Armata [Lieutenant-General] Enea Navarini)
  - 17th Infantry Division "Pavia"
  - 102nd Motorized Division "Trento" (Note: While a motorised unit, most of its lorries were away hauling supplies and fought the Western Desert campaign as a marching unit, the 7th Bersaglieri Regiment almost permanently detached as a Corps motorised reserve.)
  - 27th Infantry Division "Brescia"
  - 25th Infantry Division "Bologna"

=== West of Tobruk ===
- XX Mobile Corps (Generale di corpo d'Armata [Lieutenant-General] Gastone Gambara; subordinated to Panzergruppe Afrika on 23 November.)
  - 132nd Armoured Division "Ariete" 146 medium M13/40 tanks
  - 101st Motorised Division "Trieste"

=== Fliegerführer Afrika ===
On 15 November, Fliegerführer Afrika (Generalmajor Stefan Fröhlich) had 140 Luftwaffe aircraft but only 76 were operational, 35 being Bf 109F4 fighters (27 serviceable) with 12 Bf 110s, seven serviceable. In Greece, Fliegerkorps X had 181 aircraft (104 operational) which could provide assistance.

=== 5° Squadra aerea ===
In Libya, the Italian 5° Squadra aerea, (Generale di squadra aerea Vittorio Marchese) had about 441 aircraft of which 154 were fighters (304 serviceable aircraft).

== See also ==
- List of Australian military equipment of World War II
- List of British military equipment of World War II
- List of German military equipment of World War II
- List of Italian Army equipment in World War II
- List of North African airfields during World War II
- List of World War II battles
- Timeline of the North African campaign

== Bibliography ==
=== Books ===
- Boog, H.; Rahn, W.; Stumpf, R.; Wegner, B. (2001). The Global War: Widening of the Conflict into a World War and the Shift of the Initiative 1941–1943. Germany in the Second World War. Vol. VI. Translated by Osers, E.; Brownjohn, J.; Crampton, P.; Willmot, L. (Eng trans. Oxford University Press, London ed.). Potsdam: Militärgeschichtliches Forschungsamt (Research Institute for Military History). ISBN 0-19-822888-0.
  - Stumpf, Reinhard. "PART V The War in the Mediterranean Area 1942–1943: Operations in North Africa and the Central Mediterranean. I. The Opening of the second German–Italian Offensive in North Africa and the Battle of Malta, 1. The Reconquest of Cyrenaica". In Boog et al. (2001), pp. 631–654.
- Chant, Christopher (2013). The Encyclopedia of Codenames of World War II. Routledge. ISBN 978-1-134-64787-3.
- Creveld, M. van (1977). Supplying War: Logistics from Wallenstein to Patton. Cambridge: Cambridge University Press. ISBN 0-521-29793-1.
- Cox, Peter (2015). Desert War: The Battle of Sidi Rezegh. Wollombi, NSW: Exisle Publishing. ISBN 978-0-369-37229-1.
- French, David (2000). Raising Churchill's Army: The British Army and the War against Germany 1939–1945. Oxford: Oxford University Press. ISBN 0-19-820641-0.
- Greene, Jack; Massignani, Alessandro (1999) [1994]. Rommel's North Africa campaign: September 1940 – November 1942. Cambridge, MA: Da Capo. ISBN 978-1-58097-018-1.
- Hinsley, Harry; Thomas, E. E.; Ransom, C. F. G.; Knight, R. C. (1981). British Intelligence in the Second World War: Its Influence on Strategy and Operations. History of the Second World War. Vol. II. New York: Cambridge University Press. ISBN 978-0-521-24290-5.
- Humble, Richard (1987). Crusader: Eighth Army's Forgotten Victory, November 1941 – January 1942. London: Leo Cooper. ISBN 978-0-85052-284-6.
- Hrbek, Jaroslav; Smetana, Vít (2009). Draze zaplacená svoboda: osvobození Československa 1944–1945 [Freedom Dearly Paid: The Liberation of Czechoslovakia] (in Czech). Vol. I. Praha: Paseka. ISBN 978-8-07-185976-5.
- Kippenberger, Howard (1949). Infantry Brigadier. New Zealand Texts Collection (online ed.). Wellington, New Zealand: Oxford University Press. OCLC 276433219. Archived from the original on 22 April 2012 – via New Zealand Electronic Text Centre.
- Koskodan, Kenneth K. (2009). No Greater Ally: The Untold Story of Poland's Forces in World War II. Oxford: Osprey. ISBN 978-1-84603-365-0.
- Lyman, Robert (2009). The Longest Siege: Tobruk, The Battle That Saved North Africa. Pan Australia. ISBN 978-0-23071-024-5.
- Mackenzie, Compton (1951). Eastern Epic. London: Chatto & Windus. OCLC 1412578.
- Maughan, Barton (1966). "Chapter 10: Ed Duda" (PDF). Tobruk and El Alamein. Australia in the War of 1939–1945, Series 1 – Army. Vol. III (1st (online) ed.). Canberra: Australian War Memorial. OCLC 186193977. Archived from the original on 4 March 2016.
- McKinney, J. B. (1952). Medical Units of 2 NZEF in Middle East and Italy. The Official History of New Zealand in the Second World War 1939–1945. Wellington: Historical Publications Branch (War History Branch, Dept. of Internal Affairs). OCLC 35251107 – via New Zealand Electronic Text Collection.
- Mason, Walter Wynn (1954). "4: The Second Libyan Campaign and After (November 1941 – June 1942)". In Kippenberger, Howard (ed.). Prisoners of War. The Official History of New Zealand in the Second World War 1939–1945 (online scan ed.). Historical Publications Branch, Wellington. OCLC 4372202. Archived from the original on 18 July 2011.
- Mitcham, Samuel W. (2008). The Rise of the Wehrmacht: The German Armed Forces and World War II, 1941–43. Vol. I. Praeger. ISBN 978-0-275-99659-8.
- Murphy, W. E. (1961). Fairbrother, Monty C. (ed.). The Relief of Tobruk. The Official History of New Zealand in the Second World War 1939–1945 (online scan ed.). Wellington, NZ: War History Branch, Department of Internal Affairs. OCLC 563872639. Archived from the original on 12 July 2015 – via New Zealand Electronic Text Collection.
- Playfair, I. S. O.; Flynn, F. C.; Molony, C. J. C. & Gleave, T. P. (2004) [1960]. Butler, J. R. M. (ed.). The Mediterranean and Middle East: British Fortunes Reach their Lowest Ebb (September 1941 to September 1942). History of the Second World War United Kingdom Military Series. Vol. III (pbk. facs. repr. Naval & Military Press, Uckfield ed.). London: HMSO. ISBN 1-84574-067-X.
- Rommel, Erwin (1982) [1953]. Liddell-Hart, Basil (ed.). The Rommel Papers. Da Capo Press. ISBN 0-30680-157-4.
- Thomson, John (2000). Warrior Nation: New Zealanders at the Front, 1900–2000. Hazard Press. ISBN 978-1-877161-89-6.
- Schreiber, G.; Stegemann, B.; Vogel, D. (2015) [1995]. Falla, P. S. (ed.). The Mediterranean, South-East Europe and North Africa, 1939–1941: From Italy's Declaration of non-Belligerence to the Entry of the United States into the War. Germany and the Second World War. Vol. III. Translated by McMurry, D. S.; Osers, E.; Willmot, L. (2nd pbk. trans. Oxford University Press, Oxford ed.). Freiburg im Breisgau: Militärgeschichtliches Forschungsamt. ISBN 978-0-19-873832-9.
  - Stegemann, Bernd. "Part V The Italo-German Conduct of the War in the Mediterranean and North Africa vi. Operation Crusader". In Schreiber, Stegemann & Vogel (2015), pp. 725–755.
- Shores, C. F.; Massimello, G.; Guest, R. (2012). A History of the Mediterranean Air War 1940–1945: North Africa June 1940 – January 1942. Vol. I. London: Grub Street. ISBN 978-1-908117-07-6.
- Vincent, Dennis (2024). The Forgotten General: The Life of General Sir Alan Cunningham GCMG, KCB, DSO, MC. Amberley. ISBN 978-1-3981-1399-2.

=== Journals ===
- Glass, C. (2009). "Sidi Rezegh: Reminiscences of the late Gunner Cyril Herbert Glass, 143458, 3rd Field Regiment (Transvaal Horse Artillery)". Military History Journal. XIV (5). The South African Military History Society / Die Suid-Afrikaanse Krygshistoriese Vereniging. ISSN 0026-4016. Archived from the original on 28 March 2015.
- Gooch, John, ed. (1990). Decisive Campaigns of the Second World War. London: Frank Cass. ISBN 978-0-7146-3369-5.
- Matthews, D. (1997). "With the 5th South African Infantry Brigade at Sidi Rezegh". Military History Journal. X (6). The South African Military History Society / Die Suid-Afrikaanse Krygshistoriese Vereniging. ISSN 0026-4016. Archived from the original on 28 March 2015.

=== Theses ===
- Horn, K. (2012). South African Prisoner-of-War Experience during and after World War II: 1939 – c.1950 (PhD). Faculty of Arts and Social Sciences Stellenbosch University. oai:scholar.sun.ac.za:10019.1/71844.
