= Stegemann =

Stegemann is a surname. Notable people with the surname include:

- Albert Stegemann (born 1976), German politician
- Bernd Stegemann (1938-2014), German military and naval historian
- Greta Stegemann (born 2001), German football player
- Heinrich Stegemann (1888-1945), German Expressionist painter and sculptor
- Hermann Stegemann (1870-1945), German journalist and writer
- Jens Stegemann (born 1971), German sprint and marathon canoeist
- Kerstin Stegemann (born 1977), German footballer
- Marlies Stegemann (born 1951), German gymnast
- Regina Stegemann (born 1951) German organ builder
- Sascha Stegemann (born 1984), German football referee
- Wolf Stegemann (born 1944), German journalist, author and poet

== See also ==
- Stegeman (disambiguation)
