= Stegeman =

Stegeman may refer to:

- Herman Stegeman (1891–1939), American football coach
- John Stegeman (born 1976), Dutch football forward and manager
- Stegeman Coliseum, a multipurpose arena in Athens, Georgia, named after Herman Stegeman

== See also ==
- Stegemann (disambiguation)
- Philip Steegman (1903–1952), American portrait painter, sculptor, writer and illustrator
