= Steegmans =

Steegmans is a surname. Notable people with the surname include:

- Gert Steegmans (born 1980), Belgian cyclist
- Raymond Steegmans (born 1945), Belgian cyclist

== See also ==
- Death of René Steegmans, a violent crime in Netherlands, 2002
- Philip Steegman (1903–1952), English portrait painter, sculptor, writer and illustrator
