= Gerhard Schreiber =

German military historian

- Born: 26 July 1940; Nazi Germany
- Died: 17 May 2017 (aged 76)
- Occupations: Historian, author, editor

Academic background
- Education: Free University Berlin

Academic work
- Era: 20th century
- Institutions: Military History Research Office (MGFA)
- Main interests: Modern European history, military history, historiography
- Notable works: Germany and the Second World War

Gerhard Schreiber (26 July 1940 – 17 May 2017) was a German military historian who specialised in the German–Italian relations during the Nazi era. He was a widely published author on the history of World War II and Nazi Germany. Schreiber was a long-term researcher at the Military History Research Office (MGFA) and contributor to two volumes of the seminal series Germany and the Second World War from the MGFA.

== Education and career ==
Schreiber studied history and art history at the University of Hamburg. He earned his PhD in 1978 with a study on the German-Italian relations from 1919 to 1944; his scientific advisor was historian Klaus-Jürgen Müller. Schreiber was a researcher at the Military History Research Office (MGFA) from 1974 to 1996.

== Historian of Nazi Germany ==
Schreiber conducted extensive research into the German-Italian relations prior and during World War II, including the fate of the Italian soldiers interned by Germany after the occupation of the country by Germany in 1943. His 1990 book Deutsche Kriegsverbrechen in Italien 1943/45. Geschraten, Verachtet, vergessen" [The Italian Military Internees in the German Sphere, 1943 to 1945: Betrayed, Despised, Forgotten] is considered a standard work on the topic. Schreiber was one of the first German historians to write about the Waffen-SS and Wehrmacht crimes in Italy, including the Sant'Anna di Stazzema massacre, in his work Deutsche Kriegsverbrechen in Italien. Täter, Opfer, Strafverfolgung [German War Crimes in Italy—Culprits, Victims, Prosecution].

Schreiber contributed to volumes III The Mediterranean, South-East Europe, and North Africa 1939–1942 and VIII The Eastern Front 1943-1944: The War in the East and on the Neighbouring Fronts of Germany and the Second World War. In Volume III, Schreiber focused on "Hitler's failure to establish true alliances rather than satellite relationships in which Germany always maintained the upper hand". Historian Mark Mazower called Volume III "definitive" and praised it for its "range and intellectual energy". He notes that the authors are widely read on the topics and are familiar with the existing controversies in the field, expertly guiding the reader through them.

== Selected works ==
=== In English ===
- Germany and the Second World War
  - Vol. III: The Mediterranean, South-East Europe, and North Africa 1939–1942. With Bernd Stegemann and Detlef Vogel
  - Vol. VIII: The Eastern Front 1943–1944: The War in the East and on the Neighbouring Fronts. With Karl-Heinz Frieser, Klaus Schmider, Klaus Schönherr, Krisztián Ungváry, and Bernd Wegner

=== In German ===
- Revisionismus und Weltmachtstreben. Deutsche Verlags-Anstalt, Stuttgart 1978, ISBN 3-421-01851-0.
- Hitler-Interpretationen 1923–1983. Wissenschaftliche Buchgesellschaft, Darmstadt 1984, ISBN 3-534-07081-X.
- Die italienischen Militärinternierten im deutschen Machtbereich 1943 bis 1945. Verraten – Verachtet – Vergessen (= Beiträge zur Militärgeschichte. Band 28). Oldenbourg, München 1990, ISBN 3-486-55391-7.
- Deutsche Kriegsverbrechen in Italien. Täter, Opfer, Strafverfolgung. Beck, München 1996, ISBN 3-406-39268-7.
- Der Zweite Weltkrieg. Beck, München 2002, ISBN 3-406-44764-3. (5. Auflage 2013)
- Kurze Geschichte des Zweiten Weltkriegs. Beck, München 2005, ISBN 3-406-52953-4.
