= Detlef Vogel =

German historian (born 1942)

- Born: 1942 (age 83–84); Germany
- Occupations: Historian, author, editor

Academic work
- Era: 20th century
- Institutions: Military History Research Office (MGFA)
- Main interests: Modern European history, military history, historiography
- Notable works: Germany and the Second World War

Detlev Vogel (born 1942) is a German historian who specialises in the history of Nazi Germany and World War II. He has been a long-time employee of the German Military History Research Office (MGFA). Vogel was a contributor to two volumes of the seminal work Germany and the Second World War from the MGFA.

== Historian of Nazi Germany ==
Vogel's research into treason in Nazi Germany, in partnership with Wolfram Wette, was the first such project undertaken in Germany. Their resulting book The Last Taboo (2007) showed that, based on the documents examined so far, the soldiers acted mostly out of ethical motives and none of their actions caused harm to civilians or military personnel. It played a role in bringing about the legislative change in 2009 in Germany, when the Bundestag passed legislation officially rehabilitating military personnel judged "traitors" by the military justice system during World War II.

== Selected works ==
=== In English ===
- Germany and the Second World War
  - Vol. III: The Mediterranean, South-East Europe, and North Africa 1939–1942, with Gerhard Schreiber and Bernd Stegemann
  - Vol. VII: The Strategic Air War in Europe and the War in the West and East Asia 1943–1944/5, with Horst Boog and Gerhard Krebs
