= Bernd Stegemann =

German military historian

- Born: 1938; Nazi Germany
- Died: 2014 (aged 75–76); Germany
- Occupations: Historian, author, editor

Academic background
- Education: Free University Berlin

Academic work
- Era: 20th century
- Institutions: Military History Research Office (MGFA)
- Main interests: Modern European history, military history, historiography
- Notable works: Germany and the Second World War

Bernd Stegemann (1938 – 2014) was a German military and naval historian. He was a long-term researcher at the Military History Research Office (MGFA) and contributor to two volumes of the seminal series Germany and the Second World War from the MGFA.

== Education and career ==
Stegemann received his PhD in 1968 at the Free University Berlin with a dissertation on the German naval policy of 1916–1918, also published as a book; his scientific advisor had been historian Walter Bußmann. Throughout his career at MGFA, Stegemann specialised in the German military and naval history during World War I and World War II.

== Historian of Nazi Germany ==
Stegemann contributed to volumes II Germany's Initial Conquests in Europe and III The Mediterranean, South-East Europe, and North Africa 1939–1942 of Germany and the Second World War. In Volume II, he focused on the German sea power, demonstrating its shortcomings of German air and sea power. Historian Dennis Showalter calls the chapter dedicated to the Battle of Britain "excellent", noting that Stegemann and co-author Klaus A. Maier make a convincing case that the German defeat "rendered the spectacular continental victories of 1940 ultimately sterile". In Volume III, Stegmann analysed the North Africa campaign, bringing into focus "the subtext on the operational risks of waging war on a shoestring".

Historian Gerhard Weinberg considered Stegemann's account of Field Marshal Erwin Rommel's conduct of the desert war to be the best account on the topic (as of 1996). Historian Mark Mazower called Volume III "definitive" and praised it for its "range and intellectual energy". He notes that the authors are widely read on the topics and are familiar with the existing controversies in the field, expertly guiding the reader through them.

== Selected works ==
=== In English ===
- Germany and the Second World War
  - Vol. II: Germany's Initial Conquests in Europe. With Klaus A. Maier, Horst Rohde, Hans Umbreit
  - Vol. III: The Mediterranean, South-East Europe, and North Africa 1939–1942. With Gerhard Schreiber, Detlef Vogel

=== In German ===
- Die deutsche Marinepolitik 1916 bis 1918, Historische Forschungen Heft 4, Berlin: Duncker und Humblot 1970
- Zur Problematik des uneingeschränkten U-Boot-Krieges 1917, in: Marine-Rundschau, Band 65, 1968, Heft 3, S. 157-166
- Der U-Boot-Krieg im Jahre 1918, Marine-Rundschau, Band 65, 1968, Heft 5, S. 333-345
- Hitlers Ziele im ersten Kriegsjahr 1939/40. Ein Beitrag zur Quellenkritik, in: Militärgeschichtliche Mitteilungen (MGM), Band 27, 1980, S. 93
