= Philip Steegman =

British portrait painter (1903–1952)

Philip Steegman (1903–1952) was a portrait painter, sculptor, writer and illustrator.

== Biography ==
Philip Steegman was born in 1903, the son of Edward John Steegmann, a bacteriologist in the Royal Navy. His older brother was John Steegman, a writer on art and architecture.

In 1926 he took the portrait of David Stuart Horner, currently at the Brighton Museum & Art Gallery and in 1931 that of W. Somerset Maugham, currently at the National Portrait Gallery in London. He had his First Exhibition at the Claridge Gallery's in 1932.

In the later 1930s, Steegman travelled in India and from the experience he wrote the book Indian Ink (1940).

Philip Steegman died in 1952, in New Orleans; his wife Elizabeth in 1967.

In 1966, Elizabeth Steegman donated The Chinese Chef (Portrait of Hing) to the New Orleans Jazz Museum, one of her late husband's most valued canvasses. The portrait dated back 1932 and it was painted by Philip Steegman at Aston Rowant, Oxfordshire. The model was the Steegman's houseboy at that time, Hing. In 2012 the portrait, initially estimated between £6,000 and £8,000, was sold at £11,250 (£16,178 in 2025 dollars) at an auction by Christie's.
