= Neuberg =

Neuberg may refer to:

- Neuberg (castle), a castle from the 13th century in Podhradí (Neuberg), Czech Republic
- Neuberg, Hesse, a municipality in the district Main-Kinzig-Kreis, Hesse, Germany
- Neuberg an der Mürz, a municipality in Styria, Austria
- Neuberg im Burgenland, a municipality in Burgenland, Austria
- Carl Neuberg (1877–1956), German biochemist
- Joseph Neuberg, German geometer
- Joseph Neuberg (writer) (1806–1867), German-English writer
- Neuberg formula, a method of fairly adjusting match point scores in contract bridge

== See also ==
- Neuburg (disambiguation)
