= List of castles in the Karlovy Vary Region =

This is a list of castles and chateaux located in the Karlovy Vary Region of the Czech Republic.

== A ==
- Andělská Hora Castle
- Arnoltov Chateau

== B ==
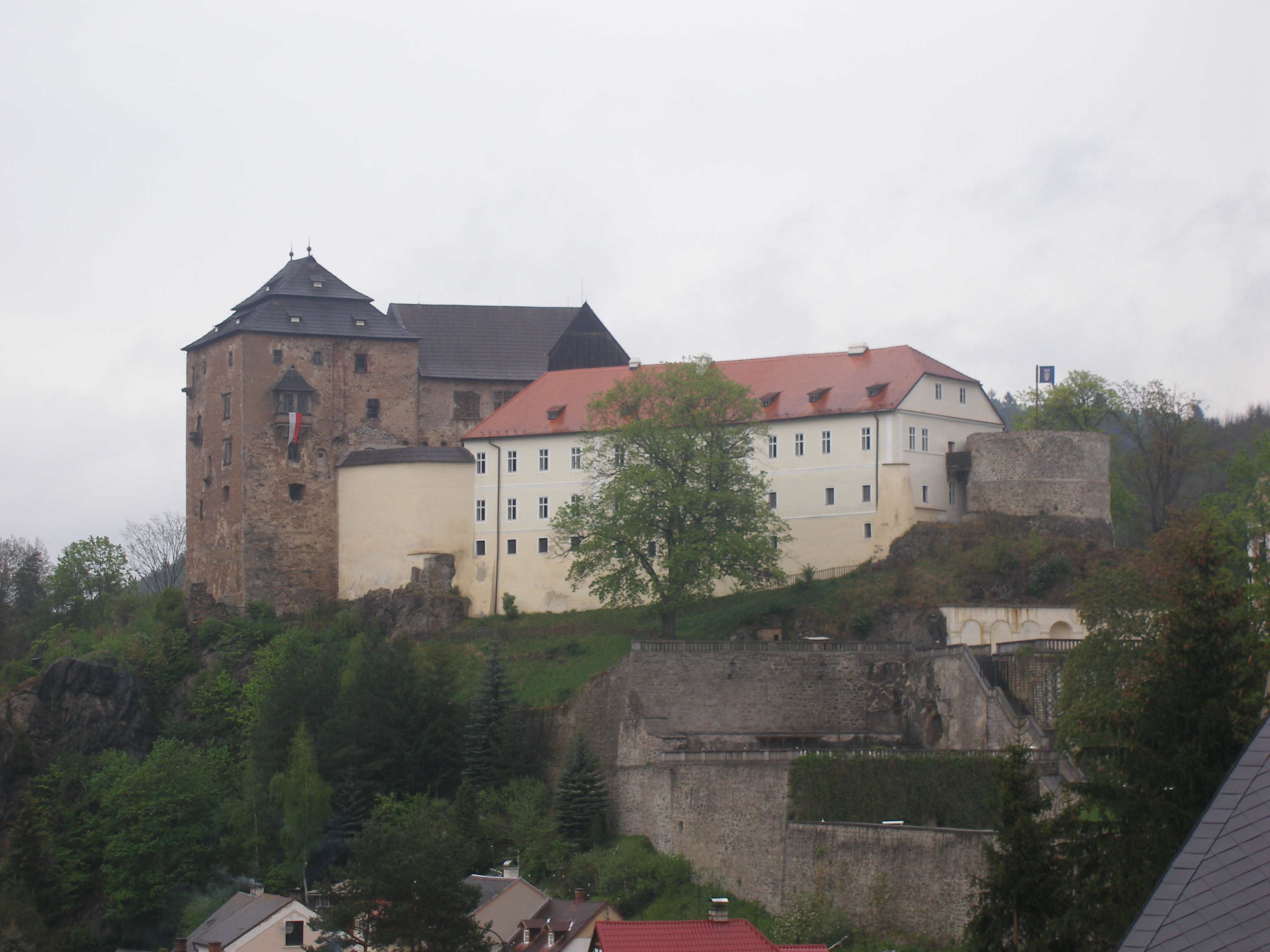
Bečov nad Teplou Castle.

- Bečov nad Teplou Castle
- Bečov nad Teplou Chateau
- Boršengrýn Castle

== C ==
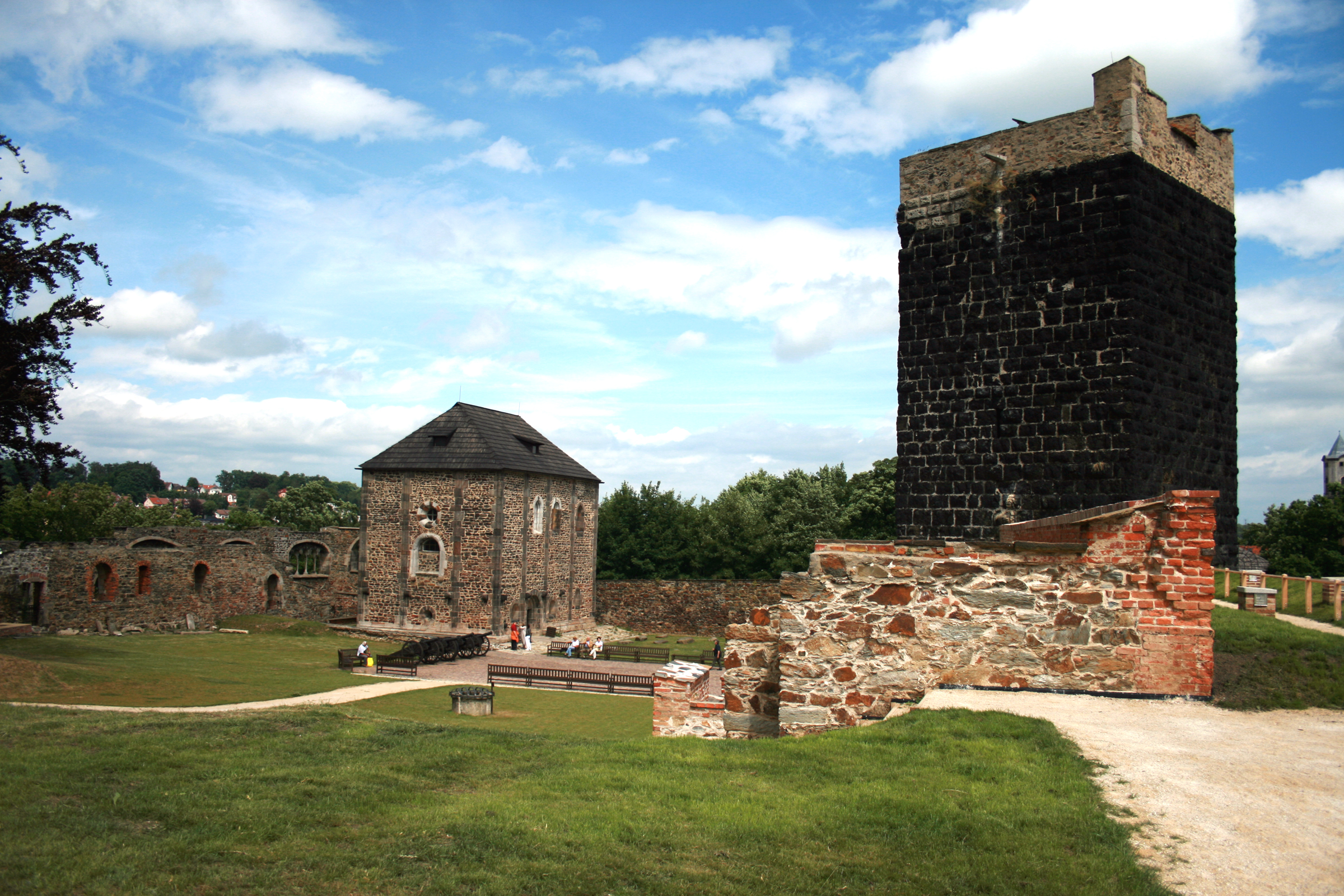
Cheb Castle.

- Cheb Castle
- Chlumek - Nový zámek Chateau
- Chlumek - Starý zámek Chateau
- Chyše Chateau

== D ==
- Dalovice Chateau
- Děpoltovice - nový zámek Chateau
- Doubí Chateau
- Doubrava Chateau

== F ==
- Freudenstein Castle
- Funkštejn Castle

== H ==
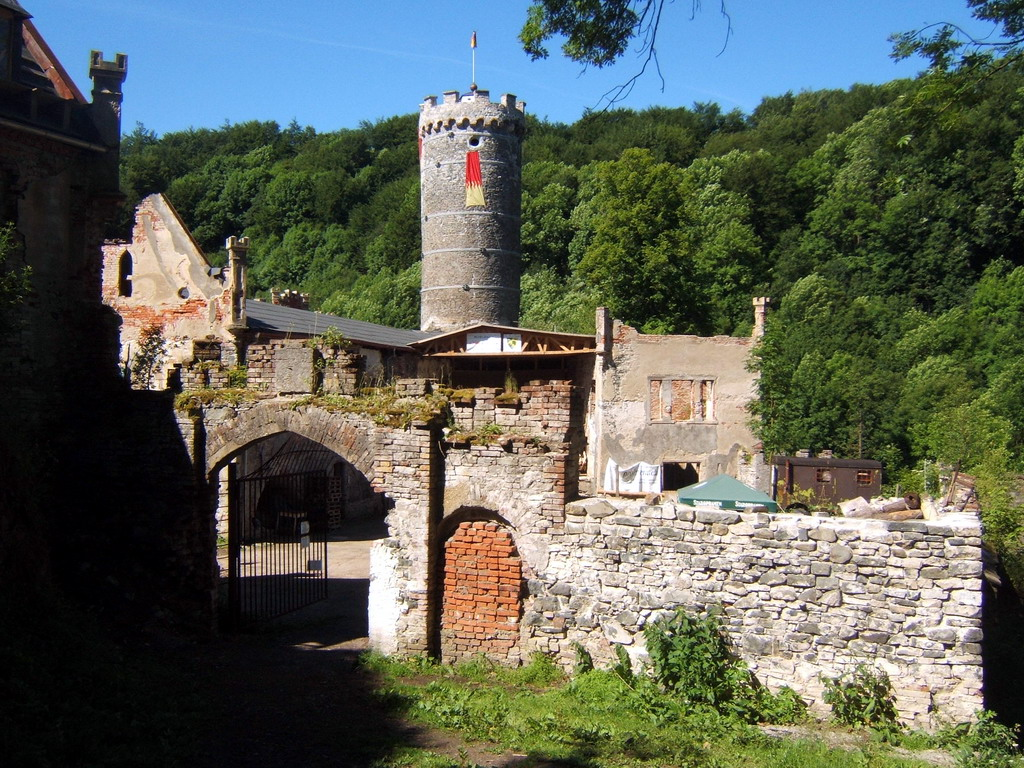
Hauenštejn Castle.

- Hartenberk Chateau
- Hartenštejn Castle
- Hauenštejn Castle
- Hazlov Chateau
- Himlštejn Castle
- Hungerberg Castle

== J ==
- Javorná Chateau
- Jindřichovice Chateau

== K ==
- Kaceřov Chateau
- Kamenný Dvůr Chateau
- Karlovy Vary Castle
- Kladská Chateau
- Kleinštejn Castle
- Kostelní Bříza Chateau
- Kostrčany Chateau
- Kraslice Castle
- Kynžvart Castle
- Kynžvart Chateau

== L ==
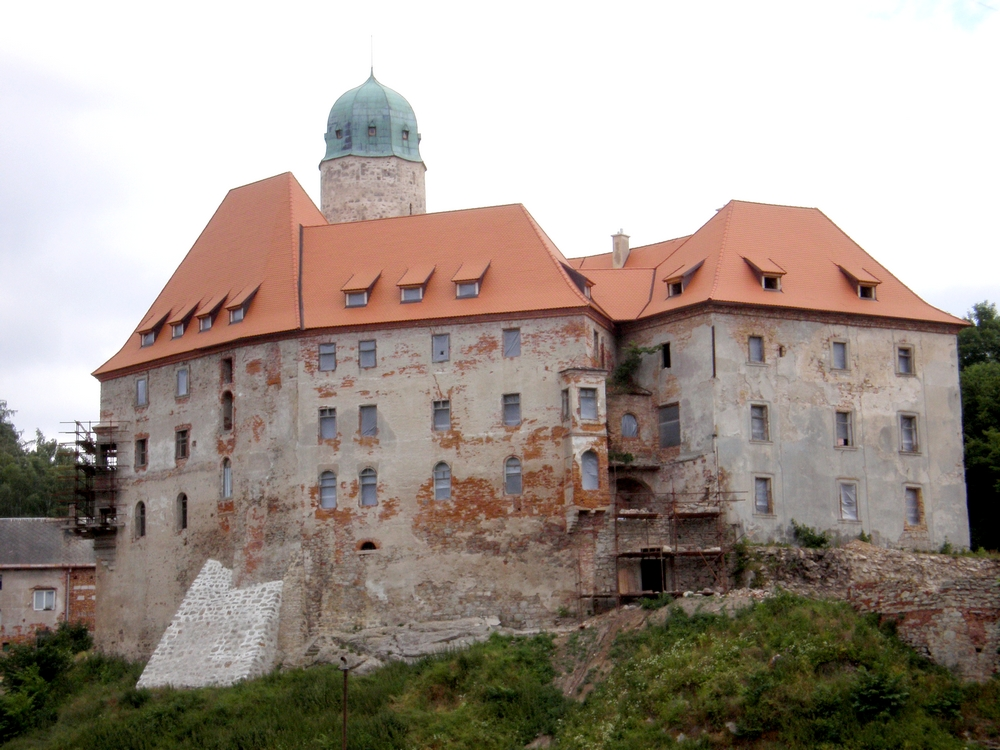
Libá chateau

- Libá Chateau
- Lítov Chateau
- Loket Castle
- Luby u Chebu Chateau
- Luka Chateau

== M ==
- Maleš Castle
- Mořičov Chateau
- Mostov Chateau

== N ==
- Nejdek Castle
- Neuberk Castle
- Neuhaus Castle
- Nevděk Castle

== O ==
- Ostrov Chateau

== P ==
- Podhradí - Dolní zámek Chateau
- Podhradí - Starý (Horní) zámek Chateau

== S ==
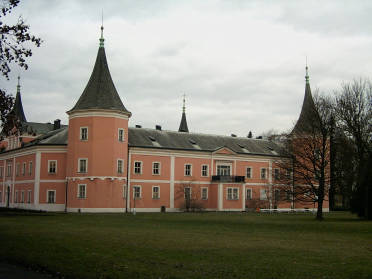
Sokolov Chateau

- Skalka Castle
- Skalná Castle
- Sokolov Chateau
- Starý Hrozňatov Chateau
- Starý Rybník - zámek Chateau
- Starý Rybník Castle
- Stružná Chateau
- Štědrá Chateau
- Štědrý hrádek Castle

== T ==
- Toužim Chateau

== V ==
- Valeč Chateau
- Verušičky Chateau

== See also ==
- List of castles in the Czech Republic
- List of castles in Europe
- List of castles
