= Andělská Hora =

Andělská Hora may refer to places in the Czech Republic:

- Andělská Hora (Bruntál District), a town in the Moravian-Silesian Region
- Andělská Hora (Karlovy Vary District), a municipality and village in the Karlovy Vary Region
  - Andělská Hora Castle above the village
- Andělská Hora, a village and part of Chrastava in the Liberec Region
