= Starý Rybník Castle =

Coordinates: 50°09′41.23″N 12°21′14.84″E

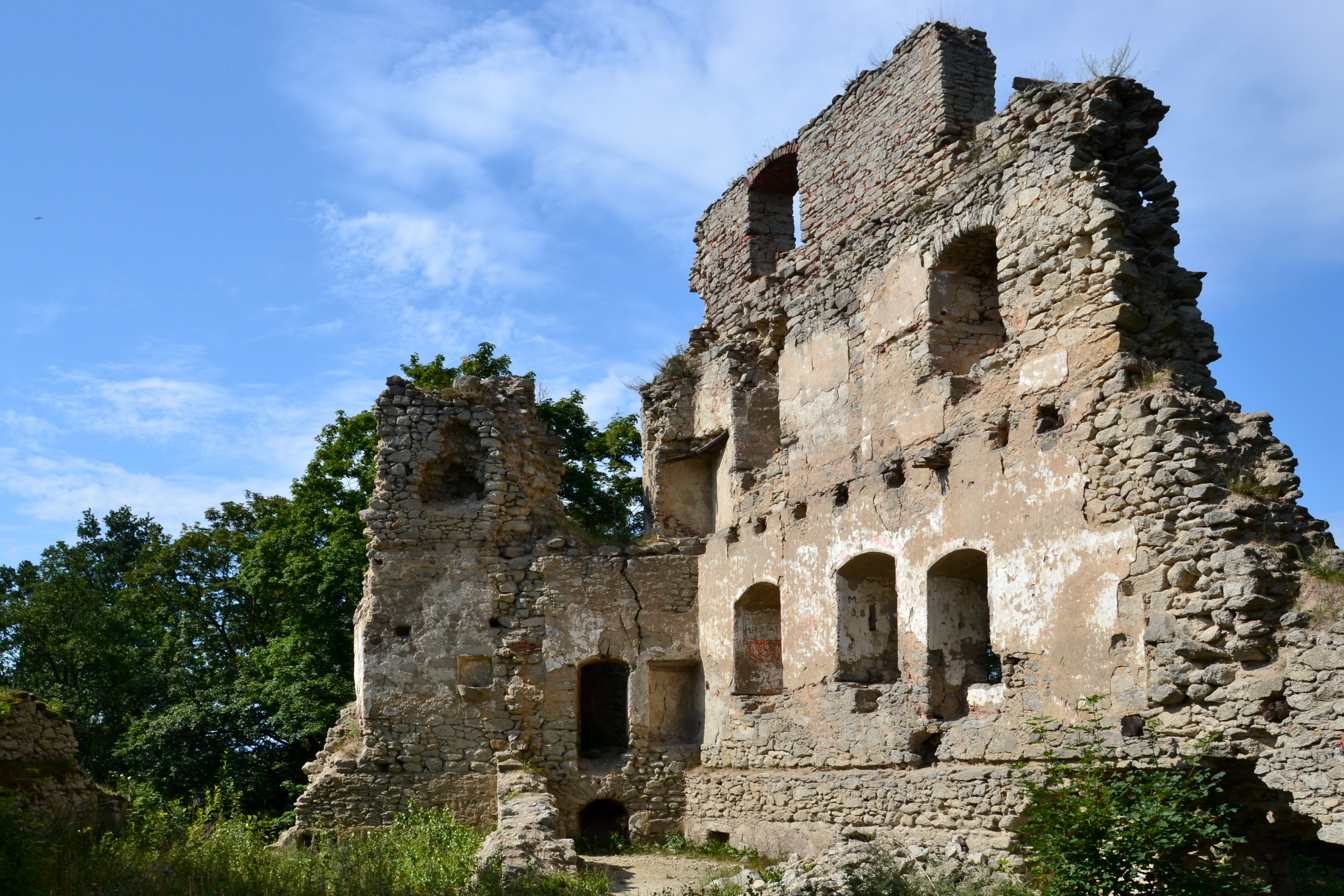
Starý Rybník Castle

Starý Rybník Castle is a castle ruin in the village of Starý Rybník in the Karlovy Vary Region, Czech Republic.

== Location ==
Ruins of Starý Rybník Castle are on a small rocky ridge between two fishponds in the village of Starý Rybník (part of Skalná in Cheb District).

== History ==
The castle was likely constructed during the latter half of the 14th century. Soon afterwards, the castle passed on to the Frankengrüner family from Cheb and was later acquired by the Gumerauers and the Brambachs. Throughout most of the 16th century it belonged to the Lords of Wirsperg. In the following years, it frequently changed hands, from the Trautenbergs to the Hartenbergs and later to the Perglars of Perglas. In 1787, it was acquired by Johann Georg Wilhelm whose family held it up to 1945.

== See also ==
- List of castles in the Karlovy Vary Region
