= Podhradí (Cheb District) =

- Municipality
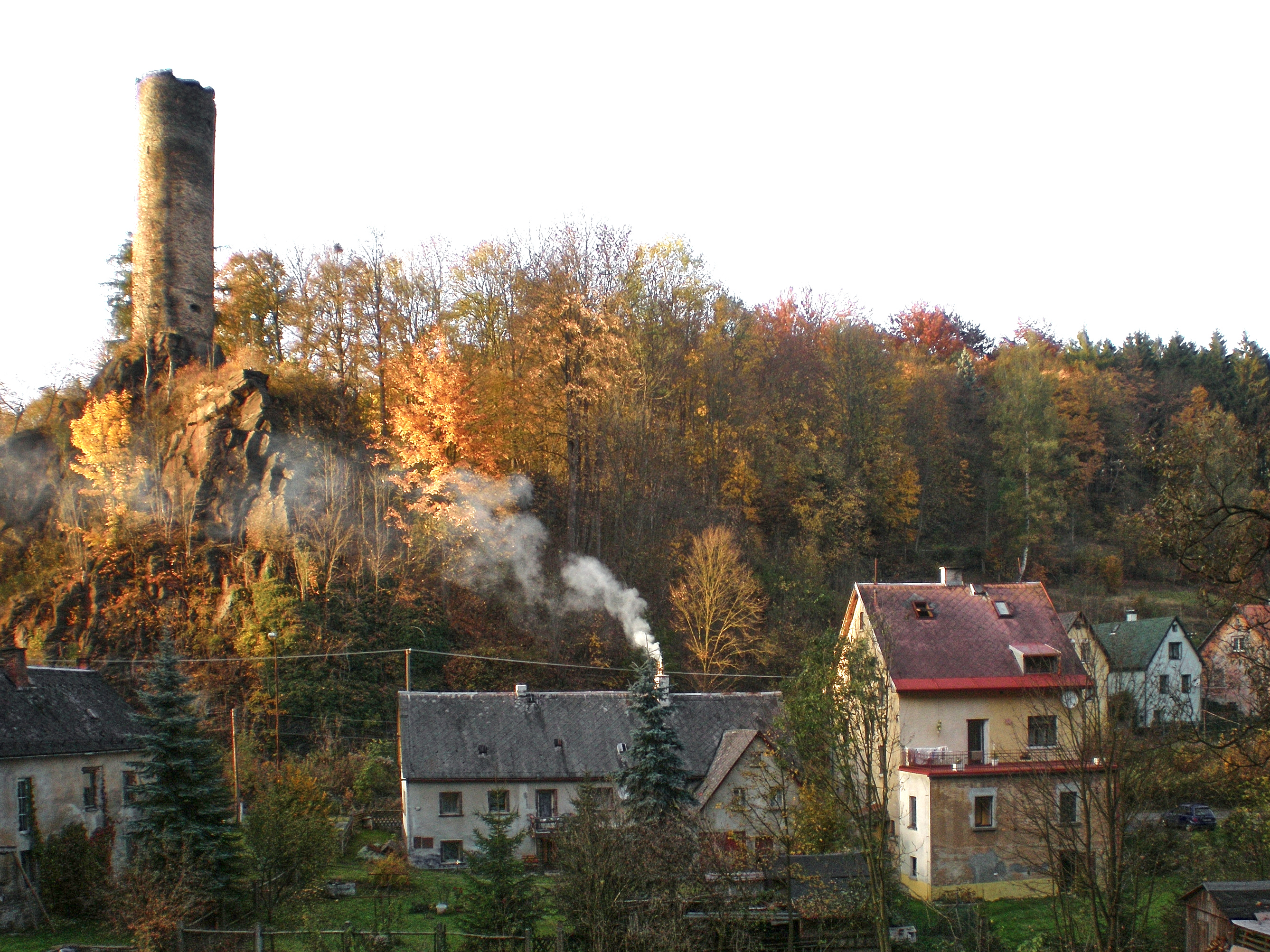
- Podhradí with ruins of Neuberg Castle

- Flag Coat of arms

- Location in the Czech Republic
- Coordinates: 50°15′20″N 12°12′7″E
- Country: Czech Republic
- Region: Karlovy Vary
- District: Cheb
- First mentioned: 1288

Area
  - Total: 6.36 km^{2} (2.46 sq mi)
- Elevation: 562 m (1,844 ft)

Population (2026-01-01)
  - Total: 219
  - Density: 34.4/km^{2} (89.2/sq mi)
- Time zone: UTC+1 (CET)
  - Summer (DST): UTC+2 (CEST)
- Postal code: 352 01
- Website: www.oupodhradi.cz

Podhradí (German: Neuberg) is a municipality and village in Cheb District in the Karlovy Vary Region of the Czech Republic. It has about 200 inhabitants.

== Etymology ==
The German name of the settlement and the local castle was Neidberg, which meant 'furious castle'. In the mid-16th century, the name was distorted to Neuberg ('new castle'). In 1948, the municipality and the village were renamed Podhradí. The name Podhradí (from pod hradem, i. e. 'below the castle') means "area below the castle" in Czech.

== Geography ==
Podhradí is located about 22 kilometres (14 mi) northwest of Cheb and 46 km (29 mi) west of Karlovy Vary, in the Aš Panhandle area. It lies in the Fichtel Mountains. The highest point is the hill Studánecký vrch at 697 m (2,287 ft) above sea level, located on the northern municipal border. The stream Ašský potok flows through the municipality.

== History ==
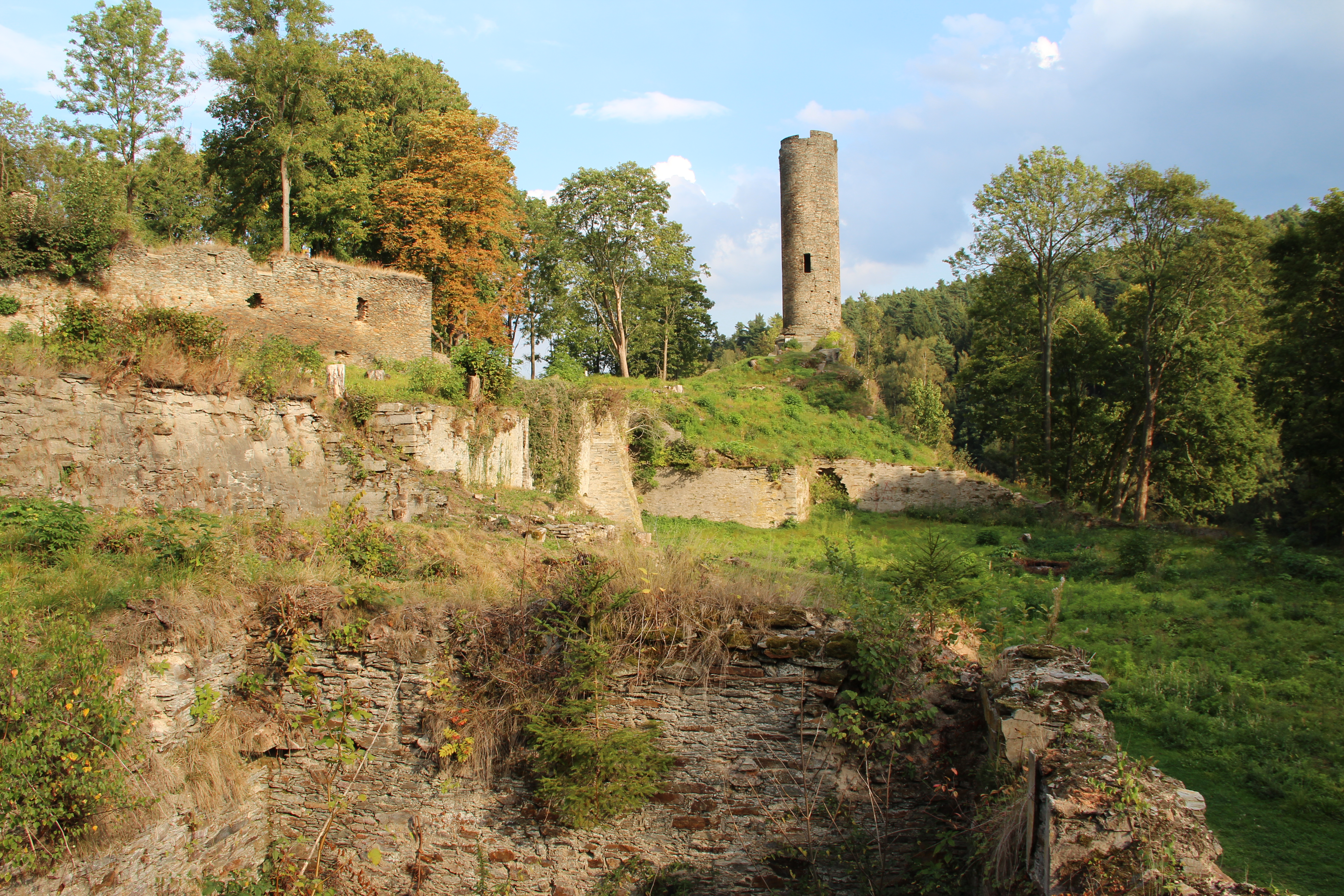
Ruins of Neuberg Castle

The first written mention of Neuberg Castle is from 1288, however, it was built in the first half of the 13th century. Until 1288, it was owned by the Lords of Neuberg, but then King Rudolf I handed it to the Lords of Plauen as a fief. Podhradí soon returned to the possession of the Lords of Neuberg. In 1395, the castle and the village was acquired by the Zedtwitz family, who owned it until 1945.

In the 16th century, the Romanesque castle was abandoned, and after a big fire at the turn of the 16th and 17th centuries, it was severely damaged. The remains of the castle were used for building materials. The castle was replaced by a Renaissance castle, which was damaged during the Thirty Years' War and rebuilt in the late 17th century. In 1902, it was destroyed in a big fire.

After the estate was divided among several branches of the Zedtwitz family, the members of one of them had built a new residence called Horní zámek ('upper castle'), and another residence known as Dolní zámek ('lower castle') was built in the mid-18th century. Horní zámek was demolished in the 1960s and Dolní zámek was completely demolished in 1965.

After World War II, the German-speaking population was expelled and the village significantly depopulated.

== Demographics ==
Historical population

Year	Pop.	±%
1869	1,461	—
1880	1,392	−4.7%
1890	1,466	+5.3%
1900	1,618	+10.4%
1910	1,737	+7.4%

Year	Pop.	±%
1921	2,009	+15.7%
1930	1,360	−32.3%
1950	454	−66.6%
1961	321	−29.3%
1970	257	−19.9%

Year	Pop.	±%
1980	180	−30.0%
1991	138	−23.3%
2001	166	+20.3%
2011	175	+5.4%
2021	195	+11.4%

Source: Censuses

== Transport ==
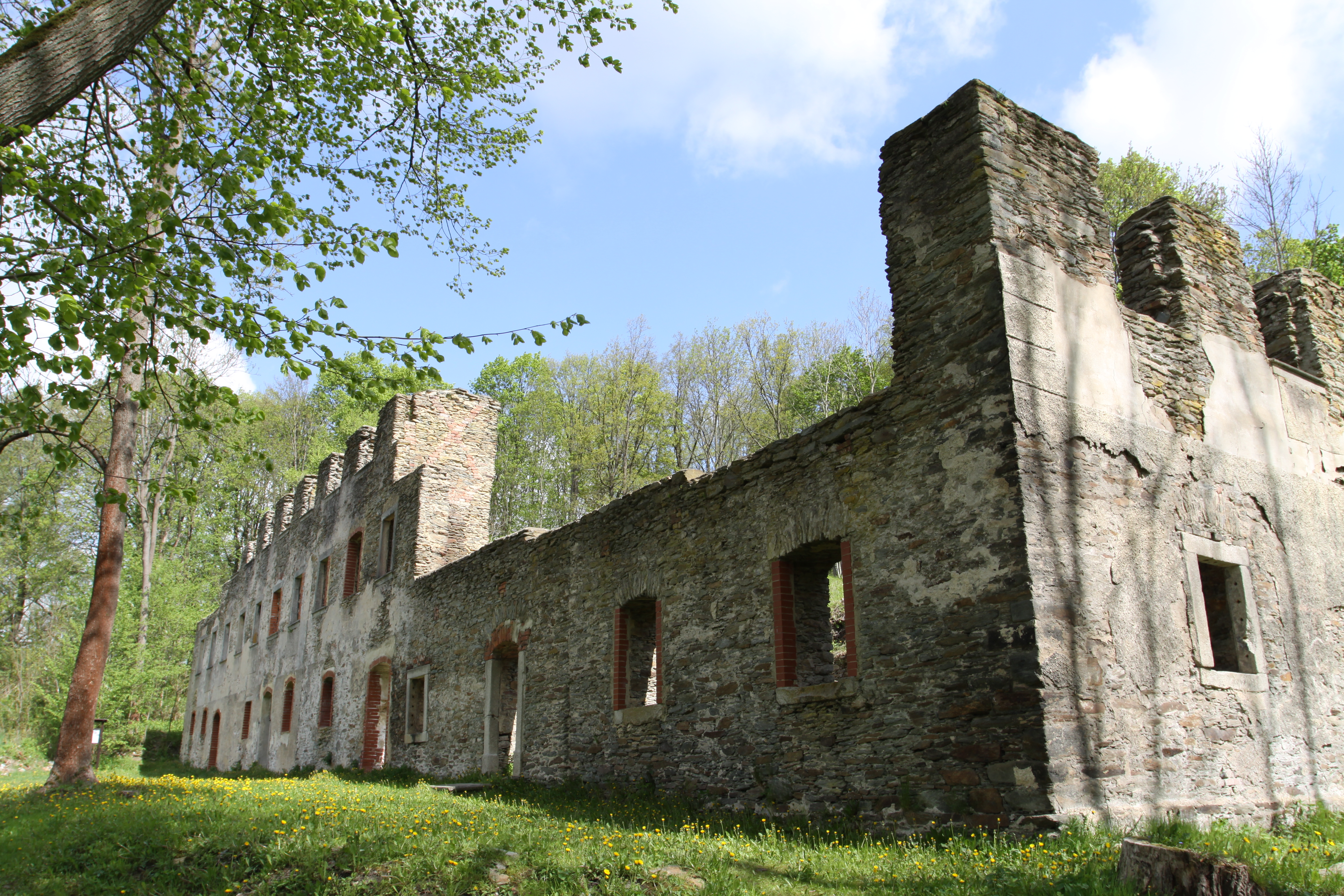
Ruins of Horní zámek

There are no railways or major roads passing through the municipality.

== Sights ==
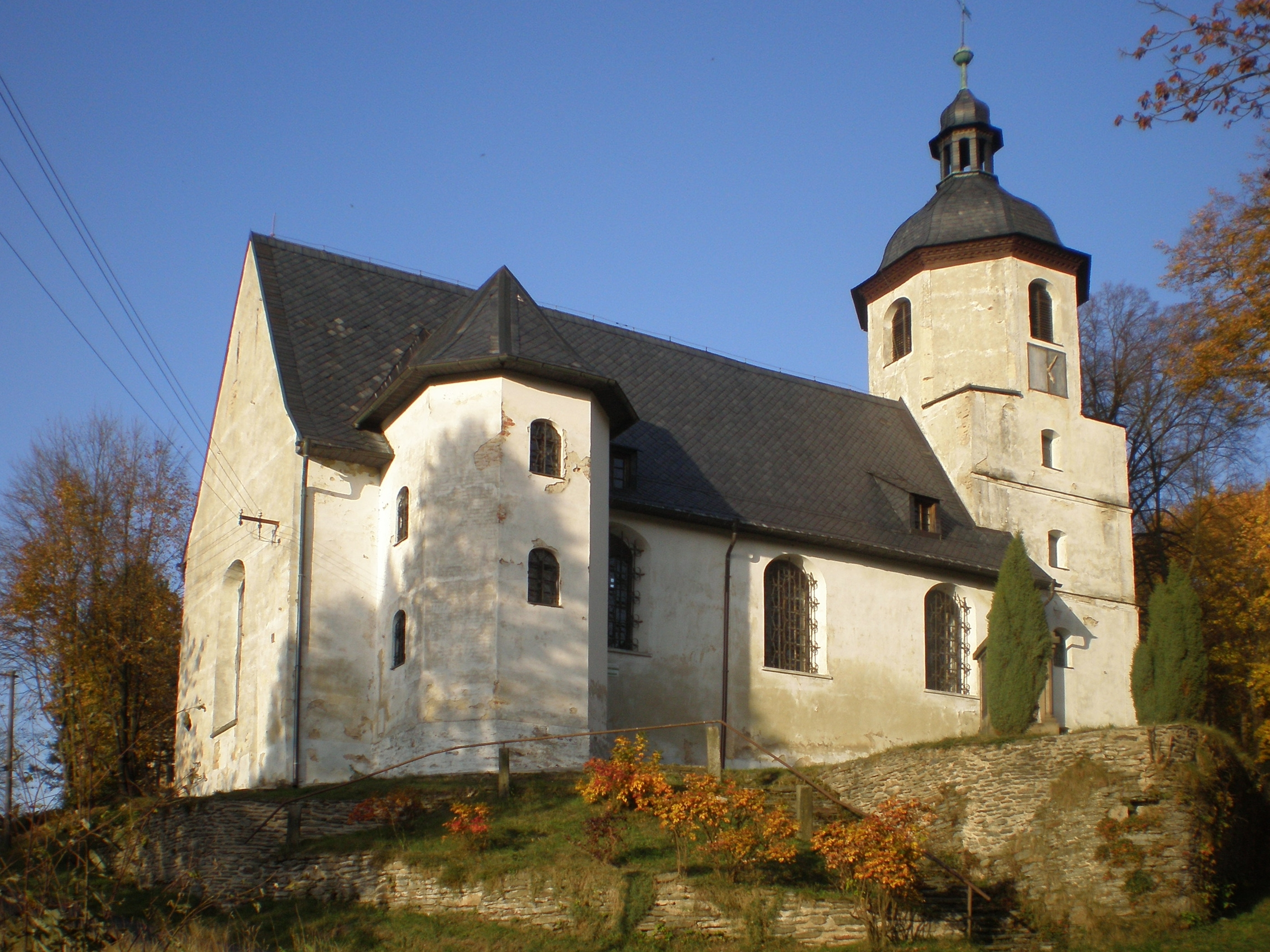
Church of the Good Shepherd

The Church of the Good Shepherd is the oldest Lutheran church in the area. It was built in the late Gothic style by the Zedtwitz family in 1470–1490. In the 1680s, it was rebuilt in the Baroque style. The tower was modified in 1677–1699.

Ruins of Neuberg Castle and Horní zámek are preserved and freely accessible.

== Notable people ==
- Ernestine von Fricken (1816–1844), Austrian pianist
