= Neuberg (castle) =

Coordinates: 50°15′18″N 12°12′24″E

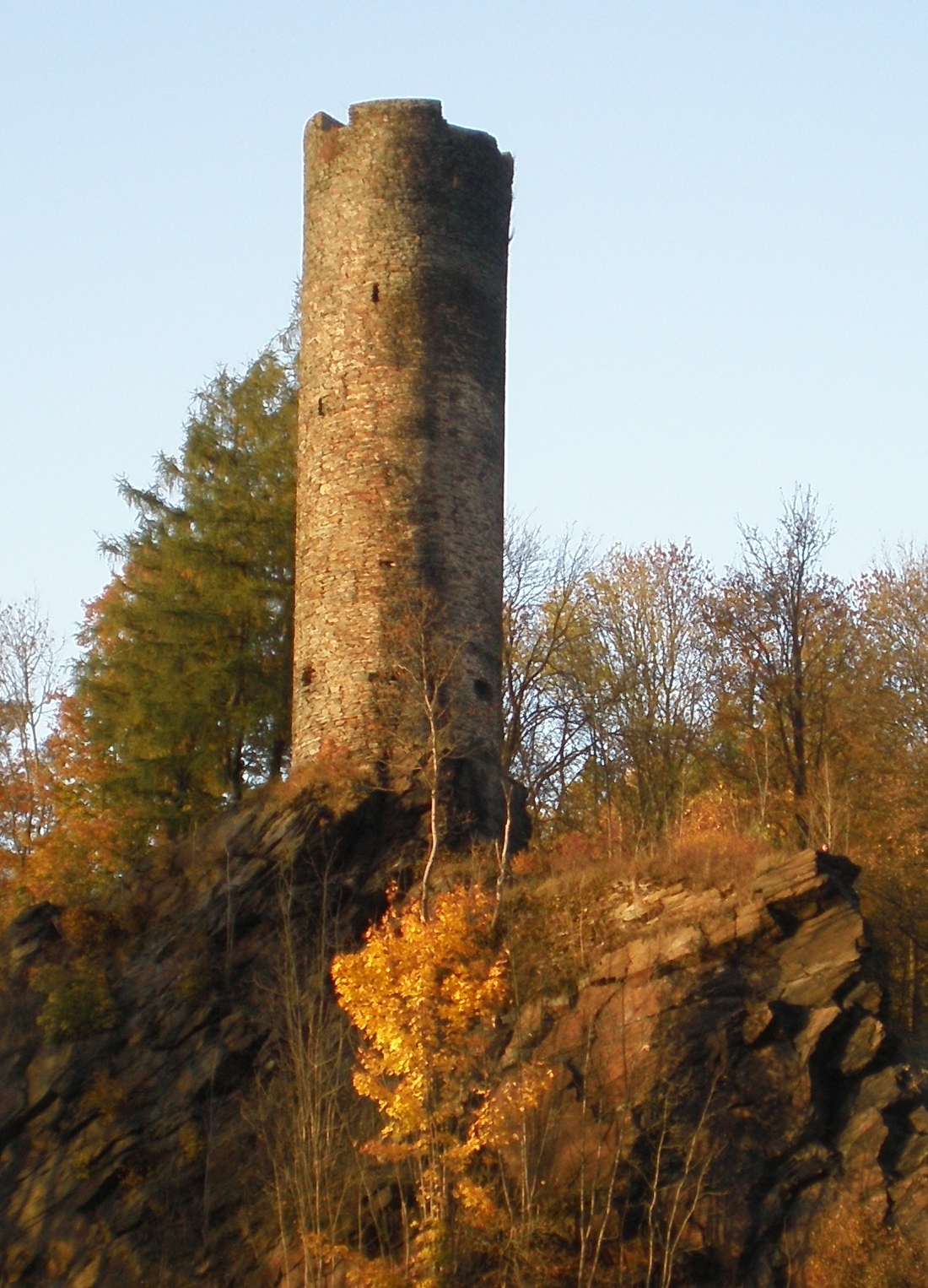
Neuberg Castle

Neuberg Castle is a ruins of castle in Podhradí in Cheb District in the Karlovy Vary Region of the Czech Republic.

== History ==
The castle was built by the Neuberg family probably in late 13th century, and was first mentioned in 1288. In that year, after Albrecht von Neuberg's death, King Rudolph I of Bohemia handed Neuberg and the whole village to the Lords of Plauen as a fief. Later, the castle was damaged by the army of Charles IV. In 1392, the village and the castle were inherited by the Zedtwitz family, and became the centre of the whole Aš region.

After a big fire in 1610, the castle was seriously damaged. The Zedwitz family divided into several branches that moved to new castles in Aš, Kopaniny, Doubrava, Smrčina and two castles in Podhradí. Since then, the castle has been uninhabited.

Nowadays there is only the castle tower, 22 metres (72 ft) high. The local council tries to save it, but due to lack of finances it is a big problem.
