= Joachim von Zedtwitz =

Austrian physician

- Born: 11 June 1910; Vienna, Austria
- Died: 10 October 2001 (aged 91)
- Other name: Count von Zedtwitz
- Occupation: Physician
- Known for: Helping Jews escape during World War II
- Awards: Righteous Among the Nations

Joachim von Zedtwitz (6 June 1910 – 10 October 2001) was a physician who helped Jews escape Nazis during World War II, for which he received the title Righteous Among the Nations on 14 December 1994. To make arrangements to have refugees transported to Poland, he worked with Milena Jesenská, teachers from the British Institute in Prague and local guides at Moravská Ostrava. The refugees travelled to Katowice in Poland where another group of people helped them reach England or France. This route became obsolete when the Germans invaded Poland.

Jesenská was arrested in November 1939 and was sent to Ravensbrück concentration camp, where she died on 17 May 1944. Zedtwitz was arrested and interrogated by the Gestapo in March 1940. He assumed the manner of a mentally ill patient and was put into a psychiatric hospital for 15 months. After his release, he continued to work within the resistance movement until the end of the war. After the war, he settled in Switzerland, where he attained citizenship in 1980. He practiced medicine and pursued creative interests.

== Life ==
Joachim von Zedtwitz was born in the Pötzleinsdorf area of Vienna, Austria on 11 June 1910. He descended from the Zedtwitz family of Germany, who were Bohemian nobility, including Count Philipp Ferdinand (1700–1750). His parents were Count Max von Zedwitz and Eleonora von Janson and he had a brother, Peter, who was born in 1913. Zedtwitz studied medicine in Prague, Czechoslovakia.

== World War II ==
=== 15 March 1939 ===
In March 1939, the Germans took control of Czechoslovakia at great peril to the Jewish people living there. On 15 March, while walking the streets of Prague, Zedtwitz learned of the invasion and ran to the houses of Jewish friends, including that of his friend Neumann's mother, to comfort them and encourage them to leave the area. From this effort, he came to know teachers from England—Bill Henson, Mary Johnston, Kenneth Ogier and Harold Stovin—who taught at the British Institute in Prague and volunteered to help Jewish people leave the city. They were all friends of his friend Neumann.

=== Transport from Prague ===
Zedtwitz worked with the teachers and Milena Jesenská to save Jews. Jesenská offered her apartment as a hiding place for those waiting to start their journey with Zedwitz. The initial part of the journey involved passing through numerous checkpoints staffed by German soldiers. Zedwitz drove Jews to Moravská Ostrava, where they could cross the border into Poland. The Jews were led by local people who knew the area. English people picked them up in Katowice and led the Jews through Poland and to England. Airmen for the Czech air force were brought along this route by Zedtwitz to Katovice and then France, where they would join the French military forces. Some were able to complete the journey but others were caught and turned back. The route ran through lands that the Zedtwitz family had held for centuries.

Jana Černá, Jesenská's daughter, described Zedtwitz as an "ideal underground activist." He spoke perfect German, looked Aryan with blond hair and blue eyes and displayed a swastika sewn into his lapel when he needed to cross borders.

During one trip for Rudolf Keller, Zedtwitz and Keller were delayed because of snow and missed their connection with a local guide at Moravská Ostrava. Zedtwitz concocted a story to distract a German soldier and allow them to pass through the stop.

=== After Germany's occupation of Poland ===
When Germany occupied Poland, Zedtwitz's route was no longer a viable option for leading Jews to their escape. Horrified by the Germans' behavior against the Jews, Zedtwitz surrendered his German citizenship. In November 1939, Jesenská was arrested and her apartment was searched. A letter from Zedtwitz expressed his desire to travel to England. Zedwitz was arrested on 27 March 1940 and was interrogated by the Gestapo, who were concerned with Jesenská and did not seem to know that Zedtwitz had helped Jews. Zedtwitz acted insane and was placed in a psychiatric clinic for 15 months. After he was released, he worked for a time at medical clinics and then went to Berlin, where he worked with a resistance group.

After Jesenská's arrest, she was transported to Ravensbrück concentration camp, a women's camp located in Germany. Jesenská knew that the Gestapo had interrogated Zedtwitz and believed that he had likely been killed. Zedtwitz learned of Jesenská's detention when she was seriously ill. He sent her a package and tried to secure a pardon for her, but she died in the camp of kidney disease on 17 May 1944.

== After the war ==
Zedtwitz lived in Switzerland from 1948, establishing his residence at some point for his family in Götighofen. Zedtwitz corresponded with Max Horkheimer, a member of the Frankfurt School of social research, in January 1971 about the practical need for the state of Israel, writing that "there needed to be a place to which one could go if one could not go anywhere else." He became a citizen of Switzerland in the 1980s and pursued interests in writing, painting and composing music. Zedtwitz died on 10 October 2001. He was buried in the Bernrain area of Kreuzlingen, Switzerland at the Jewish cemetery.

== Recognition ==
Zedtwitz was recognized for his anti-Nazi activities by Yad Vashem and was bestowed the title Righteous Among the Nations on 14 December 1994. Zedtwitz provided information that helped document the request for Righteous Among the Nations status for Jesenská, which was awarded posthumously in 1995.
