= Ernestine von Fricken =

Austrian pianist (1816–1844)

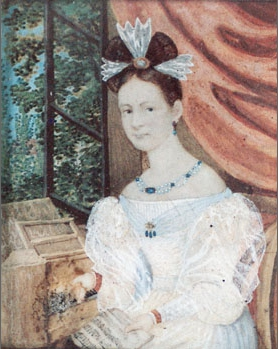
Ernestine von Fricken (about 19 years old)

Christiane Ernestine Franziska von Fricken (7 September 1816 – 13 November 1844) was an Austrian pianist who, for a while, was the fiancée of Robert Schumann.

== Life ==
Ernestine von Fricken was born on 7 September 1816 in Neuberg, Bohemia, Austrian Empire (today Podhradí, Czech Republic). She was the illegitimate daughter of the unmarried Countess Caroline Ernestine Louise von Zedtwitz (1784–1861) with the wire manufacturer Erdmann Lindauer from GrünAsch near Asch. Her mother's sister, Charlotte Christiane Friederike of Zedtwitz, and her later husband, the landowner and k. k. Captain Ferdinand Ignaz Freiherr von Fricken (1787–1850) were childless themselves and adopted Ernestine. Ignaz von Fricken was an amateur composer. She was officially only adopted on 18 December 1834, when Fricken wanted to arrange the family relationship on the occasion of Ernestine's engagement. A corresponding note can be found as a supplement in the baptismal register.

Ernestine von Fricken became known above all for her relationship with Robert Schumann, whom she met through Friedrich Wieck in April 1834. In August 1834 she became secretly engaged to Schumann, and he dedicated his Allegro op. 8 for piano to her. Notwithstanding their eventual dedication, to William Sterndale Bennett, Schumann's Symphonic Études Op. 13 are based on a theme by Ignaz von Fricken. In addition, his Carnaval op. 9 is a lasting memory of Ernestine von Fricken. In it he symbolizes her hometown Asch by the tone sequence A - Es(S)- C - H. In January 1836 Schumann broke off the engagement. Records survive of correspondence between the Schumanns and Ernestine and her father, Ignaz, spanning the period from 1834 to 1844.

From the summer of 1836 she lived at Buldern Castle near Dülmen (Westphalia) with the family of Baron Klemen von Romberg. From 4 to 6 August 1837, she stayed in Leipzig and met Robert Schumann for the last time, also with Clara Wieck.

On 5 November 1838, she married the 24-year-old Count Wilhelm von Zedtwitz, lord of Asch-Schönbach, a son of Count Casimir Liebmann von Zedtwitz (1770–1822), in the Catholic Niklas Church in Asch. In the register she is not called Ernestine von Fricken, but after her biological mother as "Fräulein Ernestine Christiane Franziska Zedtwitz gebürtig zu Neuberg N. 28. Herrschaft Asch, Tochter der Fräulein Marianne Karoline Ernestine Louise Edlen von Zedtwitz aus Obertheil-Neuberg." The count died on 3 July 1839.

In 1841, Schumann dedicated three songs op. 31 after texts by Adelbert von Chamisso to 'Frau Gräfin Ernestine von Zedtwitz'.

In the later years of her relatively brief life, Ernestine performed benefit concerts. She was a capable pianist, and her repertoire included works by Chopin, Liszt, Schubert, Kalkbrenner and Hummel, performing under both the names Ernestine von Fricken and Countess von Zedtwitz. Ernestine von Fricken died, at the age of 28, on 13 November 1844 of typhoid fever, in Asch.
