= Joseph Neuberg (writer) =

19th century English writer and translator

- Born: 21 May 1806; Würzburg, Bavaria
- Died: 23 March 1867 (aged 60); London, United Kingdom
- Education: University of Bonn
- Occupations: Translator, writer

Joseph Neuberg (21 May 1806 – 23 March 1867) was Bavarian-born English writer and translator, who acted as secretary to Thomas Carlyle.

== Biography ==
Joseph Neuberg was born to a Jewish family in Würzburg, Bavaria, in 1806.

He began his career at a mercantile firm in Hamburg, and later took on a position of responsibility in Nottingham. Neuberg was interested in the well-being of the working class, and served as the president of the People's College and the literary department of the Nottingham Mechanics' Institution.

He was naturalized as an English citizen on June 16, 1845, and studied at the University of Bonn from 1850 to 1853.

Neuberg was introduced to Thomas Carlyle by Ralph Waldo Emerson in 1848, and began working as Carlyle's voluntary secretary in 1849. In 1852, he accompanied Carlyle on a trip to the battlefields of Frederick the Great.

Neuberg returned to England in 1853 to resume his work as Carlyle's secretary.

In 1865, Carlyle published the last volumes of his biography of Frederick the Great, one of which was dedicated to Neuberg, who had assisted with the work. Neuberg also translated Carlyle's On Heroes and Hero-Worship into German in 1853, and began working on a translation of Carlyle's biography of Frederick the Great. However, he died before he could complete the translation.
