= Andělská Hora Castle =

Coordinates: 50°12′23″N 12°57′51″E

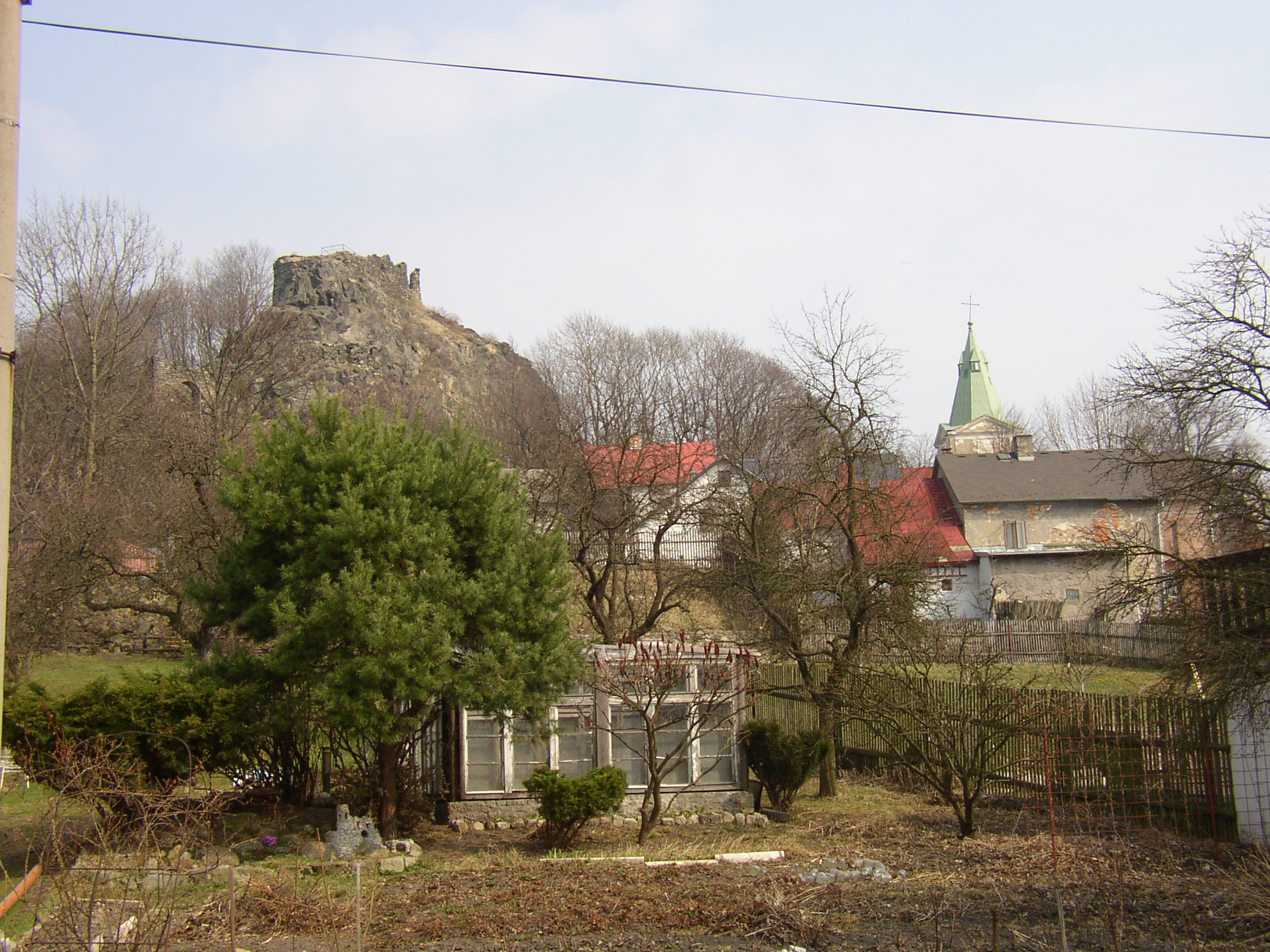
Castle ruin (left) and village of Andělská Hora near Karlovy Vary, Czech Republic

Andělská Hora, also called Engelsburg in the Germanic form of the name, is a castle above the village of Andělská Hora, about 7 kilometres (4 mi) southeast of Karlovy Vary, in the Karlovy Vary Region of the Czech Republic. The translation of "Andělská Hora" and "Engelsburg" is "Angel's Mountain."

The ruins of Andělská Hora Castle stands upon a rock overlooking the village of Andělská Hora which lies just below. It was founded at the turn of the 14th to the 15th century by Boreš z Rýznburk, a noblemen from the Rýznburk family, as protection for their estates. The castle was destroyed by fire during the Thirty Years' War and abandoned in the 17th century.

== See also ==
- List of castles in the Karlovy Vary Region
