= Andělská Hora (Karlovy Vary District) =

- Municipality
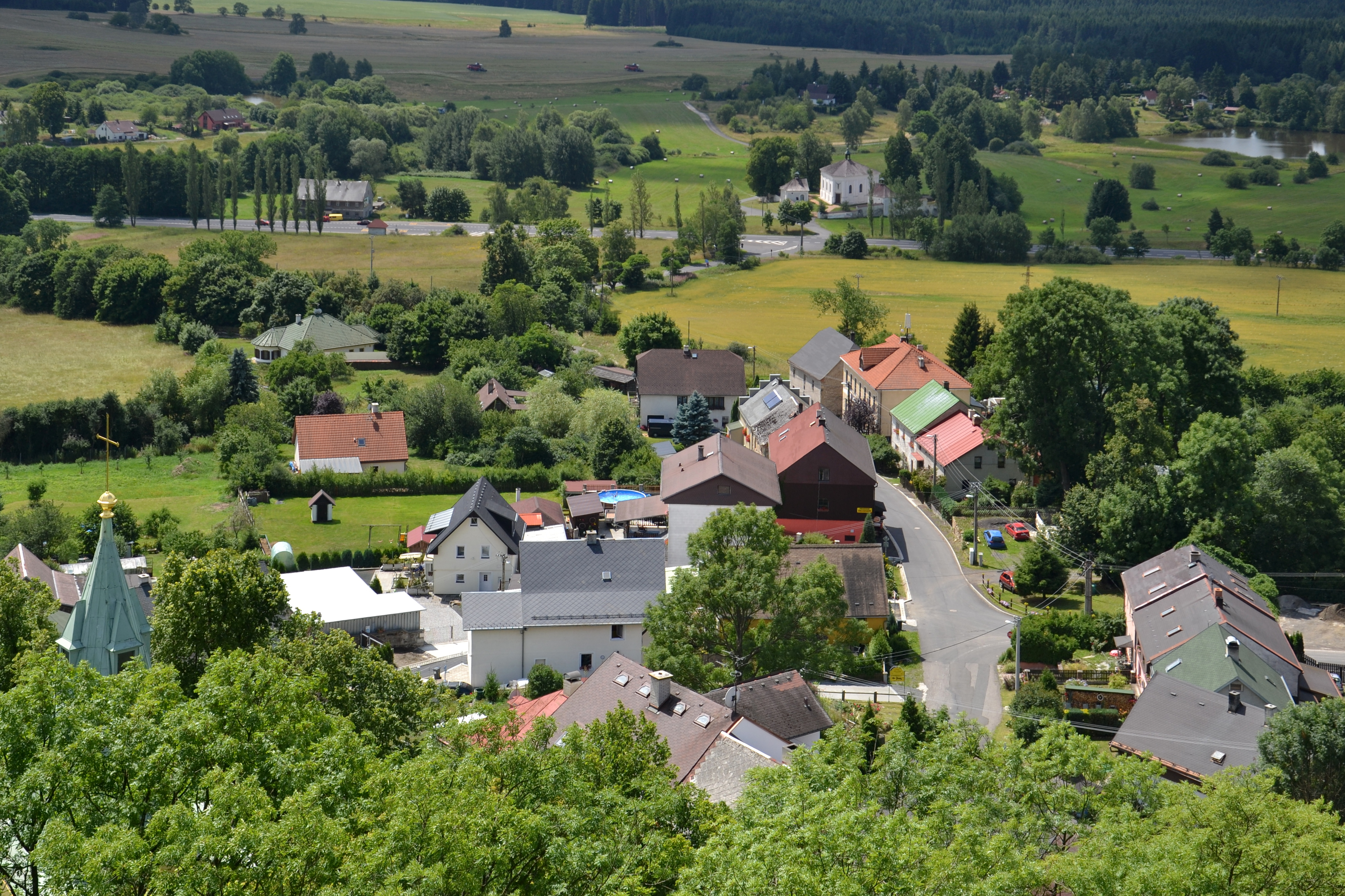
- Andělská Hora seen from the castle

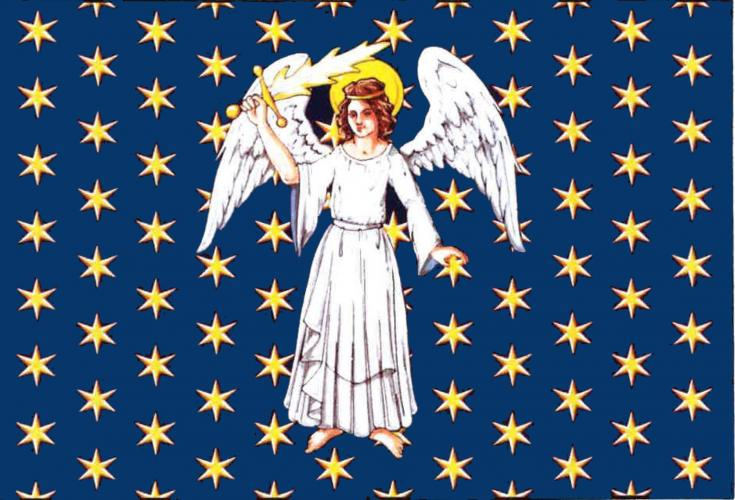
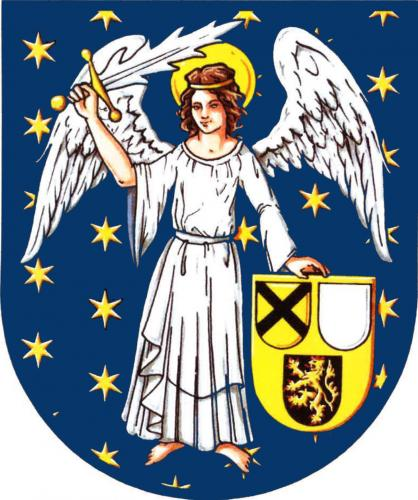
- Flag Coat of arms

- Location in the Czech Republic
- Coordinates: 50°12′16″N 12°57′46″E
- Country: Czech Republic
- Region: Karlovy Vary
- District: Karlovy Vary
- Founded: 1488

Area
  - Total: 8.08 km^{2} (3.12 sq mi)
- Elevation: 665 m (2,182 ft)

Population (2026-01-01)
  - Total: 408
  - Density: 50.5/km^{2} (131/sq mi)
- Time zone: UTC+1 (CET)
  - Summer (DST): UTC+2 (CEST)
- Postal code: 364 71
- Website: www.andelskahora.cz

Andělská Hora (German: Engelhaus) is a municipality and village in Karlovy Vary District in the Karlovy Vary Region of the Czech Republic. It has about 400 inhabitants.

== Etymology ==
The original German name means "angel's castle" and the Czech name means "angel's mountain". The name refers to the castle on a hill above the settlement, which was founded together with the settlement by the Lords of Plauen, who have an angel in their coat of arms.

== Geography ==
Andělská Hora is located about 7 kilometres (4 mi) southeast of Karlovy Vary. It lies in the Slavkov Forest. The highest point is the hill Andělská hora at 713 m (2,339 ft) above sea level. The municipality is rich in small brooks and fishponds.

== History ==
The first written mention of the Andělská Hora Castle is from 1402. It was probably founded shortly before this year. The settlement below the castle was founded in 1488 by Henry III of Plauen.

== Demographics ==
Historical population

| Year | Pop. | ±% |
|---|---|---|
| 1869 | 1,002 | — |
| 1880 | 935 | −6.7% |
| 1890 | 974 | +4.2% |
| 1900 | 953 | −2.2% |
| 1910 | 901 | −5.5% |

| Year | Pop. | ±% |
|---|---|---|
| 1921 | 777 | −13.8% |
| 1930 | 792 | +1.9% |
| 1950 | 221 | −72.1% |
| 1961 | 287 | +29.9% |
| 1970 | 229 | −20.2% |

| Year | Pop. | ±% |
|---|---|---|
| 1980 | 215 | −6.1% |
| 1991 | 165 | −23.3% |
| 2001 | 191 | +15.8% |
| 2011 | 294 | +53.9% |
| 2021 | 390 | +32.7% |

Source: Censuses

== Transport ==
The I/6 road (part of the European route E48), which replaces the incomplete section of the D6 motorway from Prague to Karlovy Vary, runs through the municipality.

== Sights ==
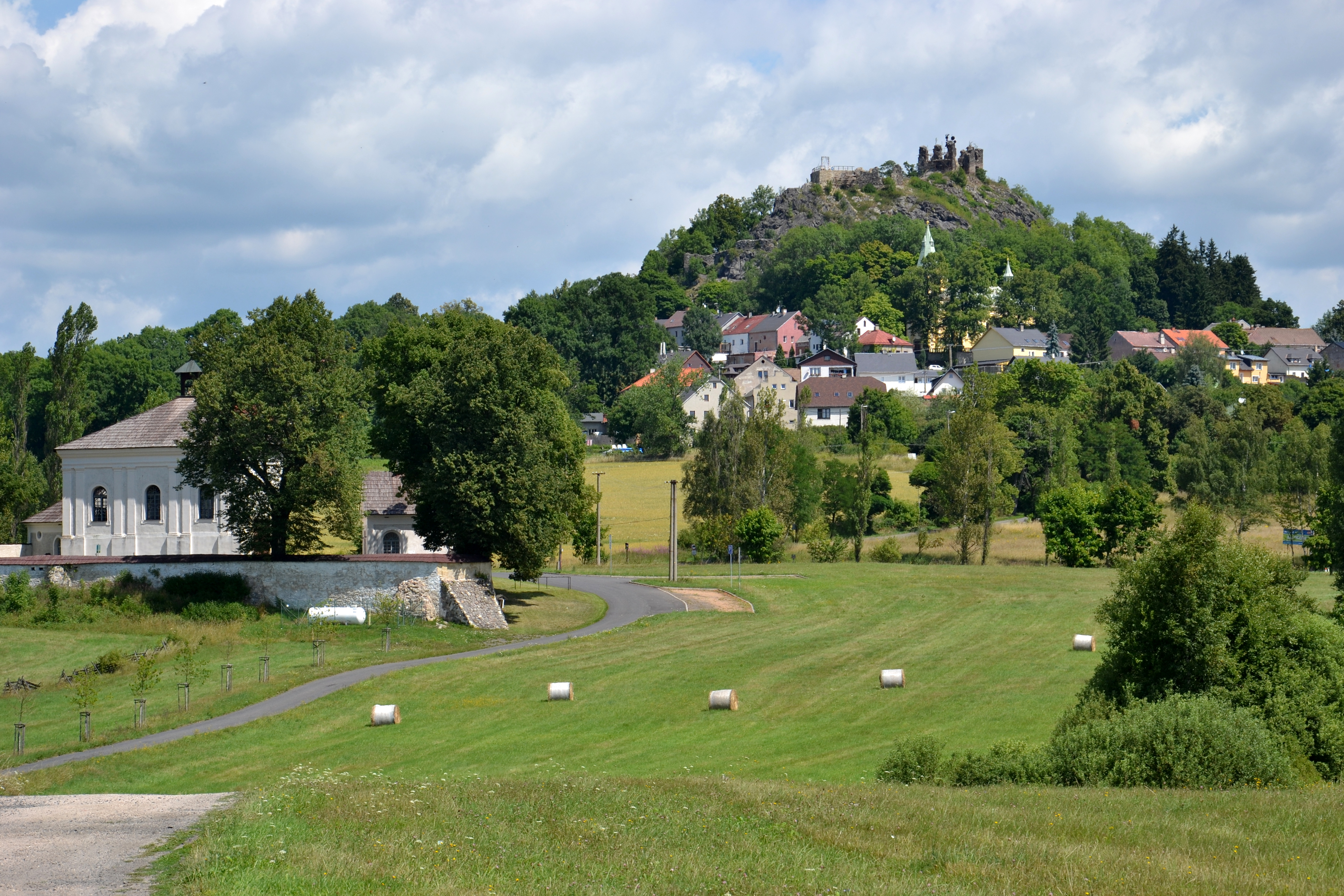
View towards the Andělská Hora Castle

Ruins of the Andělská Hora Castle is the main landmark of the landscape. The castle was destroyed by fire in 1718 and then never restored.

The Church of Saint Michael the Archangel was built in the late Gothic style in 1487–1490. After the fire in 1718, it was reconstructed in the Baroque style.

The Church of the Holy Trinity was built in the early Baroque style in 1698–1712 according to the design by Giovanni Battista Alliprandi. It was originally a pilgrimage church, later turned into a cemetery church.

== Notable people ==
- Henry V, Burgrave of Plauen (1533–1568), nobleman
