= Freudenstein =

Freudenstein is a surname. Notable people with the surname include:

- Astrid Freudenstein (born 1973), German politician
- Ferdinand Freudenstein (1926–2006), physicist
- George Freudenstein (1921–2007), politician
- Nikolai Freudenstein, alias Yuri Felsen (1894–1943), writer

== See also ==
- Freudenstein Castle
- Stahlbahnwerke Freudenstein
