= Doubrava (Aš) =

- Village
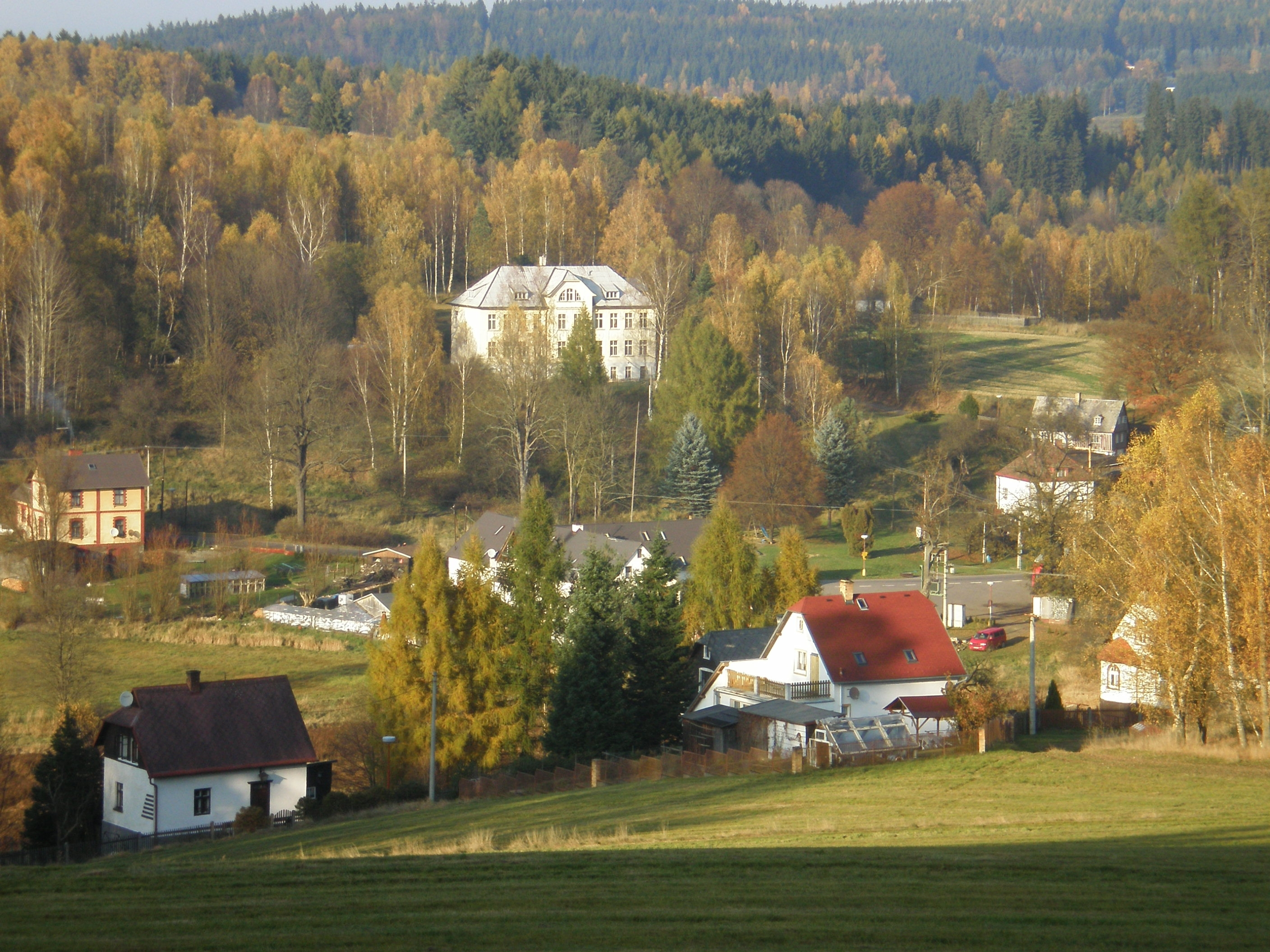
- General view

- Location in the Czech Republic
- Coordinates: 50°15′38″N 12°14′22″E
- Country: Czech Republic
- Region: Karlovy Vary
- District: Cheb
- Municipality: Aš
- First mentioned: 1392

Area
  - Total: 3.83 km^{2} (1.48 sq mi)
- Elevation: 507 m (1,663 ft)

Population (2021)
  - Total: 83
  - Density: 22/km^{2} (56/sq mi)
- Time zone: UTC+1 (CET)
  - Summer (DST): UTC+2 (CEST)
- Postal code: 352 01

Doubrava (German: Grün) is a village and municipal part of Aš in Cheb District in the Karlovy Vary Region of the Czech Republic. It has about 80 inhabitants.

In the village there are a mineral spring.

== Geography ==
Doubrava lies 6 kilometres northeast from Aš, about 507 meters above sea level. It is surrounded by forests. Through Doubrava flows the White Elster River.

== History ==
Doubrava is first mentioned in 1392, as a property of Conrad von Neuberg. At the turn of the 14th and 15th centuries, Doubrava was bought by the Zedtwitz family.

Mineral springs in Doubrava has very similar composition like those in neighbouring German town of Bad Elster. But they are not used for medical purposes yet. Town of Aš plans change in future and revitalise this village.

== Demographics ==
Historical population

Year	Pop.	±%
1869	845	—
1880	819	−3.1%
1890	845	+3.2%
1900	985	+16.6%
1910	992	+0.7%
1921	895	−9.8%
1930	808	−9.7%
1950	257	−68.2%

Year	Pop.	±%
1961	180	−30.0%
1970	141	−21.7%
1980	133	−5.7%
1991	89	−33.1%
2001	94	+5.6%
2011	119	+26.6%
2021	83	−30.3%

Source: Censuses

== Sights ==
- Doubrava Castle from 17th century
- Tomb of Zedtwitz
- Wooden cemetery morgue

== Gallery ==
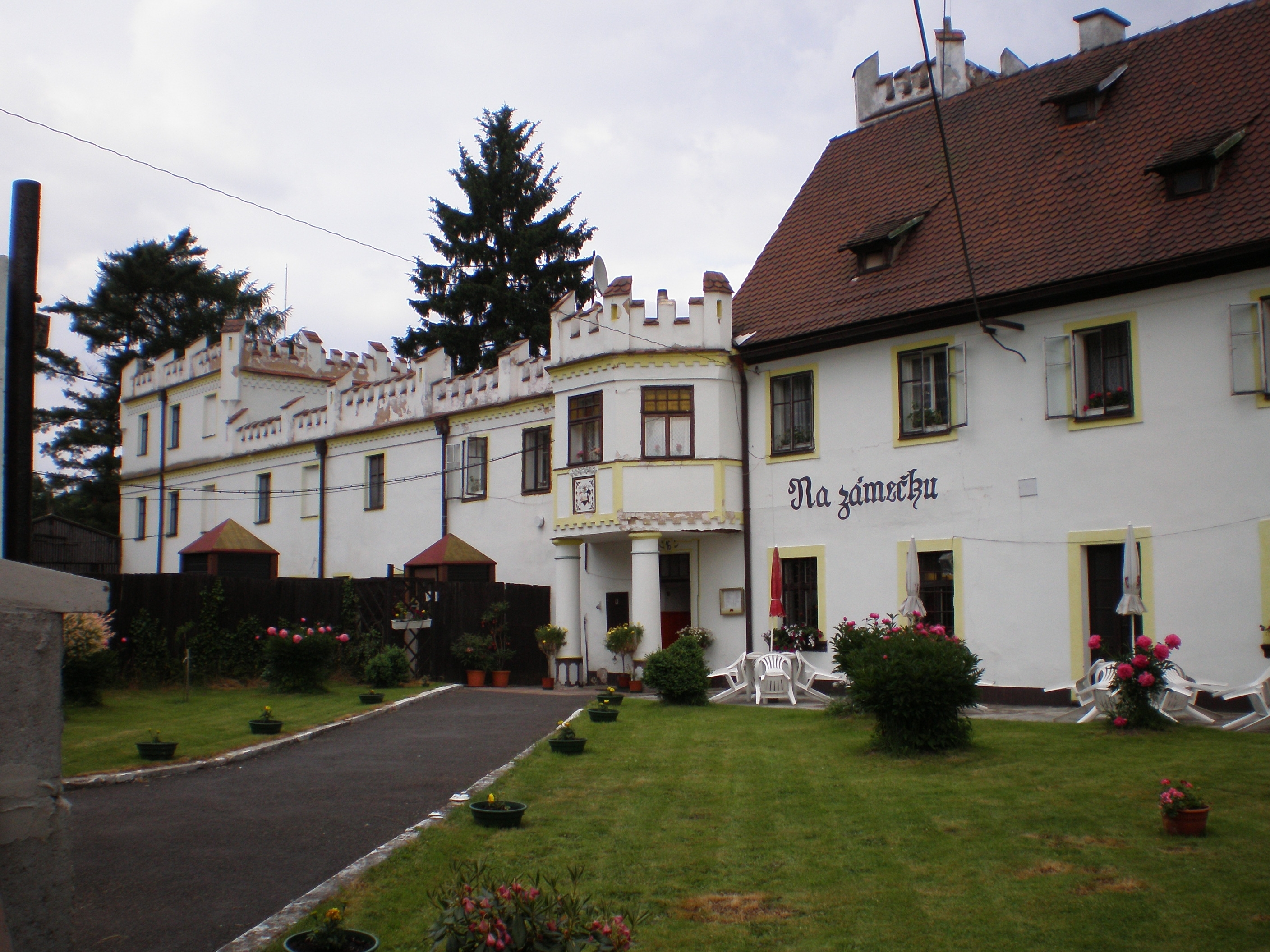
Doubrava Castle

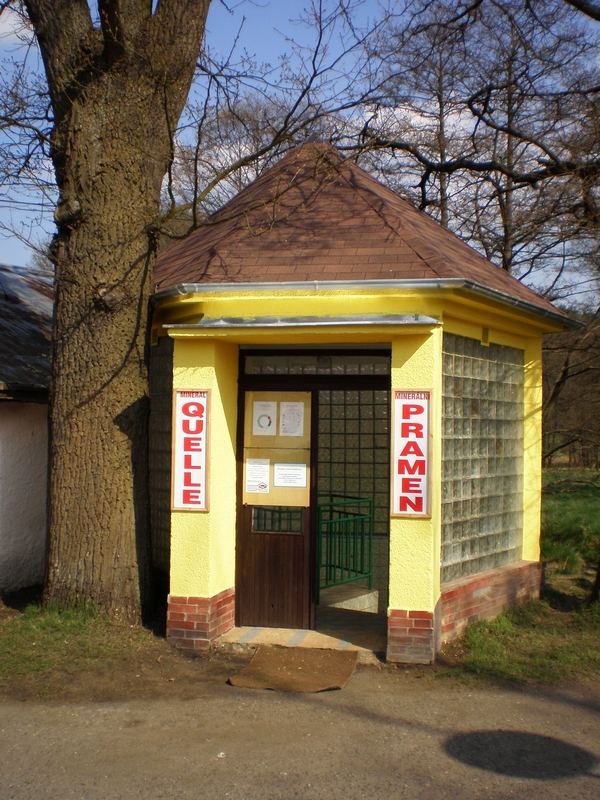
Pavilion od mineral well
