= Zedtwitz family =

Noble family

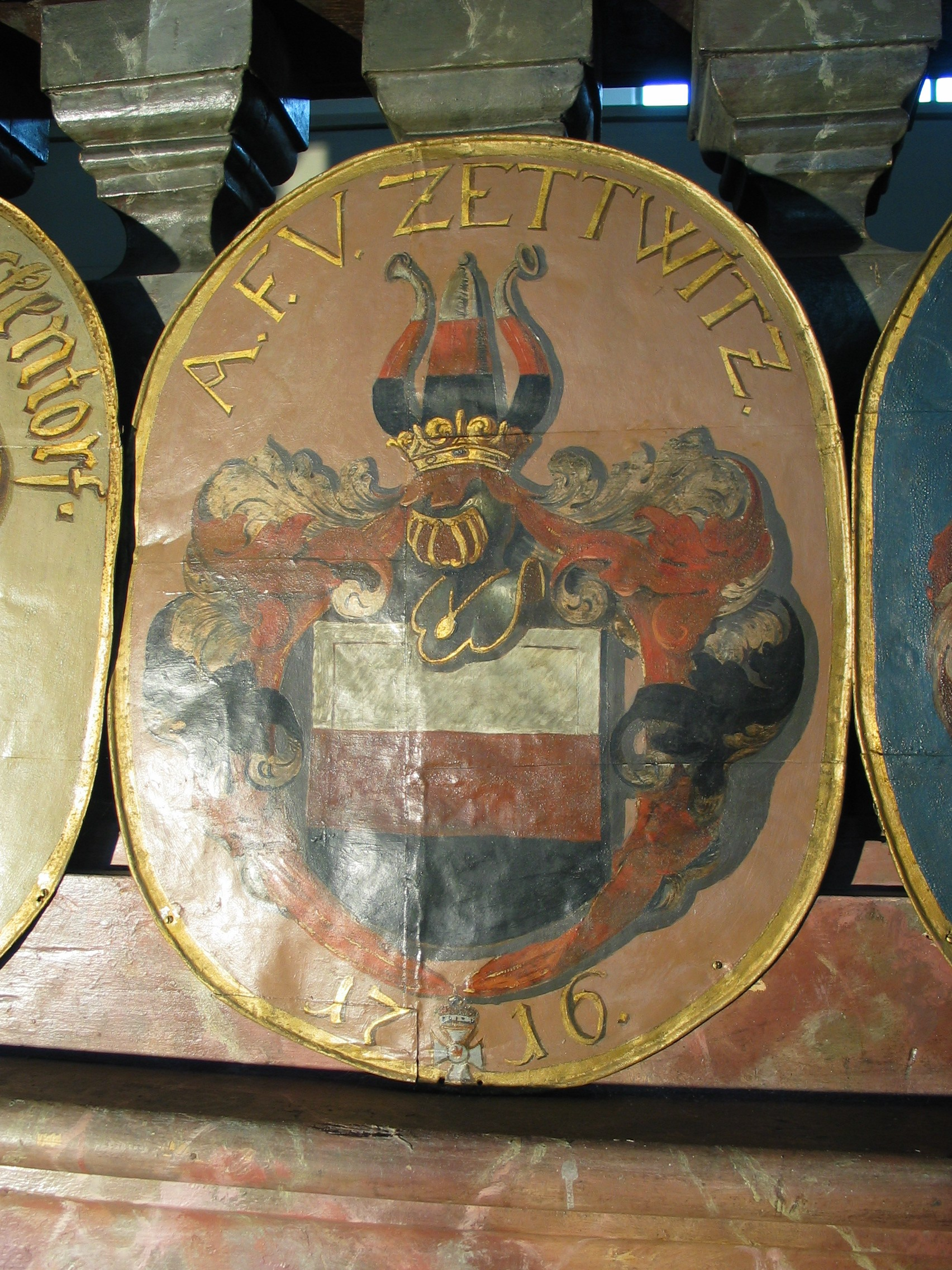
Coat of arms of Zedwitz family

The Zedtwitz family is an old German noble family, which also belonged to the Bohemian nobility. The family originated in Franconia, Germany.

== History ==
The family first appeared in a written document in 1235 and later in 1288 where progenitor Berthold von Zedwitz is mentioned. Between c. 1400 and c. 1945 it ruled the region around the town of Aš. The family had several lines, one of which was Baronial and the other branch received the title of Imperial Count in 1766, as well as Count in Bavaria on 25 August 1790 by Charles Theodore, Elector of Bavaria.

== Notable members ==
- Curt Franz Wenzel Christoph Erdmann Zedtwitz, Graf von Moraván und Duppau (1822–1909), Austro-Hungarian-Bohemian soldier and nobleman
- Peter Emanuel Freiherr von Zedtwitz(-Liebenstein) (1715–1786) (de)
- Joachim von Zedtwitz (1910–2001), who was awarded the title Righteous Among the Nations for his efforts to help Jewish people escape during The Holocaust.
- Moritz Curt von Zedtwitz (1851–1896), a German diplomat
- Waldemar von Zedtwitz (1896–1984), German-American bridge player

== Properties ==
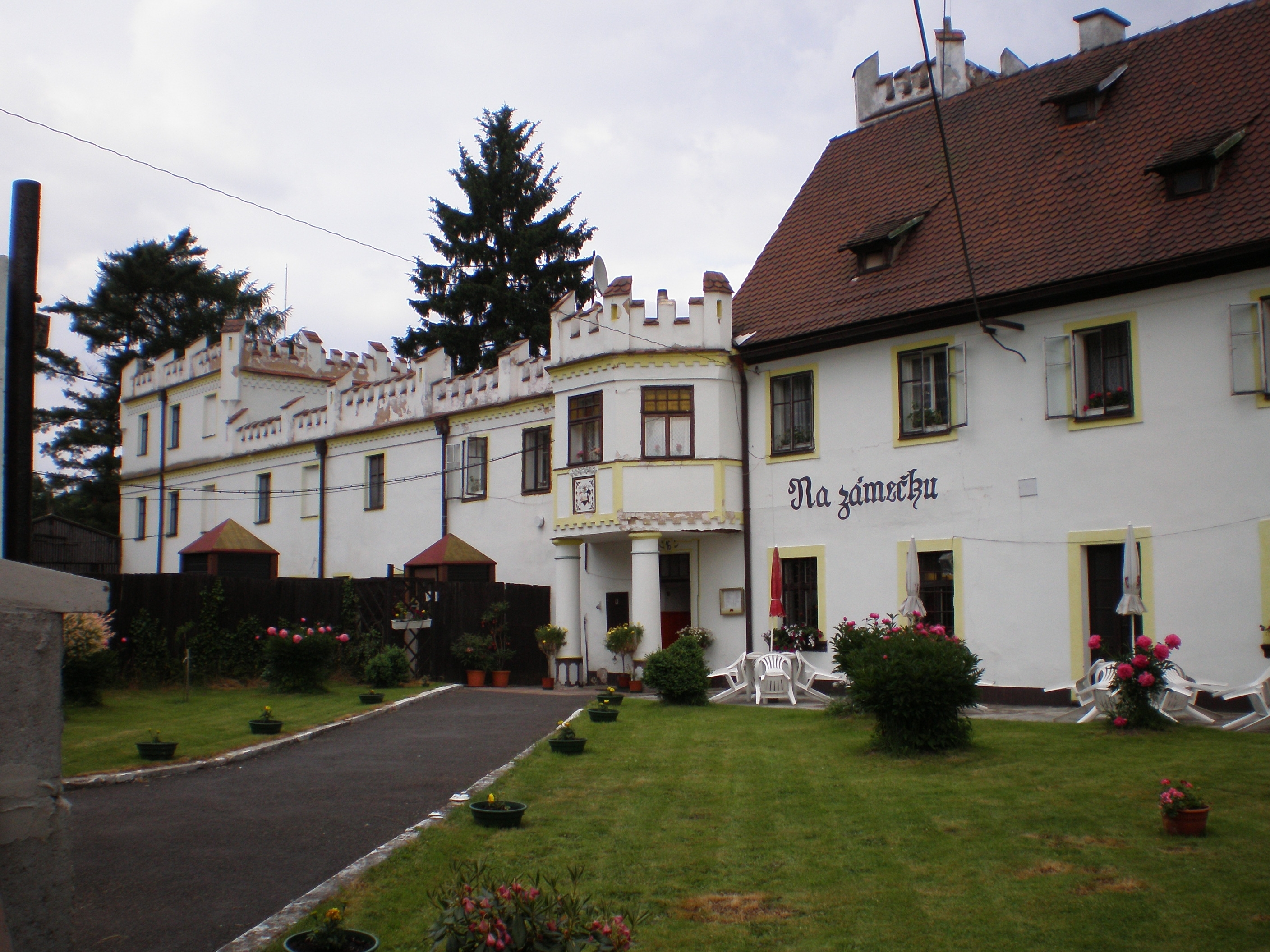
Doubrava Castle in Doubrava.

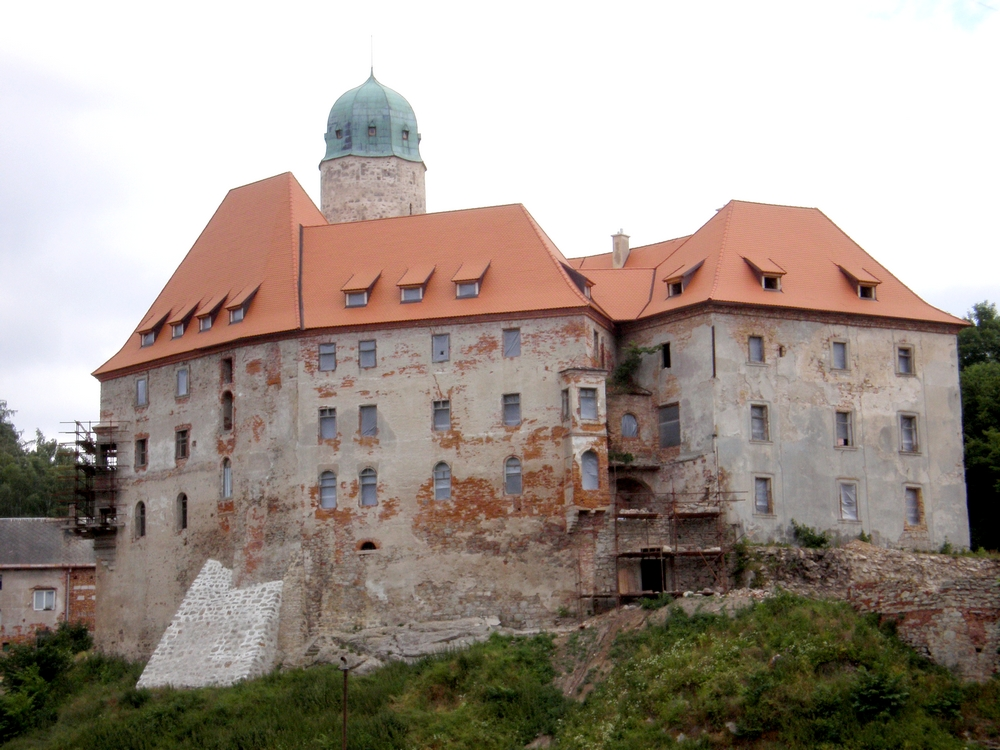
Libá Castle in Libá

== See also ==
- The von Zedtwitz Life Master Pairs, national bridge championship
