= List of protected heritage sites in Philippeville =

This table shows an overview of the protected heritage sites in the Walloon town Philippeville. This list is part of Belgium's national heritage.

Object	Year/architect	Town/section	Address	Coordinates	Number^{?}	Image
Church of Saint-Philippe ^{(nl)} ^{(fr)}		Philippeville		50.196036°N 4.545394°E	93056-CLT-0001-01 Info	Kerk Saint-Philippe
Town hall ^{(nl)} ^{(fr)}	1877	Philippeville		50.196355°N 4.542567°E	93056-CLT-0002-01 Info	Raadhuis
Ruins of the feudal castle of Fagnolle ^{(nl)} ^{(fr)}		Fagnolle Philippeville		50.109409°N 4.565538°E	93056-CLT-0003-01 Info	Ruïnes van feodaal kasteel van Fagnolle
Ensemble, consisting of feudal castle ruins Fagnolle, the gatehouse and surrounding areas ^{(nl)} ^{(fr)}		Fagnolle Philippeville		50.109253°N 4.564745°E	93056-CLT-0004-01 Info	Ensemble, bestaande uit ruïnes feodaal kasteel van Fagnolle, het poortgebouw en de omliggende terreinen
Ruins of the feudal castle of Fagnolle: the gatehouse, outer walls and inner walls of the moat, turrets and the two columns on either side of the entrance outside the castle and the ensemble of the ruins of the castle and surrounding area ^{(nl)} ^{(fr)}		Fagnolle Philippeville		50.109124°N 4.565824°E	93056-CLT-0005-01 Info	Ruïnes van feodaal kasteel van Fagnolle: het poortgebouw, de buitenmuren en binnenmuren van de gracht, torentjes en de twee kolommen aan weerszijden van de ingang buiten het kasteel en het ensemble van de ruïnes van het kasteel en de omliggende terreinen
Vicarage, former home of the sheriff ^{(nl)} ^{(fr)}		Philippeville	rue du Bailli n°18	50.105578°N 4.572845°E	93056-CLT-0006-01 Info	Pastorie, voormalige huis van de baljuw
Château-ferme of Roly ^{(nl)} ^{(fr)}		Roly Philippeville	place de Roly n°8	50.134779°N 4.537698°E	93056-CLT-0008-01 Info	Kasteelhoeve
Church of Saint-Denis ^{(nl)} ^{(fr)}		Philippeville		50.135473°N 4.539834°E	93056-CLT-0009-01 Info	Kerk Saint-Denis
Chapel of Saint-Medard in the 17th century ^{(nl)} ^{(fr)}		Samart Philippeville	Samart	50.177806°N 4.534449°E	93056-CLT-0010-01 Info	Kapel Saint-Médard uit de 17e eeuw
Samart Castle: facades, roofs and interiors, and buildings: facades and roofs. ^{(nl)} ^{(fr)}		Philippeville		50.177935°N 4.534766°E	93056-CLT-0011-01 Info	Kasteel van Samart: gevels, daken en interieur, en bijgebouwen: gevels en daken.
Samart Castle: northern and eastern buildings (facades and roofs) and the surrounding wall north and east, and the ensemble of these structures and the surrounding areas ^{(nl)} ^{(fr)}		Philippeville		50.178200°N 4.535345°E	93056-CLT-0013-01 Info	Kasteel van Samart: noordelijke en oostelijke bijgebouwen (gevels en daken) en de omliggende muur ten noorden en oosten, en het ensemble van deze constructies en de omliggende terreinen
Stone "Aux Sacrifices" and its surroundings, at a place called "Tienne Fagnes" ^{(nl)} ^{(fr)}		Philippeville		50.108756°N 4.587057°E	93056-CLT-0014-01 Info	
Bunch of Marmont ^{(nl)} ^{(fr)}		Philippeville		50.173479°N 4.668967°E	93056-CLT-0015-01 Info	
Castle farm small tower with "loopholes" (shooting slits) to the left of the main entrance ^{(nl)} ^{(fr)}		Philippeville		50.174304°N 4.520996°E	93056-CLT-0016-01 Info	Kasteelhoeve met kleine toren met schietgaten aan de linkerkant van de hoofdingang
"Caserne des Fours": facades, roofs and cladding and the ensemble of the internal walkways ^{(nl)} ^{(fr)}		Philippeville		50.195154°N 4.544110°E	93056-CLT-0017-01 Info	
The walls of the village Sautour and buildings located within them, setting conservation ^{(nl)} ^{(fr)}		Philippeville		50.170102°N 4.557503°E	93056-CLT-0018-01 Info	
Ruins of the walls of Sautour and gate known as a Roman gate ^{(nl)} ^{(fr)}		Philippeville		50.171017°N 4.559112°E	93056-CLT-0019-01 Info	
Chapel of Notre-Dame des Remparts ^{(nl)} ^{(fr)}		Philippeville		50.197455°N 4.548075°E	93056-CLT-0022-01 Info	
Washing place and the ensemble of the washing place with the surrounding area ^{(nl)} ^{(fr)}		Philippeville	rue de Fagnolle	50.104436°N 4.567371°E	93056-CLT-0024-01 Info	Wasplaats en het ensemble van de wasplaats met de omliggende terreinen
St. Martin's Church and walls of the cemetery, and the ensemble of the church and its surroundings, except for the garage at n ° 173 B, and part of the rue de Fagnolle, rue de la Foire and rue du Bailli ^{(nl)} ^{(fr)}		Fagnolle Philippeville		50.105100°N 4.570307°E	93056-CLT-0025-01 Info	Kerk Saint-Martin en muren van de begraafplaats, en het ensemble van de kerk en diens omgeving, uitgezonderd de garage aan parcelle n° 173 B, en een gedeelte van de rue de Fagnolle, rue de la Foire en rue du Bailli
The statue of Queen Louise-Marie ^{(nl)} ^{(fr)}		Philippeville	place d'Armes	50.196232°N 4.543525°E	93056-CLT-0028-01 Info	
Old hospital of the barracks: facades and roofs ^{(nl)} ^{(fr)}		Philippeville	rue de l'Hôpital n°6	50.196900°N 4.543794°E	93056-CLT-0029-01 Info	
Farm of Vieux-Sautour: facades and roofs, and the surrounding walls ^{(nl)} ^{(fr)}		Philippeville		50.165830°N 4.575043°E	93056-CLT-0030-01 Info	
Infantry Barracks adjacent to the courtyard of the Cavaliers and the establishment of a protection zone ^{(nl)} ^{(fr)}		Philippeville		50.195393°N 4.542191°E	93056-CLT-0031-01 Info	
Pump ^{(nl)} ^{(fr)}		Philippeville	rue du Quartier Brûlé	50.195848°N 4.540263°E	93056-CLT-0032-01 Info	
House: walls and roofs ^{(nl)} ^{(fr)}		Philippeville	rue de France n°s 17, 19, 21, 23, 25, 27, 29 en 31	50.196113°N 4.540446°E	93056-CLT-0034-01 Info	
Totality of the church of Saint-Jean Baptiste ^{(nl)} ^{(fr)}		Philippeville		50.174482°N 4.521307°E	93056-CLT-0035-01 Info	
Archaeological remains at a place called "Les Machenees" and the ensemble of the site and surrounding area. Establishment of a protection zone. ^{(nl)} ^{(fr)}		Philippeville		50.183721°N 4.520684°E	93056-CLT-0036-01 Info	
Roly Village ^{(nl)} ^{(fr)}		Roly Philippeville		50.136225°N 4.539837°E	93056-CLT-0039-01 Info	Dorp Roly

== See also ==
- List of protected heritage sites in Namur (province)
- Philippeville
