= Villers-le-Gambon =

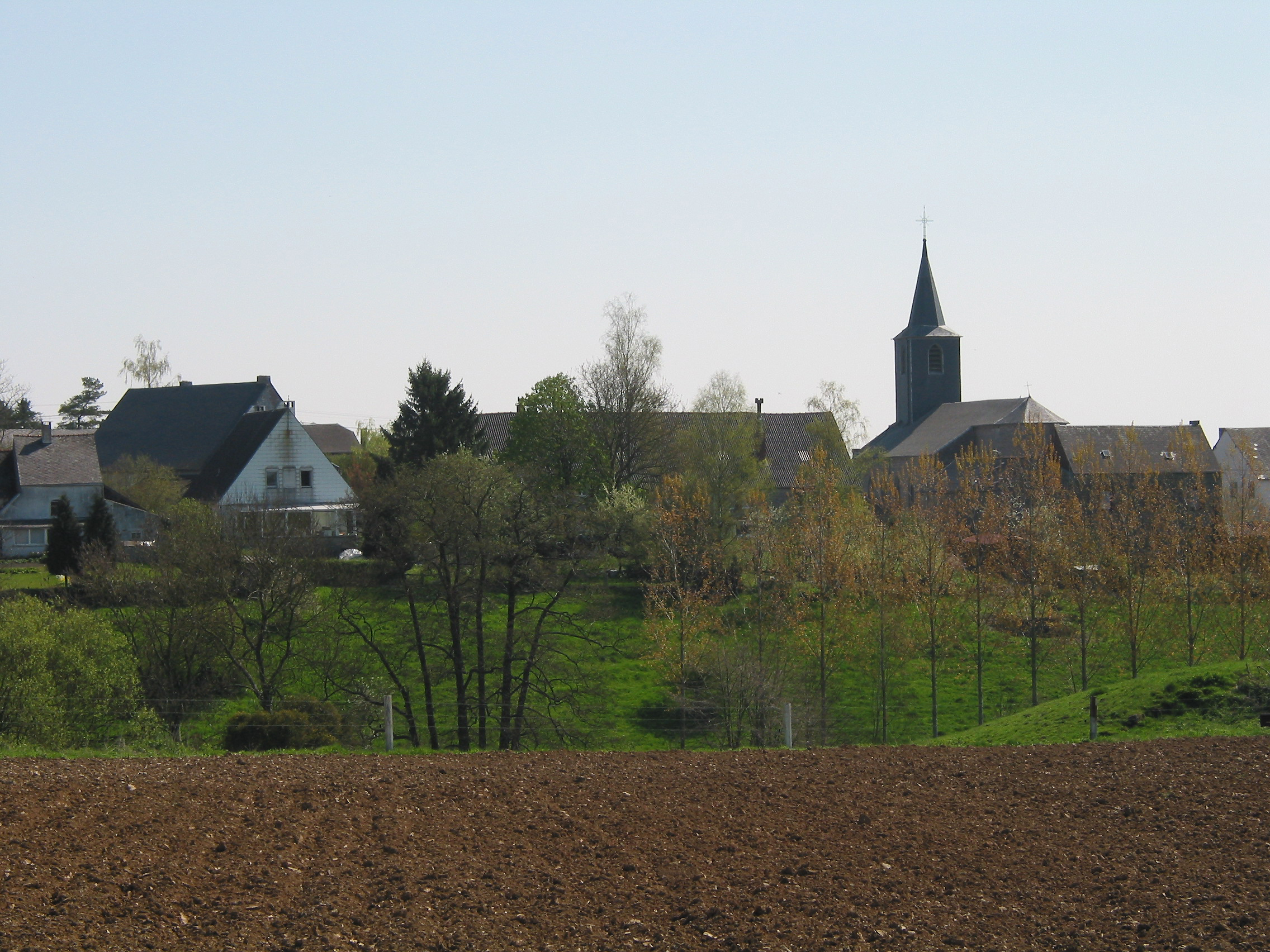
- Villers-le-Gambon

- Location within Belgium Location within Europe
- Coordinates: 50°11′00″N 04°36′00″E
- Country: Belgium
- Region: Wallonia
- Province: Namur
- Municipality: Philippeville

Villers-le-Gambon is a village of Wallonia in the municipality of Philippeville, located in the province of Namur, Belgium.

The area has been settled since pre-Christian times. Excavations have brought to light graves from the Frankish era. When the Florennes Abbey was founded, Villers-le-Gambon was among the villages donated to the abbey. After the Middle Ages, the village suffered devastation during the wars between Spain and France. The current village church, in Neo-Gothic style, dates from 1850.
