= Roly, Belgium =

Roly
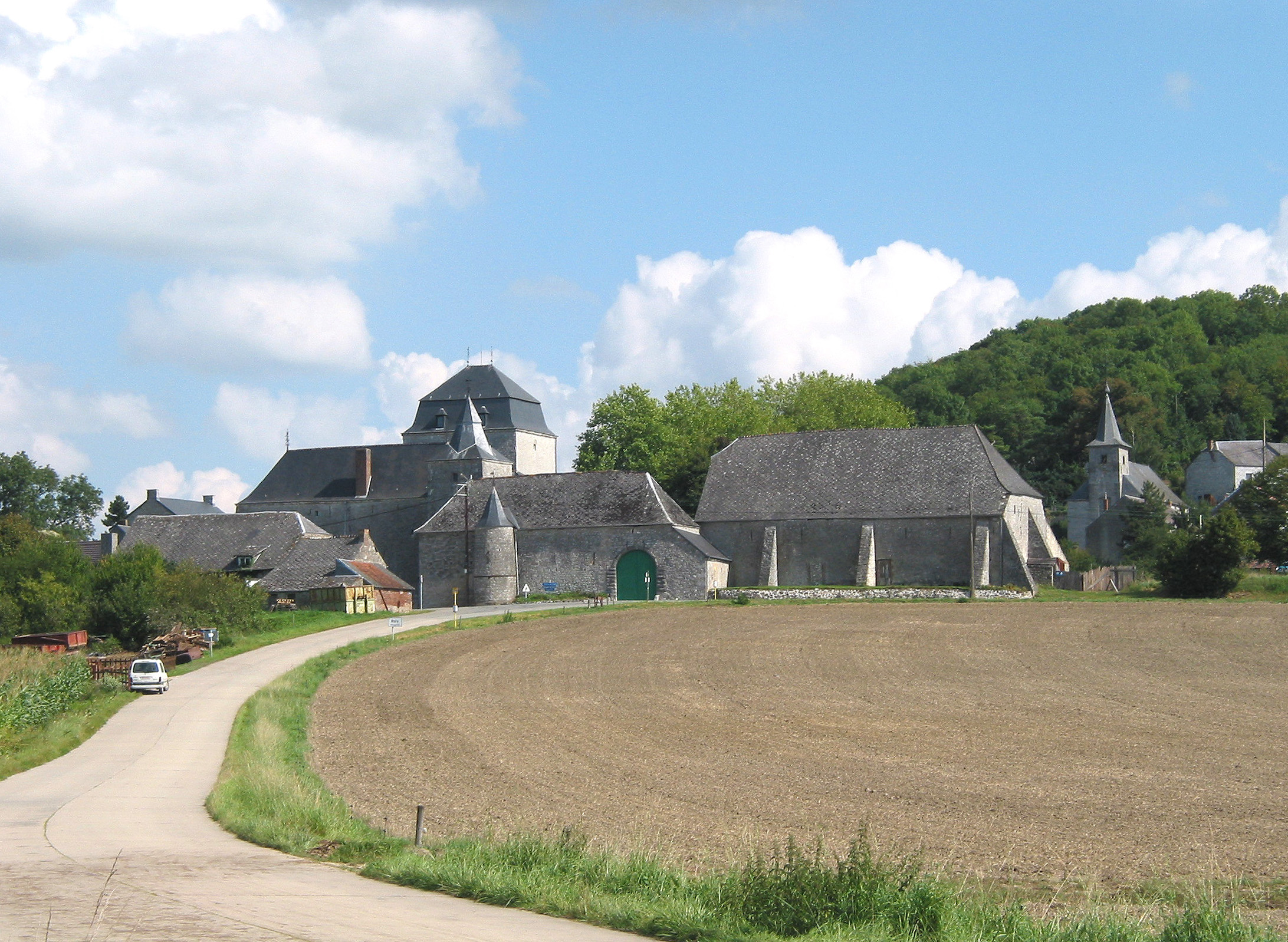
- Roly

- Location within Belgium Location within Europe
- Coordinates: 50°08′00″N 04°32′00″E
- Country: Belgium
- Region: Wallonia
- Province: Namur
- Municipality: Philippeville

Roly (French pronunciation: [ʁɔli]) is a village of Wallonia in the municipality of Philippeville, located in the province of Namur, Belgium.

Remains from the Neolithic have been discovered in the area, indicating a long human presence in the area. From the 11th century, the area was divided between the Florennes Abbey and the local lords of Roly, who constructed the Château-ferme de Roly still dominating the village. The village also contains a church with furnishings from the 17th and 18th centuries.
