= Mampathy =

- village
- Country: India
- State: Kerala
- District: Kottayam

Languages
  - Official: Malayalam, English
- Time zone: UTC+5:30 (IST)
- Postal codes: 686540, 686545
- Vehicle registration: KL-
- Coastline: 0 kilometres (0 mi)

Mampathy is a small village in between Santhipuram and Koothrapally, or between Santhipuram and Karukachal. Nearest colonies are Kizhuvattu colony, Inchakuzhiyil colony and Kuttickal colony.

== Demographics ==
Over 100 families staying here in this area. This area comes around 1 km diameter. Accessibility wise you can reach here from Karukachal or Koothrappally or Thiruvalla. There is a bus running. through Mampathy, connecting all these places.

== History ==
In the early 19th century, this place was completely forest, and belonged to two three families. Over years all kind of people migrated to this place and now over 100 families are staying in this small area. Initially this area was populated with Hindu Nair castes, but now its equally balanced with all kinds of castes and religions except Muslims.

== Schools ==
Nearest schools are:

- Panayampala govt school
- Koothrappally st mary's school.

== Transportation ==
Nearest Railway Stations are:

- Changanacherry
- Kottayam

Nearest colleges & Educational institute

- GURU college Of Nursing
- Elite Tuition Center, Karukachal

== Surnames ==
- Thakidiyel
- Kunnel
- Thaipral
- Thekku porathu
- Vadakku porathu
- Malayil
- Pediekkal
- Kizhuvattu
- Thengolil
- Mozhikkal
- Chackungal
- Thottacherry House
