= St. Mary's Syro Malabar Catholic Church, Koothrapally =

Syro Malabar Catholic Church in Kerala, India

St. Mary's Syro-Malabar Catholic Church (Koothrapally)
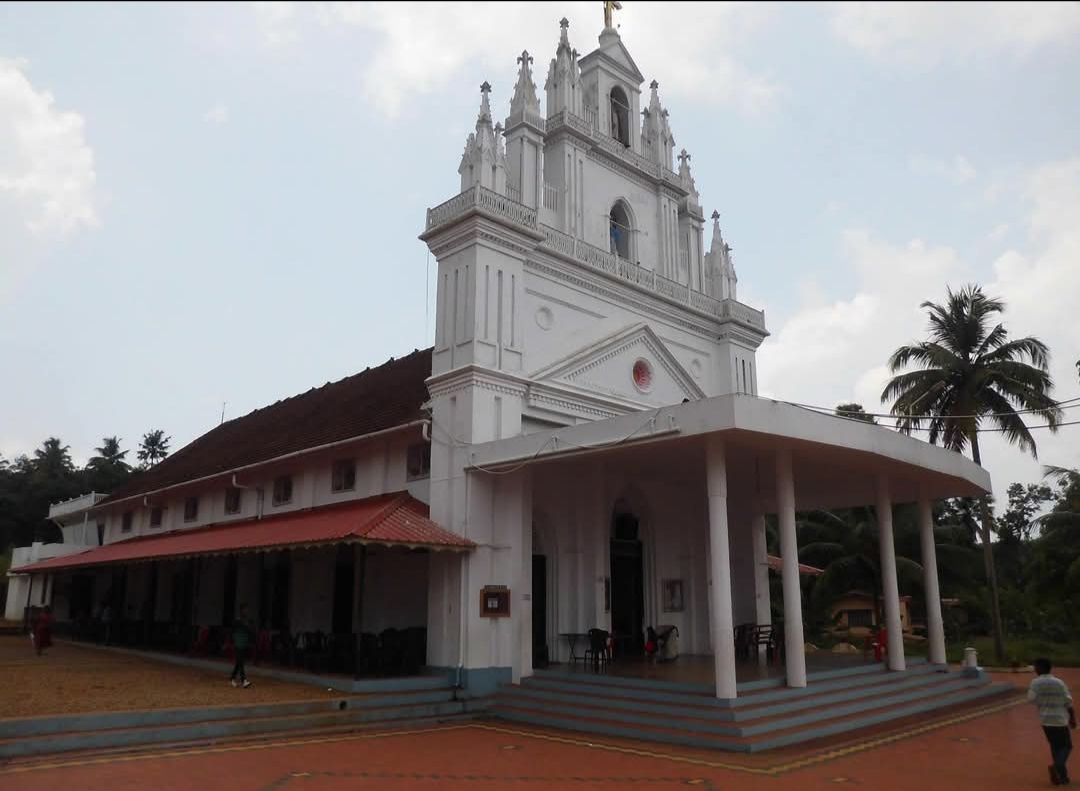

Religion
- Affiliation: Syro-Malabar Catholic Church
- District: Kottayam District
- Festival: Muthappan Perunnal
- Leadership: Archbishop Mar Thomas Tharayil
- Year consecrated: AD 1877

Location
- Location: Karukachal, Kottayam, Kerala, India
- Municipality: Changanassery
- State: Kerala
- Country: India
- Interactive map of St. Mary's Syro-Malabar Catholic Church (Koothrapally)
- Coordinates: 9°29′0″N 76°37′0″E

Architecture
- Style: Kerala Architecture
- Founder: Palakunnel Marth Mariam Kathananar
- Established: 1876

St. Mary's Syro Malabar Catholic Church, Koothrapally is a Catholic Church near Karukachal in Kottayam district of Kerala, India. It is under Nedumkunnam forane of Archeparchy of Changanasserry. The Church was founded in 1876 by the Indian Christian leader Palakunnel Mathai Mariam Kathanar most famously known as Palakunnel Veliyachan. He is known for his struggles for Dalit community in 19th century. The Church is widely known for its patronage of Saint Maurus whom the devotees call 'Vishuda Maurus Muthapan'. The feast 'Muthappan Perunnal' commemorating his name occurs during the week of Epiphany Season with Pindikuthi Perunnal being part of festive.

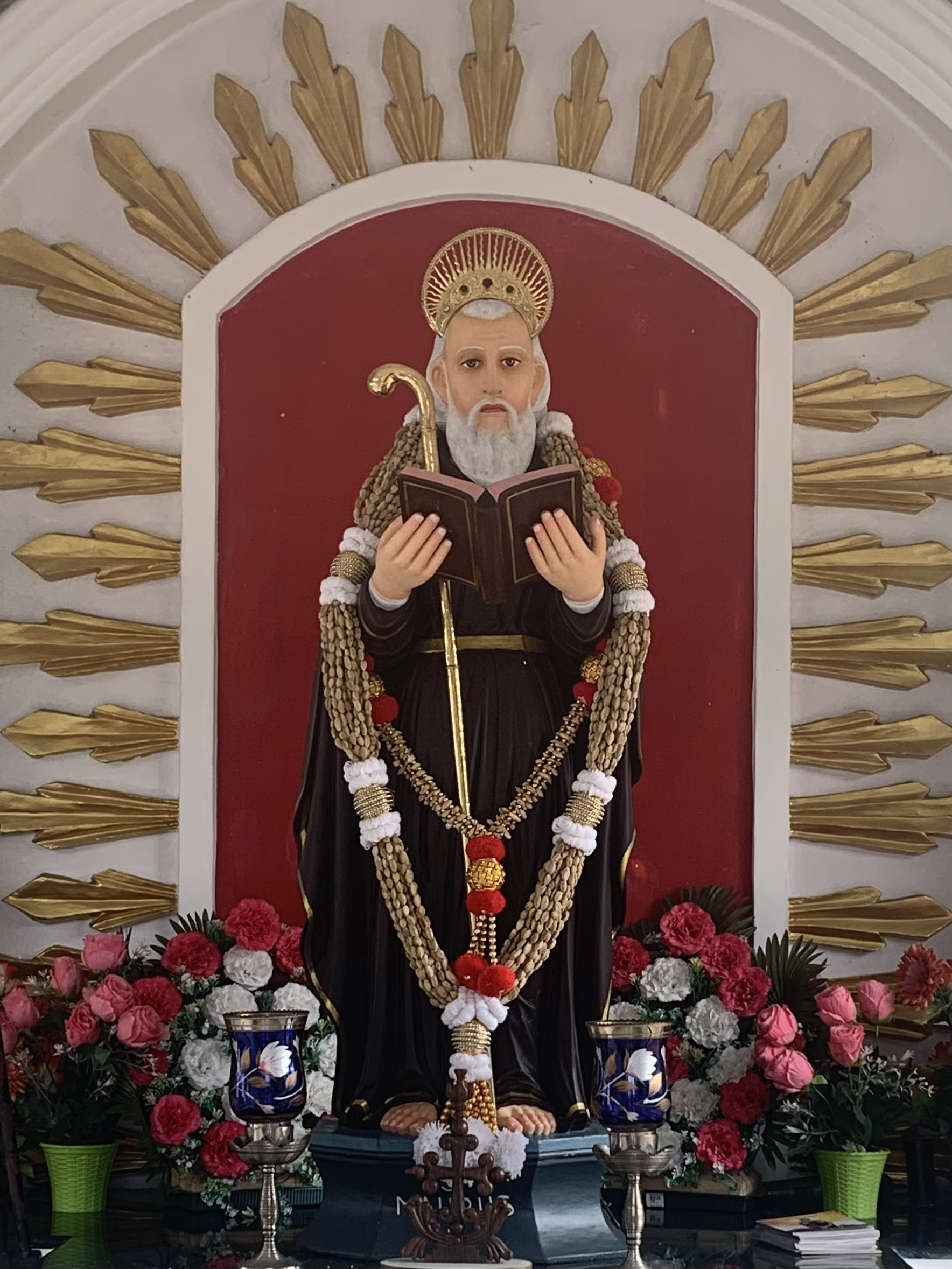
Statue of St. Maurus

St. Maurus was an Italian Catholic monk known as the first disciple of St. Benedict of Nursia. He is famous for his rescue of his fellow monk St. Placidus from drowning. His relics were brought from Italy by Palakunnel Veliyachen and a statue of St. Maurus was installed in chapel. It is the only church in Asia that serves St Maurus as a Patron Saint.

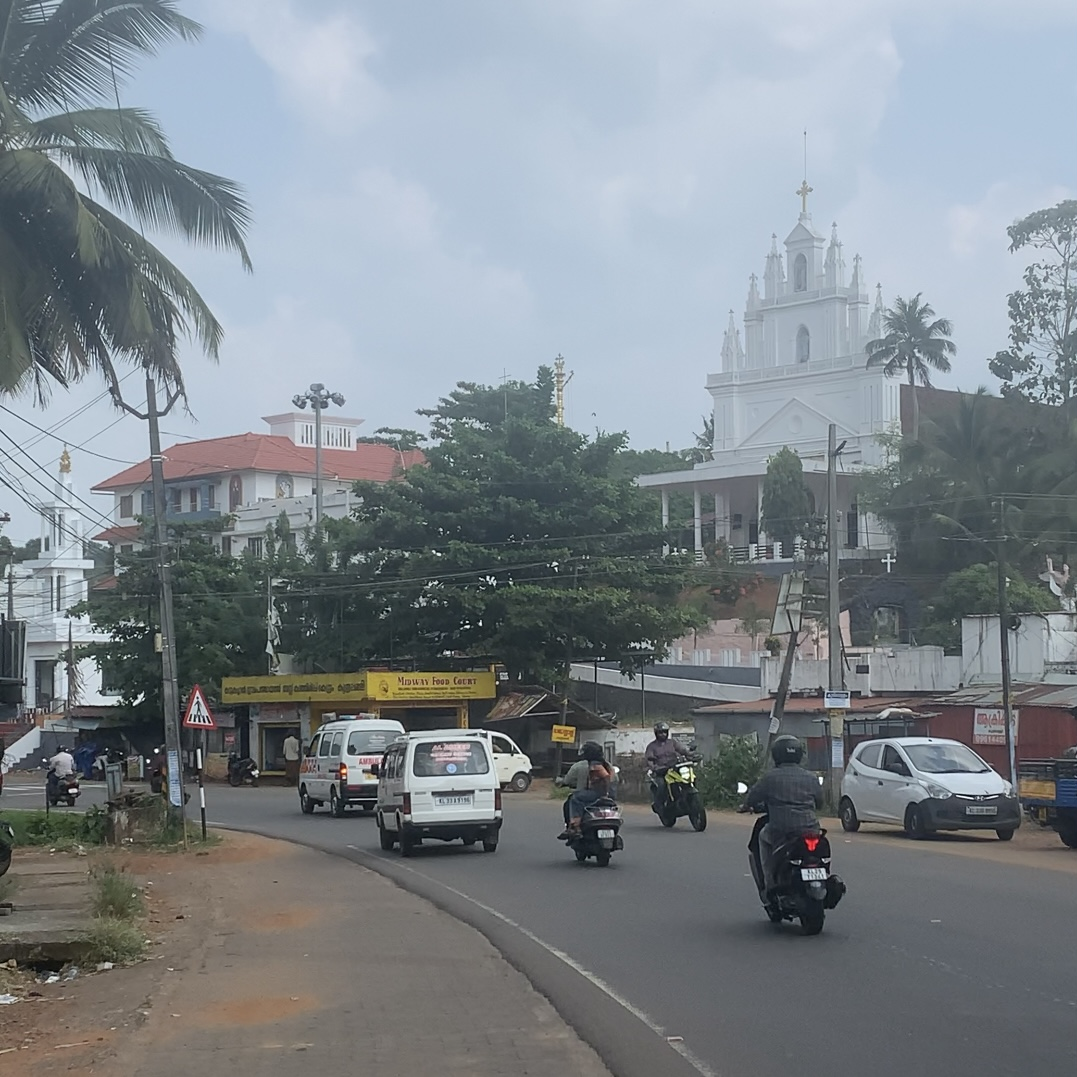
Koothrapally Village

== History ==
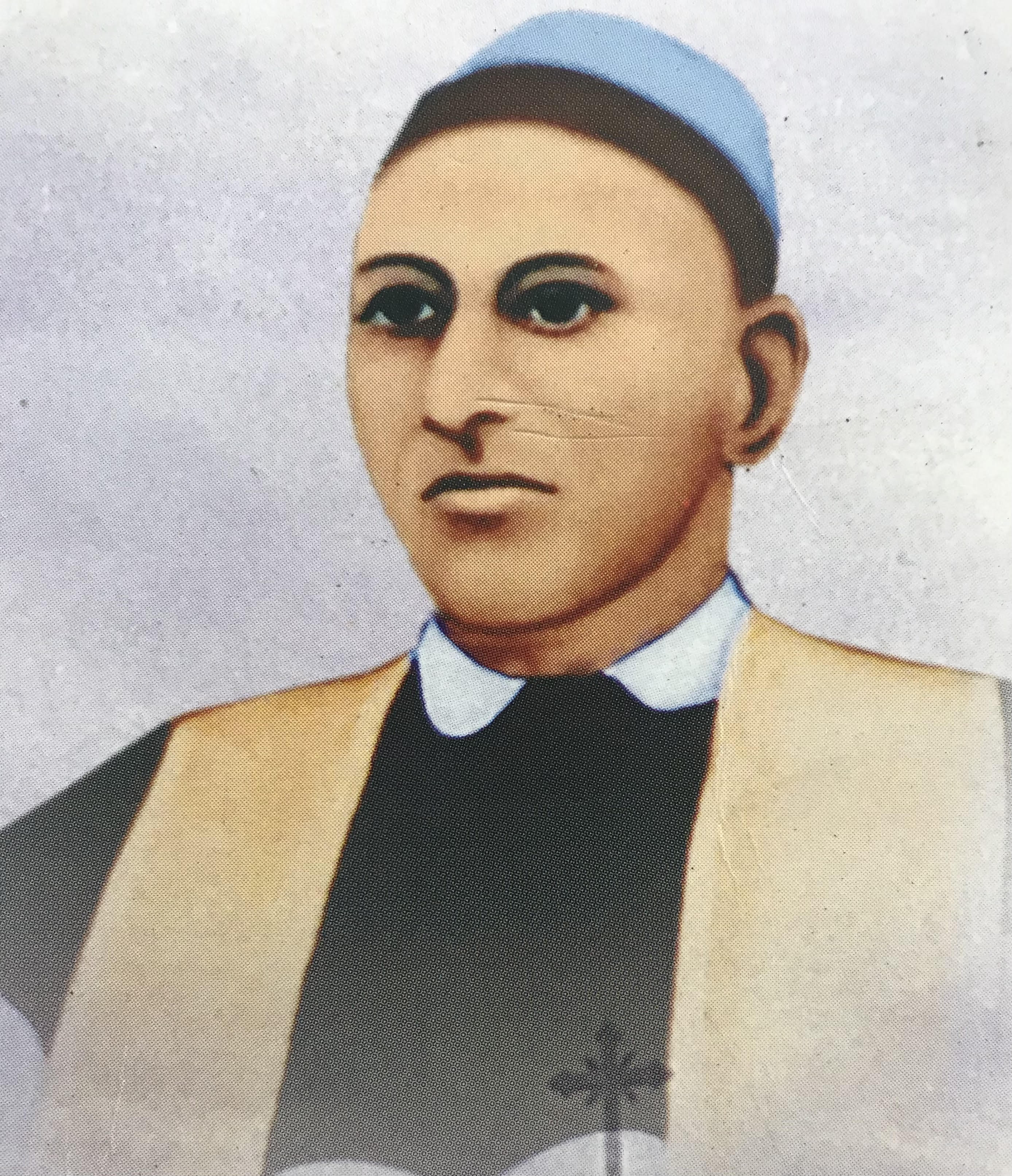
Palakunnel Mathai Mariam Kathanar

Palakunnel Mathai Mariam Kathanar who was a Christian leader established the church Koothrapally in the name of Mother Mary in the year 1876. In the early 19th century, Many people of low caste was denied entry to Nedumkunnam Church. Palakunnel Veliyachan, who was a member of the Nedumkunnam church stood against this caste discrimination and built a church in his own land for the people. Later he brought the relics of St. Maurus from Italy for the church and statue of saint was placed in a small chapel near roadside where Valiyachan was buried which was later transferred inside of the church. Today, the church is one of the biggest parishes in Archeparchy of Changanasserry.

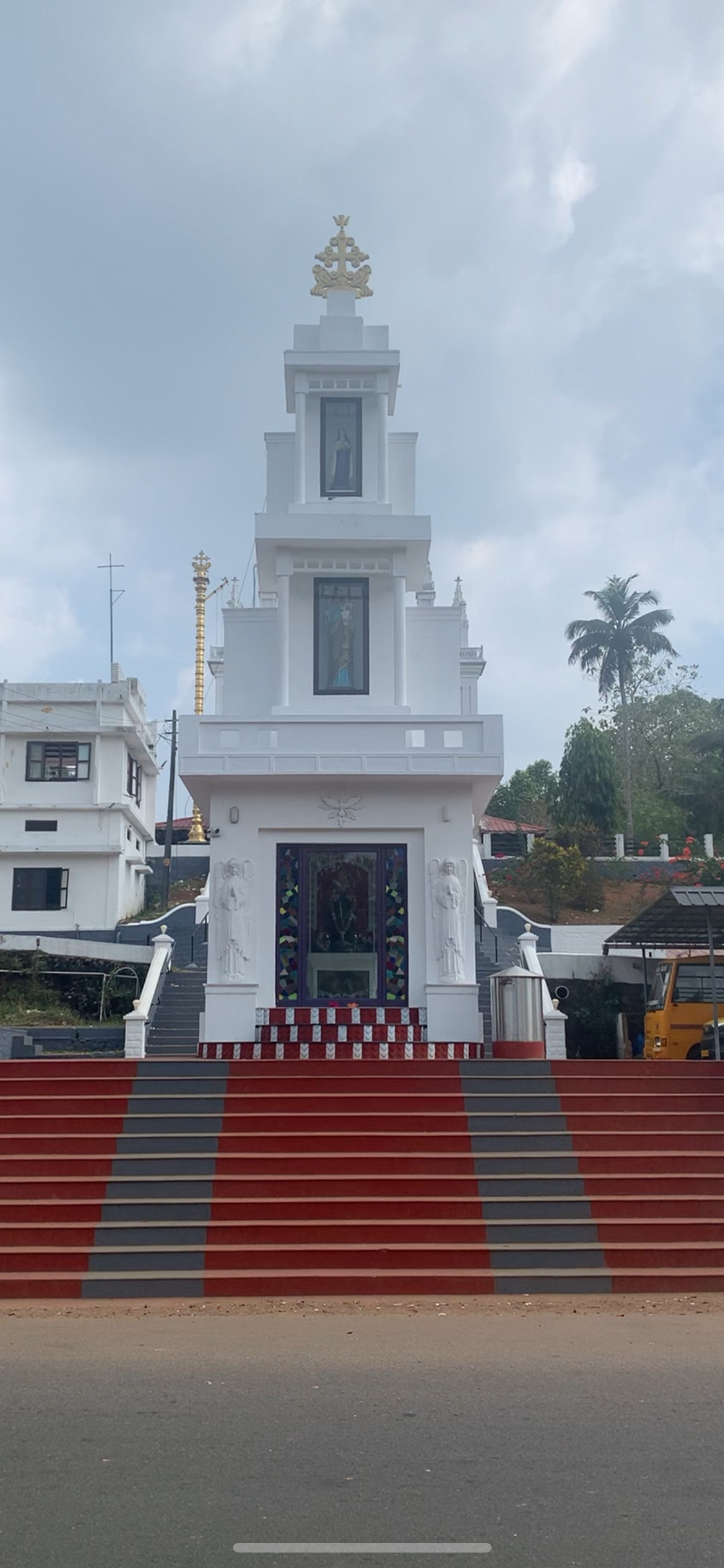
Chapel of St. Maurus

== Misompady Hamlet ==
Misompady is a place in Koothrapally village, located at Kottayam District in Kerala state. It is currently under ownership of Eparchy of Palai.

== Festivals ==
Feast of Saint Maurus (വിശുദ്ധ മാവുരുസ് മുത്തപ്പന്റെ പെരുന്നാൾ)

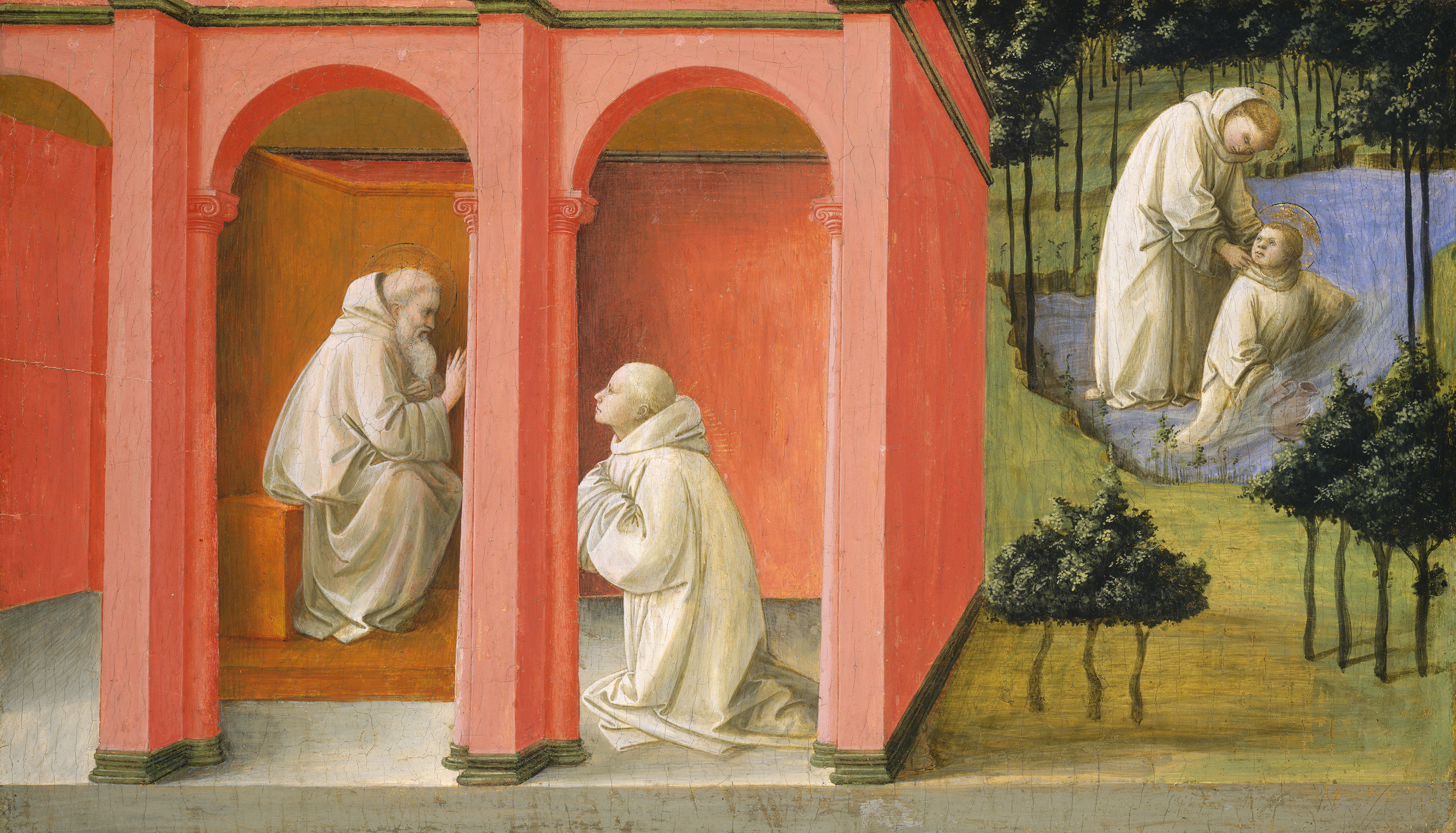
Saint Benedict Orders Saint Maurus to the Rescue of Saint Placidus

Muthappan Perunnal is a festival hosted by the villagers of Koothrapally during the first week of Epiphany (near or on January 15) devoting themselves to saint. It is believed to cure sickness and famine and bring prosperity to the land. Pachoru Nercha, a traditional Christian delicacy made with rice and jaggery syrup is distributed during the festive. An old tradition of holding novena in the chapel near road is still continued today. Even though it is not a pilgrim centre, people from all over the state participate the perunnal. In early 20th century, an elephant was rumoured to kneel down before the statue of saint. There has also been a tradition of Malankara Catholic Church to serve a holy mass in the church during this time.

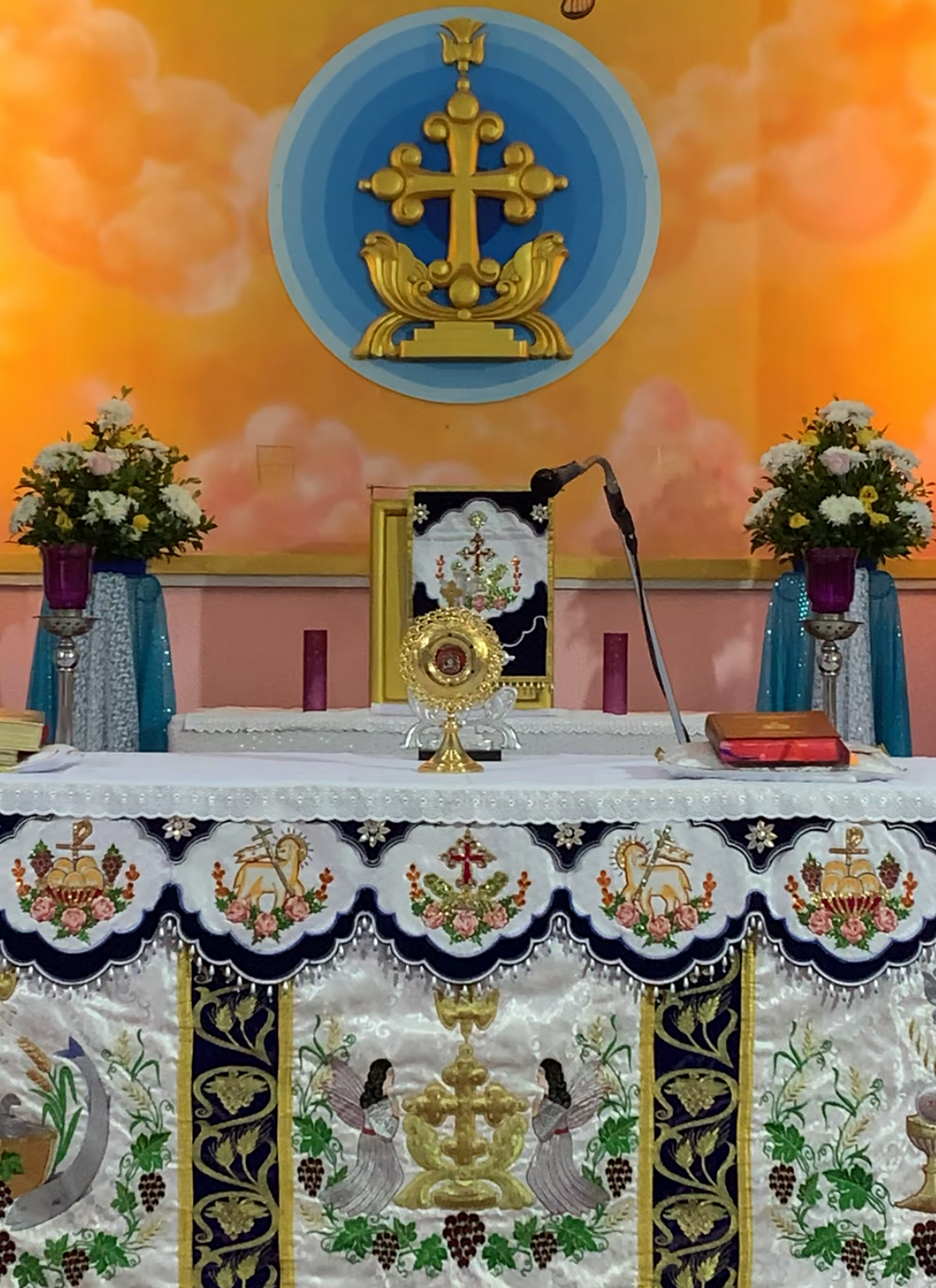
Relics of St Maurus

The perunnal has earned the church the nickname 'Muthappan Pally'.

Commemoration of Our Lady of Sorrows (പരിശുദ്ധ വ്യാകുലമാതാവിന്റെ തിരുന്നാൾ)

A small festival of Our Lady of Sorrows is held in Vrichika Masam of Malayalam Calendar.

The church is undergoing restoration works as its been more than 100 years old , the current church is currently demolished and the mass session is held in the hall till the further completion of the church ..

== See also ==
- St. Maurus
- Palakunnel Valiyachan
- Karukachal
- Reliquary of St. Maurus
