= Fagnolle =

Fagnolle Fagnole (Walloon)
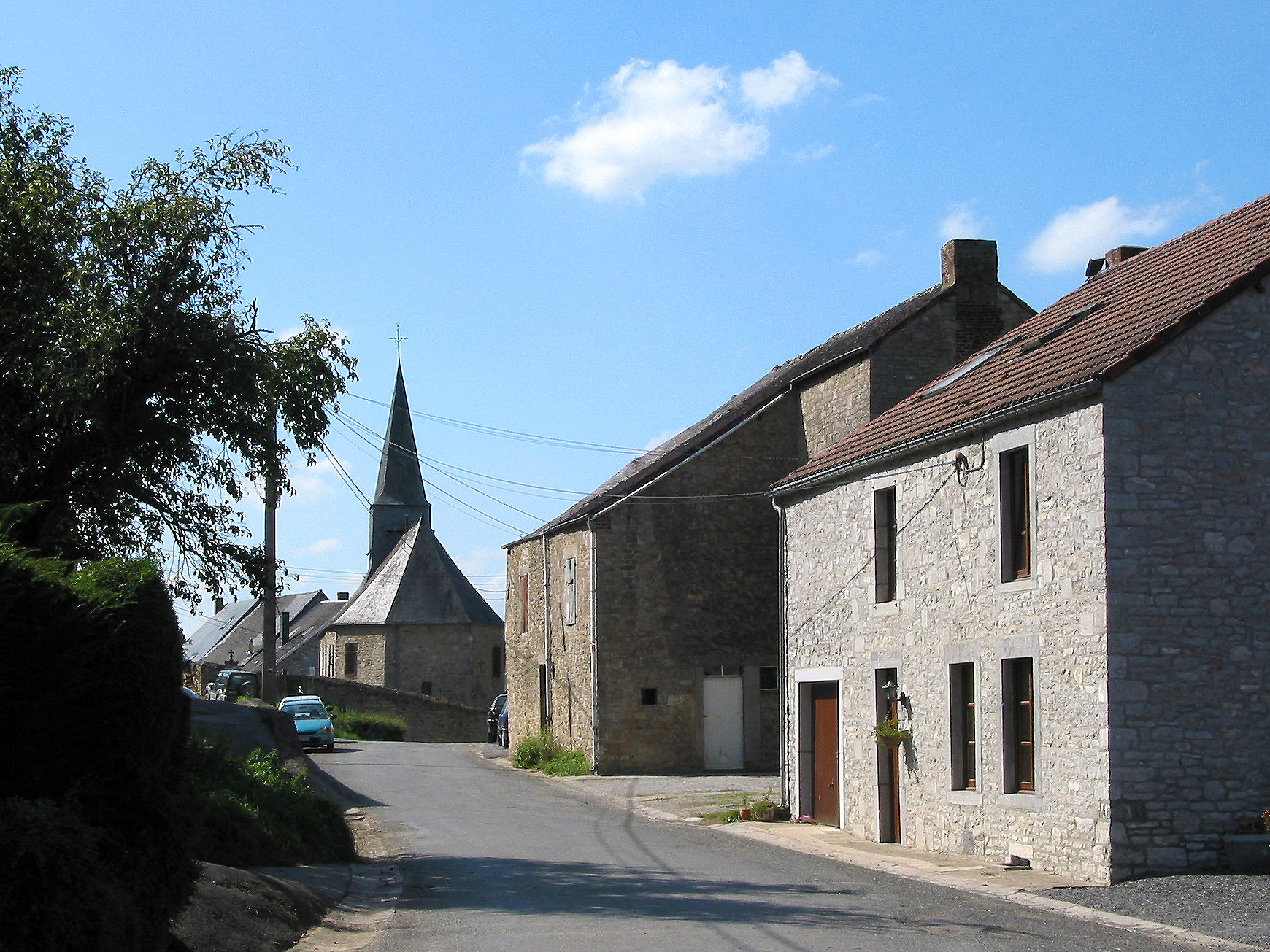

- Location in Belgium
- Coordinates: 50°06′N 04°34′E
- Country: Belgium
- Region: Wallonia
- Province: Namur
- Municipality: Philippeville

Fagnolle (French pronunciation: [faɲɔl]; Walloon: Fagnole) is a village of Wallonia and a district of the municipality of Philippeville, located in the province of Namur, Belgium.

Fagnolle was a member of the Les Plus Beaux Villages de Wallonie ("The Most Beautiful Villages of Wallonia") association. until 2020.

Fagnolle Castle is located just outside the village.

It was the center of the Imperial County of Fagnolle, belonging to the House of Ligne.
