= Palakunnel Valiyachan =

Indian Christian leader

Palakunnel Mathai Mariyam Kathanar
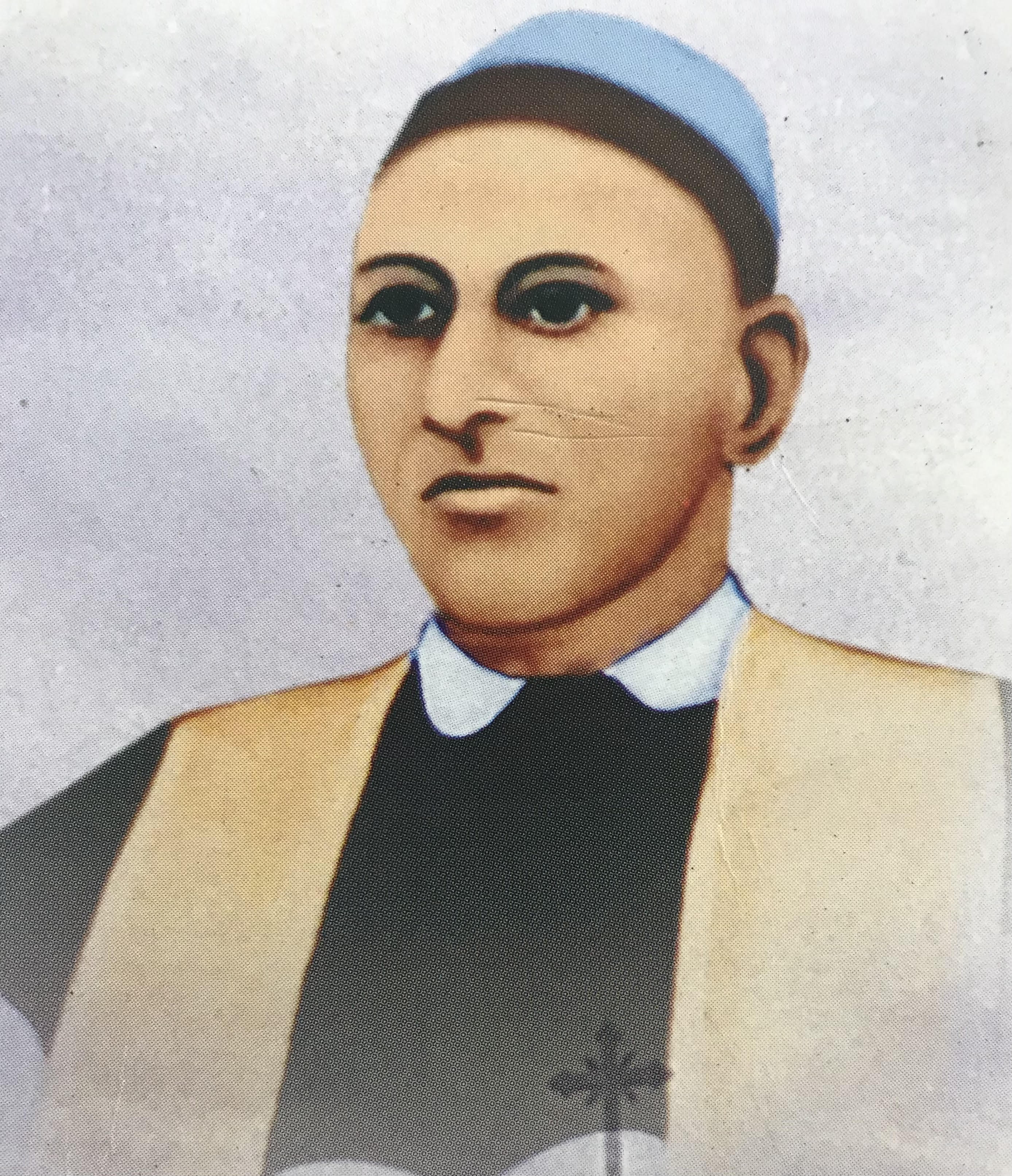
- Church: Syro-Malabar Church
- Diocese: Archdiocese of Changanacherry

Orders
- Ordination: 2 July 1855

Personal details
- Born: Mathen (മാത്തൻ); 20 February 1831 Koothrapally, Kingdom of Travancore (modern day Kerala, India)
- Died: 20 April 1900 (aged 69) Koothrapally, Kingdom of Travancore
- Buried: Koothrapally, Kerala, India
- Denomination: Malankara Church (Paḻayakūṟ)

Palakunnel Mathai Mariam Kathanar (20 February 1831 – 20 April 1900) was an Indian clergy member that served in the Archdiocese of Changanacherry.

== Early life ==
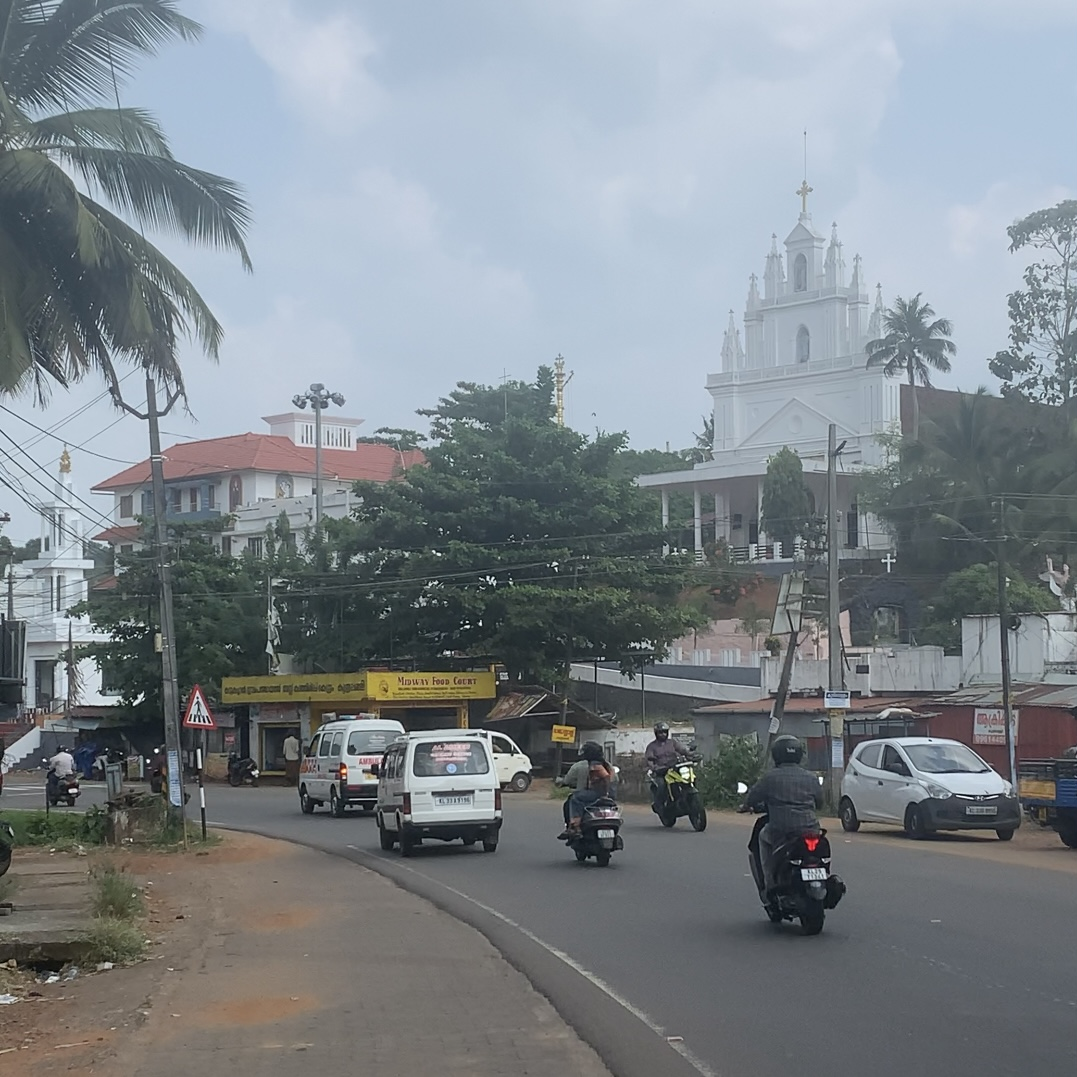
Koothrapally village

He was born on 20 February 1831, in Koothrapally to Palakunnel Puthiyachirakav Itticheriyath and Mariam. In his childhood, he was known as Mathen. Mathen joined Mannanam Monastery for studies in 1845. He completed his studies under the tutelage of Kuriakose Elias Chavara, the Abbot of Mannanam Ashram. He was ordained as a priest at Mannanam by Bernardine Baccenelli of St. Teresa, O.C.D, the Vicar Apostolic of Verapoly on 2 July 1855.

== Social reformations ==
Throughout his life he worked for the betterment of people of all castes and especially the illiterate Dalits who were suffering in the society. Initiatives were taken to provide education to Dalits. He spent money from his own hands and established Churches and Schools to teach the Dalits. In the month of April 1870, Valiyachan obtained permission from T. Madhava Rao, who was the Diwan of Travancore, to say Mass at the Central Prison, Poojappura for inmates. Valyachan offered mass at Central Prison, Poojappura in the same year on Palm Sunday.

== Contributions ==
List of Churches and institutions constructed by Valyachan

1. Koratti Church, Erumely – 1858
2. Puthiya Chirakkavu Church – 1859
3. Koothrapally Chappel – 1876

== Nalagamam ==
Valyachan's Nalagamam (Diary) is a valuable source for the history of Syriac Church of Kerala and the social and cultural history of Central Travancore from 1857 to 1896. The main events of that time and the historical course of the Syriac Church were carefully observed and recorded. He Has a habit of writing down all these in his own perspective. Nalagamam helps us to know about the religious moral and cultural standard of living of Nasrani Nasrani community at that time. Construction of Changanassery – Peerumedu road in 1863, establishment of Alappuzha Light House, smallpox disease which killed thousands of people in Changanassery and other places, locust plague on Easter Thursday in 1878, earthquake in 1881, floods in Kuttanad in 1882 and 1883, etc. are all explained in Nalagamam.

== Death ==
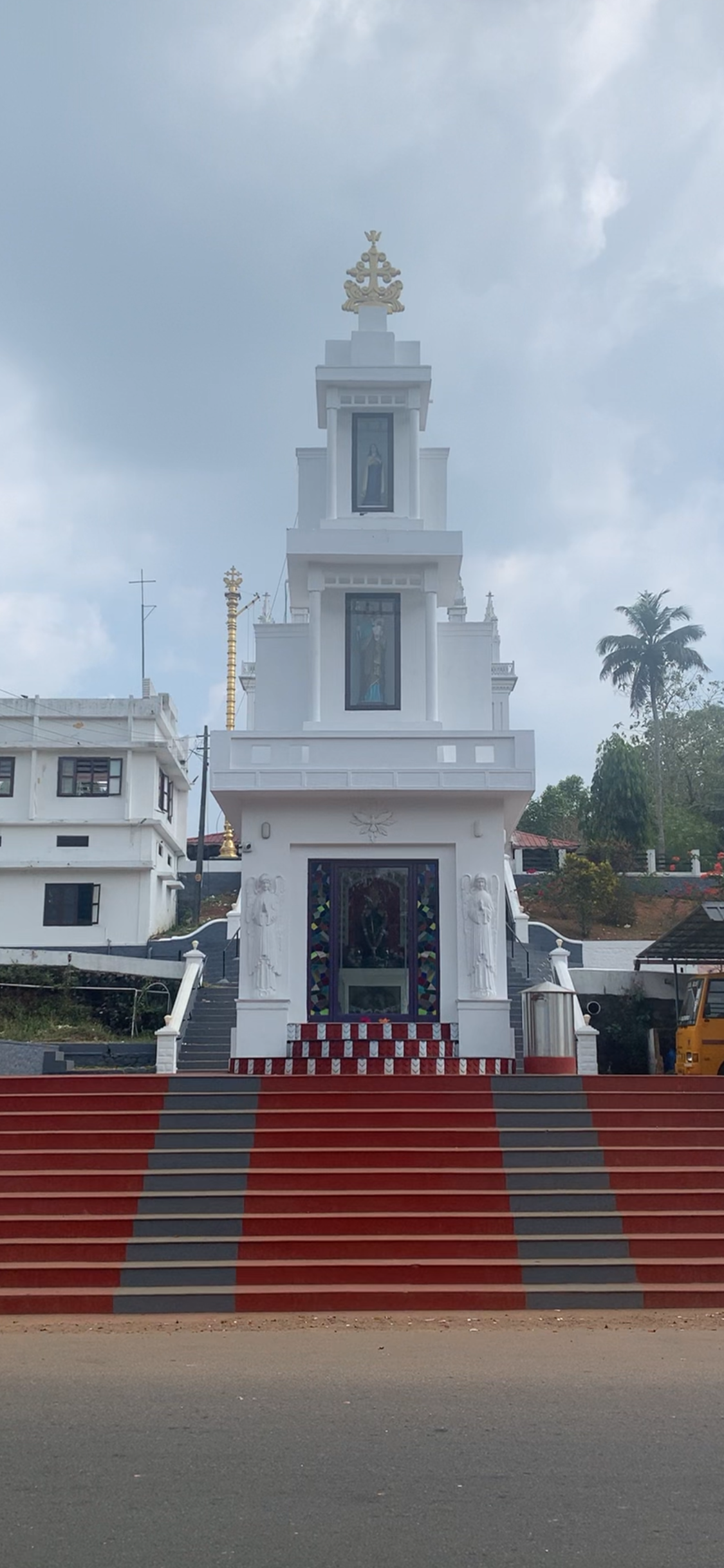
Valiyachan was buried in St Maurus Chapel, later transferred into the church

Palakunnel Mathai Mariam Katanar died on 20 April 1900. On 21 April, he was buried in a self-made grave in a chapel built by Valyachan for the dedication of Saint Maurus on the roadside near Koothrapally church. Later his mortal remains were moved inside the newly built Koothrapally church.
