= Saint Maurus =

6th-century Bemedictine Saint

Saint Maurus OSB
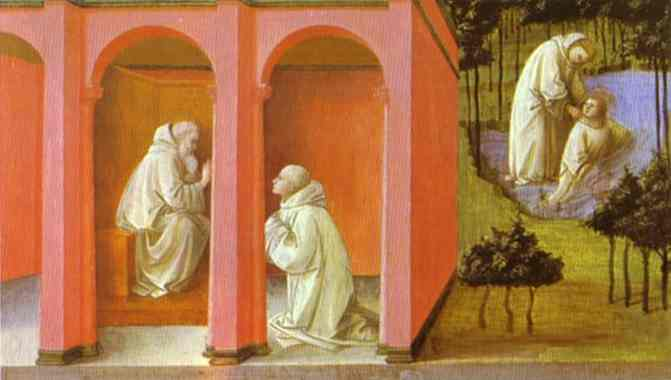
- Saint Benedict orders Saint Maurus to the rescue of Saint Placidus by Friar Filippo Lippi, O.Carm. (ca.1445).
- Born: January 1, 512
- Died: January 15, 584
- Venerated in: Catholic Church; Eastern Orthodox Church
- Feast: before 1969: January 15; after 1969: November 22
- Attributes: crutch; Benedictine habit, abbot's cross and a spade
- Patronage: disabled people; arcoal burners; cobblers; coppersmiths; shoemakers, Azores, invoked against rheumatism, epilepsy, gout, hoarseness, cold

Saint Maurus (French: Maur; Italian: Mauro) (512–584) was a Benedictine monk best known as the first disciple of Benedict of Nursia. He is mentioned in Gregory the Great's biography of the latter as the first oblate, offered to the monastery by his noble Roman parents as a young boy to be brought up in the monastic life.

Four stories involving Maurus, recounted by Gregory, formed a pattern for the ideal formation of a Benedictine monk. The most famous of these involved Maurus's rescue of Placidus, a younger boy offered to Benedict alongside Maurus. The incident has been reproduced in many medieval and Renaissance paintings.

His feast is on 15 January 15 in the 2001 Roman Martyrology and on the same date along with Placid in the Proper Masses for the Use of the Benedictine Confederation.

== Life of Saint Maurus ==
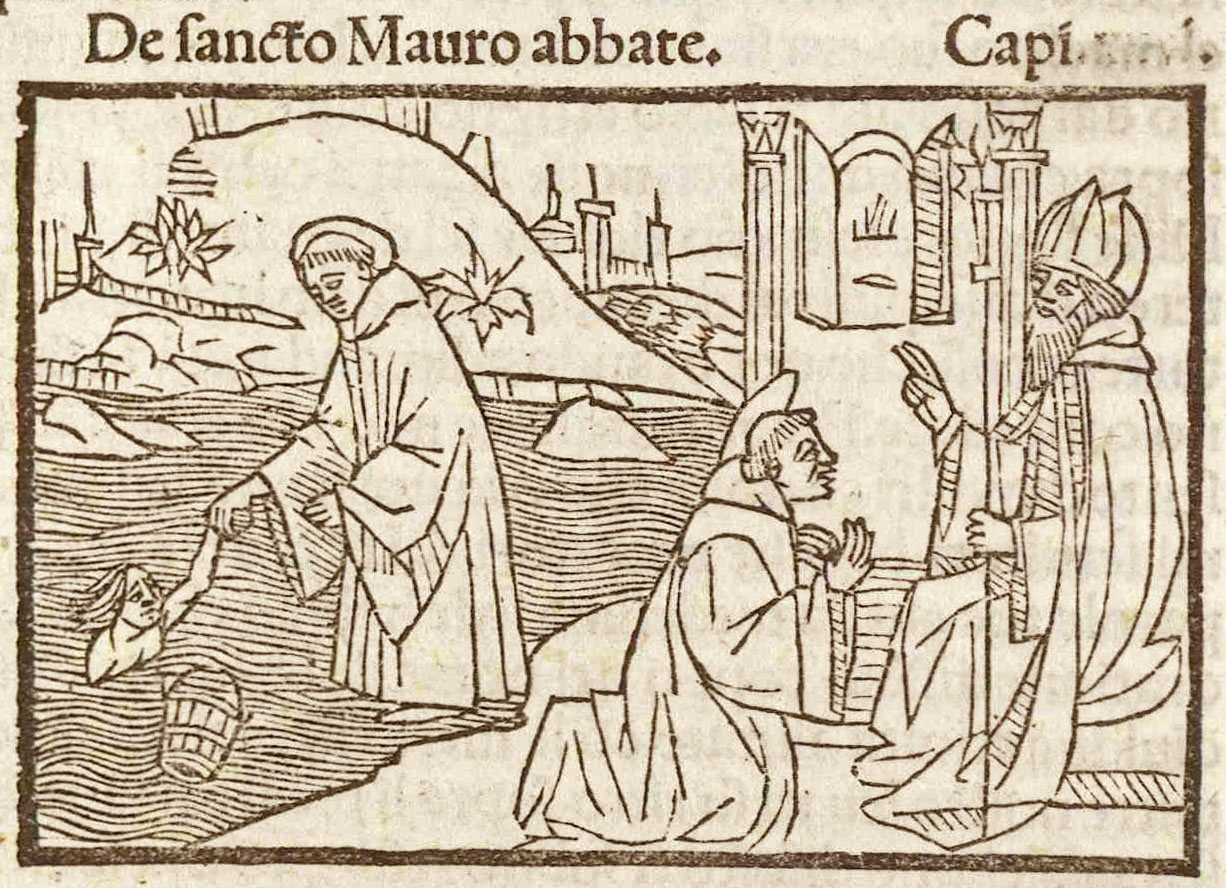
Maurus in the Golden Legend (1497)

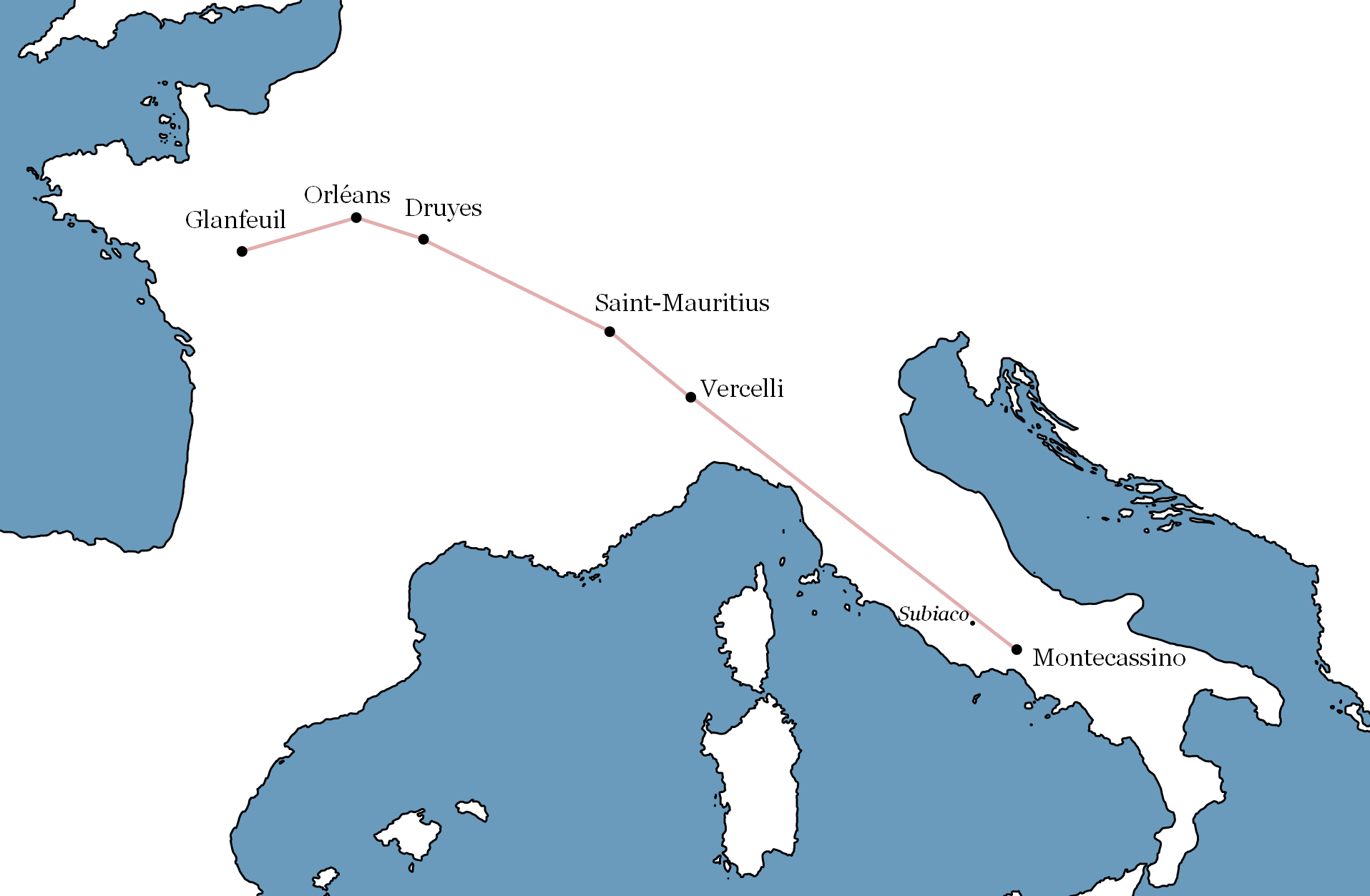
The Journey of Saint Maurus to Glanfeuil, c. 543

A long Life of St. Maurus was supposedly composed by one of Maurus's 6th-century contemporaries, completed around 604. This original Vita came into the possession of Abbot Odo of Glanfeuil, who found it to be in terrible condition and the Latin to be illegible. Thus, he sought to copy it while improving the language, publishing his version in 863. According to this account, the bishop of Le Mans, in western France, sent a delegation asking Benedict for a group of monks to travel from Benedict's new abbey of Monte Cassino to establish monastic life in France according to the Rule of St. Benedict. The Life recounts the long journey of Maurus and his companions from Italy to France, marked by many adventures and miracles, as Maurus is transformed from a youthful disciple of Benedict into a powerful, miracle-working holy man in his own right. According to this account, after the great pilgrimage to Francia, Maurus founded Glanfeuil Abbey as the first Benedictine monastery in Gaul. It was located on the south bank of the Loire river, a few miles east of Angers. The nave of its thirteenth-century church and some vineyards remain today (according to tradition, the chenin grape was first cultivated at this monastery).

Some have thought the Vita to be a forgery by Odo of Glanfeuil. Most famously Hippolyte Delehaye, who called it so in an off-hand comment in his Introduction to Hagiography. However, there is no general academic consensus on the authenticity of the Vita. The Bollandists noted in the conclusion of their discussion of the Vita that "Odo would indeed have earned greater gratitude from a curious posterity if he had published it as he found it, or if he wished to add anything, had done so in a separate commentary." Scholars such as Beda Adlhoch, meanwhile, defended a more reliable Odo. The relics of Saint Maurus were discovered in 845 by one of Odo's predecessors, Gauzlin. Glanfeuil was also in close proximity to two other famous and prosperous Benedictine centers: Fleury, housing Saint Benedict's relics, and Le Mans, housing that of Scholastica's. All writers, at least from the ninth century, are unanimous in affirming with Amalarius, that Maurus of Anjou, the French abbot, was the same Maurus who was the disciple of Benedict; which is also proved against certain modern critics, by Thierry Ruinart in his Apologia Missionis St. Mauri.

== Benedictine tradition ==
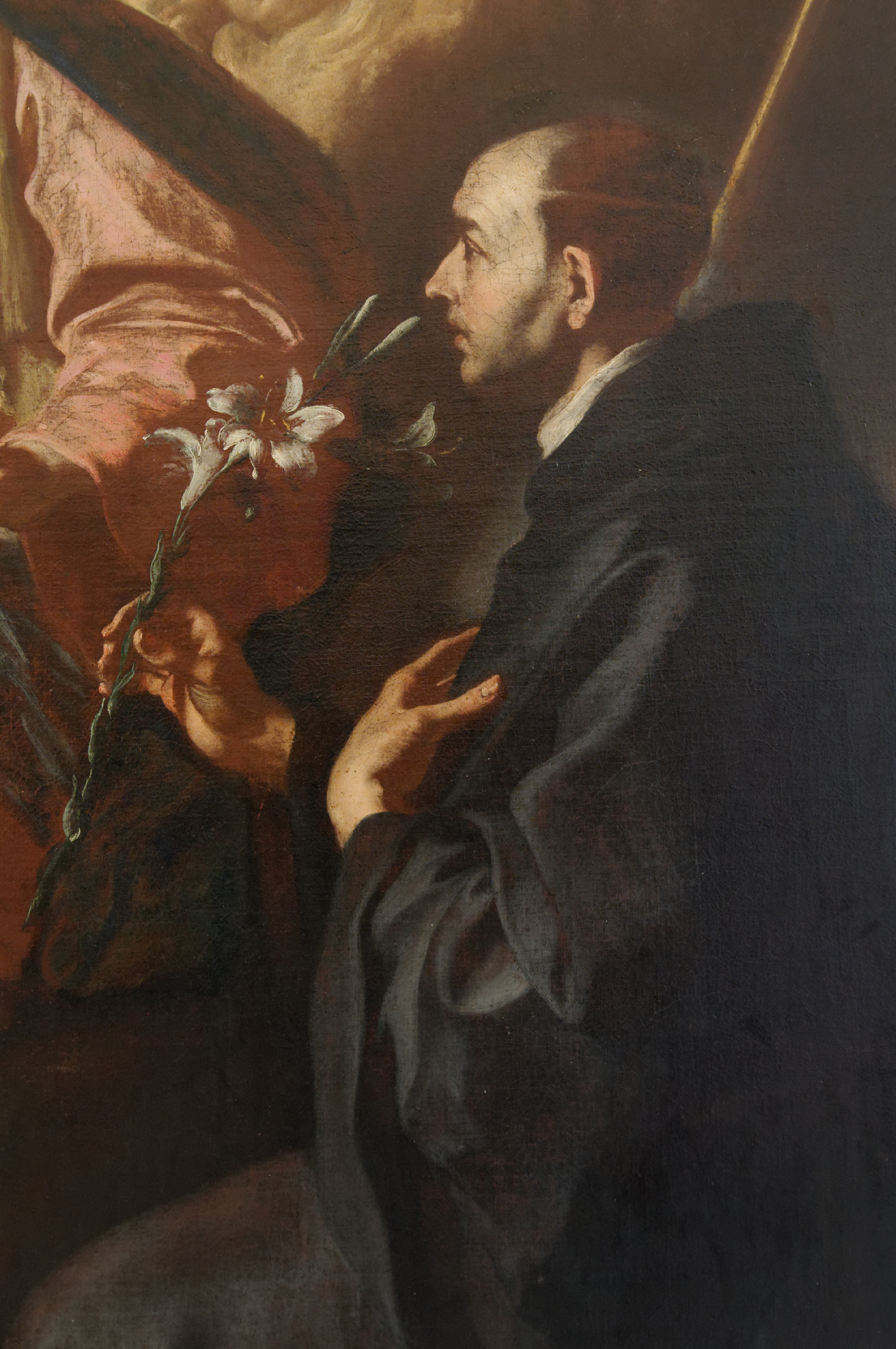
Detail from Madonna and Child with St Maurus, Castel Nuovo Napoli

Maurus was born c. 510, the son of Equitius, a Roman nobleman. At the age of about twelve, Maurus was entrusted to the care of Benedict at Subiaco to be educated. Gregory the Great in the Dialogues recounts a tale wherein the young oblate Placidus was sent to fetch water from the lake and was carried away by the current. Realizing this, Benedict sent Maurus to rescue the boy. Hurrying to reach Placidus, Maurus ran out upon the water. After bringing Placidus back to shore, Maurus attributed the miracle to the prayers of Benedict; the abbot, to his disciple's obedience.

Maurus was ordained a deacon and, subsequently, Benedict, before leaving for Monte Cassino, appointed him coadjutor at Subiaco. During his tenure, various miraculous cures were attributed to his prayers. Around 528, Benedict summoned Maurus to join him at Monte Cassino.

Around 543, Innocentius, the Bishop of Mans, sent his vicar, Adenard, to Monte Cassino to request Benedict to send some monks to Gaul. Maurus was dispatched and, during the journey, obtained some cures for the sick and injured encountered along the way. Through the generosity of King Theudebert, he founded Glanfeuil Abbey, which he governed for many years. He resigned the abbacy in 581 to spend the remainder of his life in solitude and prayer. The abbey of Glanfeuil was later called St. Maur-sur-Loire. Maurus died at Glanfeuil Abbey on 15 January 584.

== Veneration ==
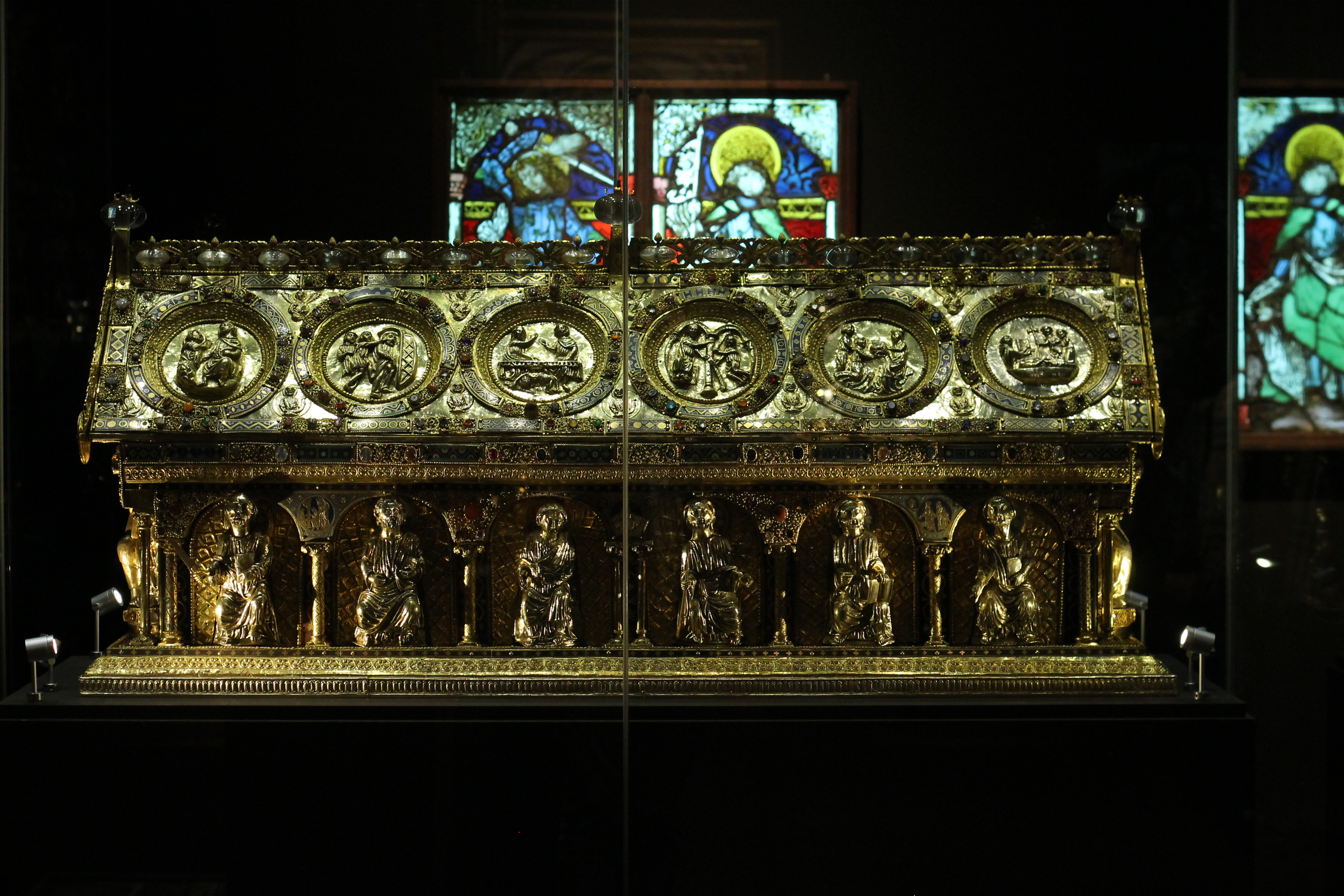
Reliquary of St. Maurus

Maurus was originally buried in the abbey church at Glanfeuil. When, in 868, Odo and the monks of Glanfeuil were obliged to flee to Paris in the face of Vikings marauding along the Loire, the remains of Maurus were translated to the abbey of Saint-Pierre-des-Fossés, later renamed Saint-Maur-des-Fossés. In 1750, the relics were relocated to Saint-Germain-des-Prés, where they remained until dispersed by a Parisian mob during the French Revolution. Maurus is still venerated by Benedictine congregations today, many monks adopting his name and dedicating monasteries to his patronage.

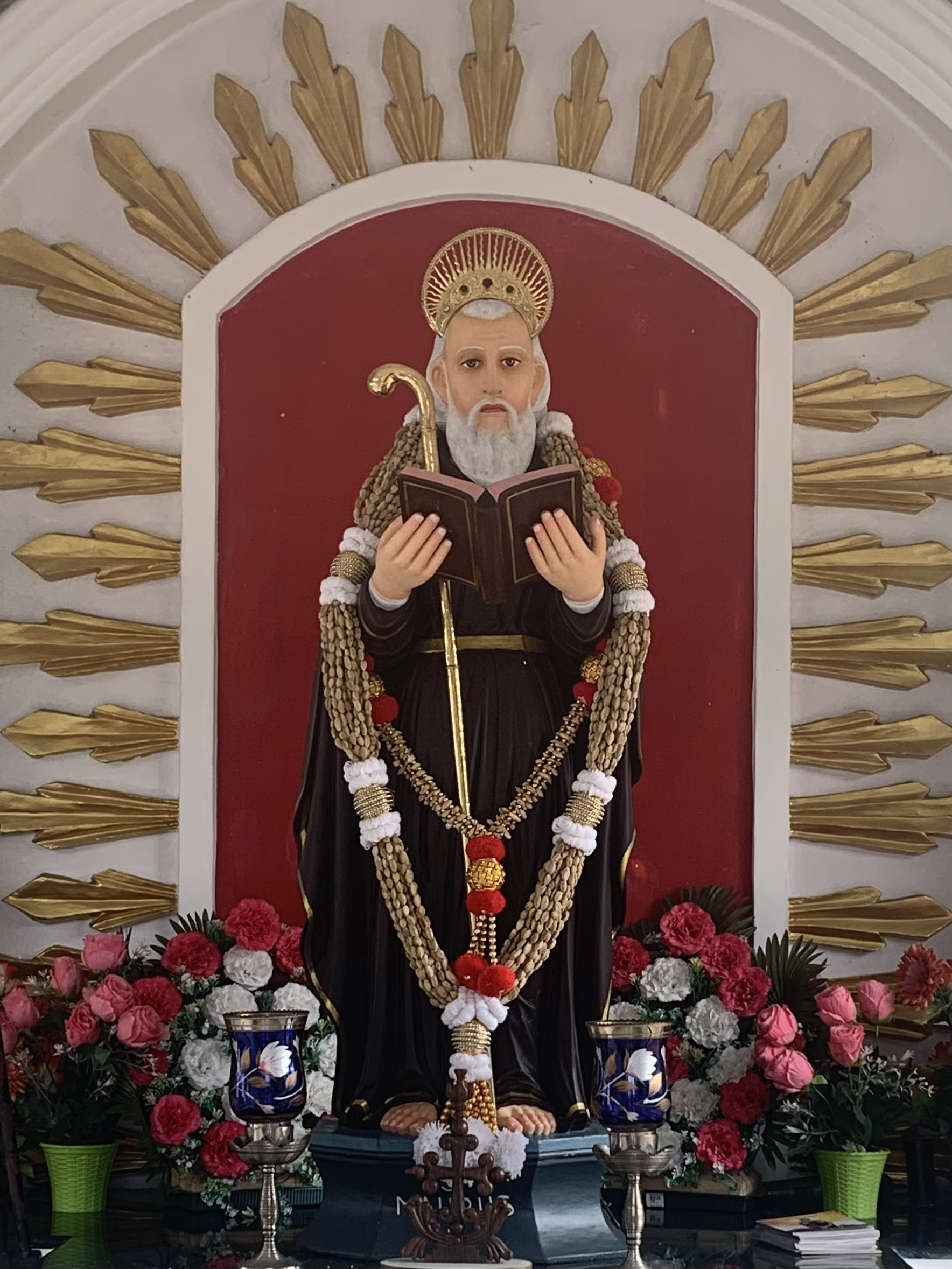
Statue of St. Maurus in India

The cult of Maurus slowly spread to monasteries throughout France and by the 11th century had been adopted by Monte Cassino in Italy, along with a revived cult of Placidus. By the late Middle Ages, the cult of Maurus, often associated with that of Placidus, had spread to all Benedictine monasteries. Maurus is venerated even in India, where he is highly honoured in certain areas of the southern state of Kerala. A village in Kerala named Koothrappally is dedicated to St Maurus. The feast of St Maurus is observed in the parish Church of St Mary, where villagers, irrespective of their religion, consider St Maurus the patron saint of the village. Palakunnel Valiyachan, who established the Koothrappally Church, constructed a small chapel on St.Maurus in 1890. Thus, the veneration of Maurus at Koothrapply completed the century.

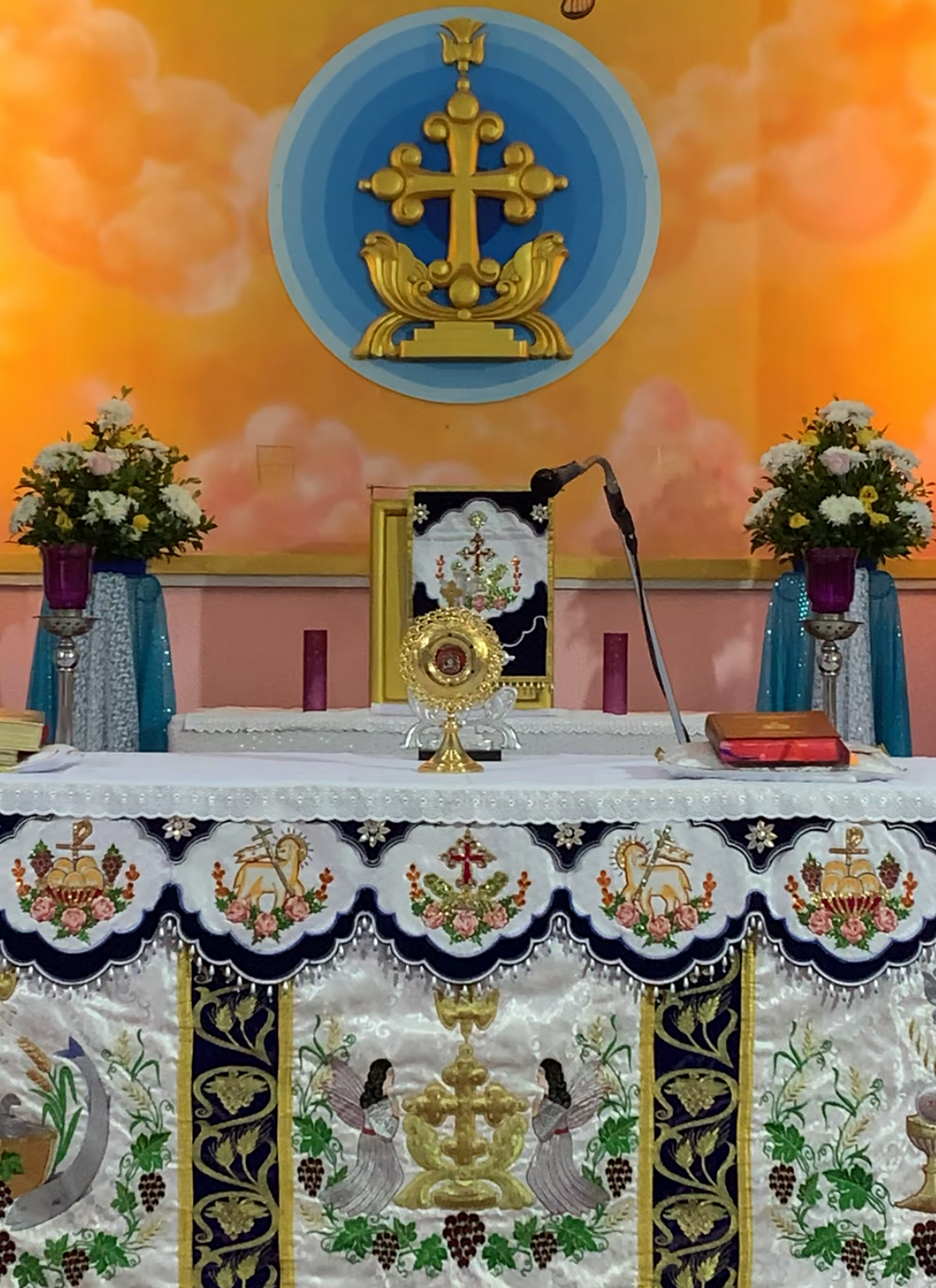
Relics of St. Maurus in Koothrapally Church

Worldwide, he is the patron of charcoalburners and coppersmiths.

The Blessing of Saint Maur is customarily bestowed on the sick with a relic of the true Cross, in hopes of assisting to restore their health. Since it is often impossible to have a relic of the True Cross, in 1959, the Sacred Congregation of Rites granted permission to use the medal of St. Benedict in place of the relic of the True Cross to confer the Blessing.

The Congregation of St. Maur took its name from him. The surname "Seymour" is derived from Saint Maur.

Saint Maur International School of Yokohama, Japan's first international school, was founded by French and Irish nuns of the Congregation of the Infant Jesus (also known as the Dames of Saint Maur) in 1872, and was named after Saint Maur.

=== Iconography ===
In Christian iconography, Maurus is depicted as a young man in the habit of a Benedictine monk, usually holding an abbot's pectoral cross or sometimes with a spade (an allusion to the monastery of Saint-Maur-des-Fossés, literally "Saint Maurus of the Ditches"). Another of Maurus' attributes is a crutch, in reference to his patronage of disabled people. He was invoked especially against fever, and also against rheumatism, epilepsy, and gout. He is also sometimes depicted with a scale, a reference to the implement used to measure a monk's daily ration of bread, which Benedict gave him when he left Montecassino for France. The monks of Fossés, near Paris (from which the community of Glanfeuil had fled the Vikings in 868), used this implement throughout the Middle Ages.

== See also ==
- Diocese of Saint Maurus
- Saint Maurus, patron saint archive
- Saint-Maur Abbey
- St Mary's Syro Malabar Catholic Church, Koothrapally

== Sources ==
- Gardner, Edmund G., ed. (1911). The Dialogues of Saint Gregory the Great. Merchantville, NJ: Evolution Publishing. ISBN 978-1-889758-94-7.
- Rosa Giorgi; Stefano Zuffi (ed.), Saints in Art (Los Angeles: Getty Publications, 2003), 272.
- John B. Wickstrom: "Text and Image in the Making of a Holy Man: An Illustrated Life of Saint Maurus of Glanfeuil (MS Vat. Lat. 1202)," Studies in Iconography 14(1994), 53–85.
- Ibid. The Life and Miracles of St. Maurus: Disciple of Benedict, Apostle to France (Kalamazoo, Cistercian Publications, 2008).
