= Samart =

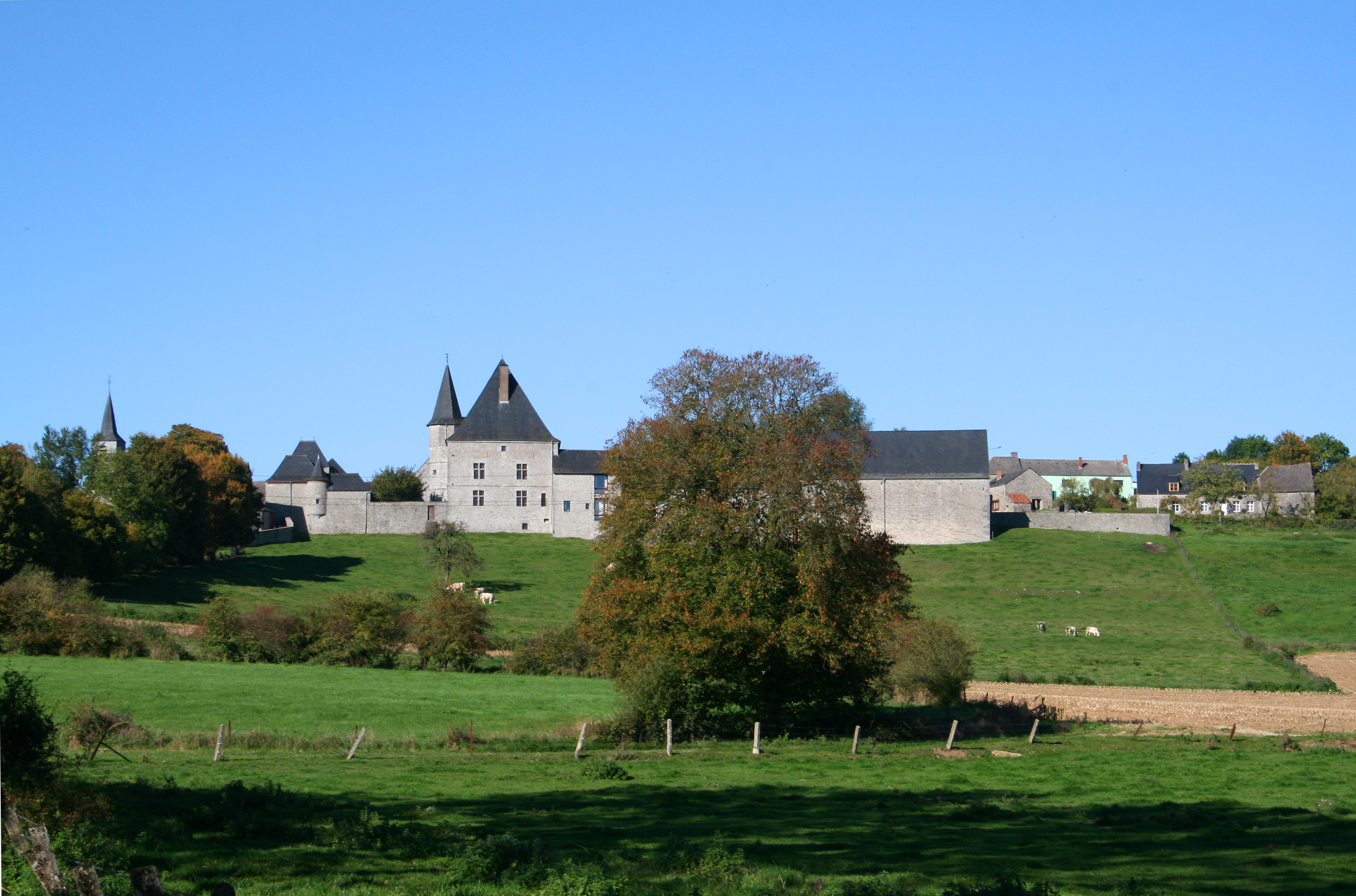
- Samart

- Location within Belgium Location within Europe
- Coordinates: 50°10′39″N 04°31′59″E
- Country: Belgium
- Region: Wallonia
- Province: Namur
- Municipality: Philippeville

Samart is a village of Wallonia in the municipality of Philippeville, located in the province of Namur, Belgium.

The name derives from the patron saint of the village, Saint-Mard or Saint-Médard. A knight hailing from Saint-Médard is mentioned in archives in 1090, the earliest written evidence of the locality. The village was the property of the same family throughout the Middle Ages, until the 16th century. The village is still dominated by the fortified manor, the Château-ferme de Samart.
