= Château-ferme de Roly =

Fortified farmhouse in Wallonia, Belgium

Coordinates: 50.134°N 4.537°E

Roly Castle
- Wallonia, Belgium
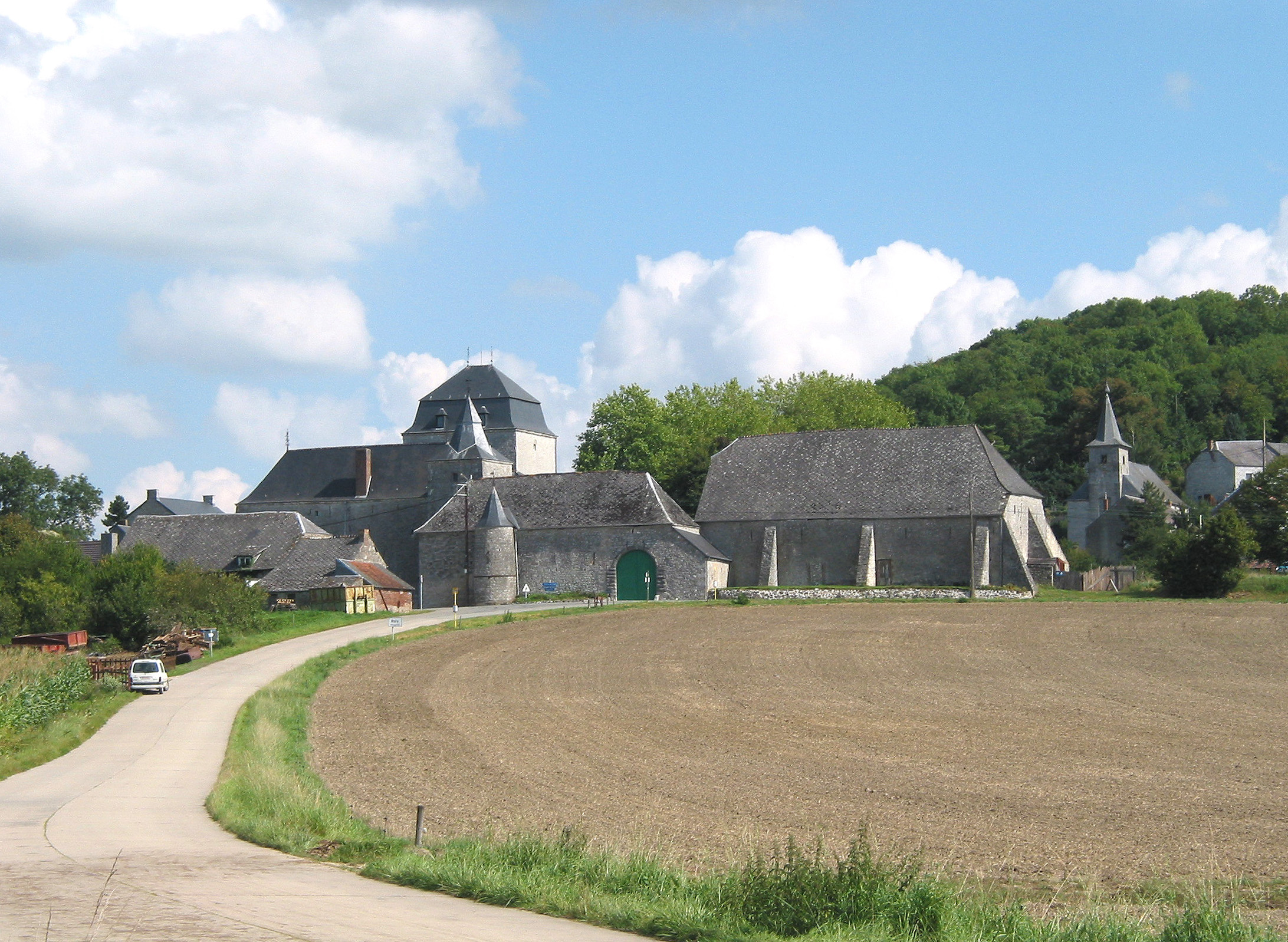

Site information
- Type: Castle

Roly Castle (French: Château-ferme de Roly) is a château-ferme, or fortified farmhouse, in Roly in the municipality of Philippeville, province of Namur, Wallonia, Belgium.

The existence of a fortification, in the form of a tower, is recorded here as early as 1069, but the present donjon dates from the 13th century, and this is the oldest extant part of the buildings. Major restorations and reconstructions took place in 1616 and between 1746 and 1749, and as of 2010 the buildings are again undergoing restoration.

Besides the donjon, the castle contains extensive domestic ranges and numerous service and outbuildings. The whole complex is surrounded on two sides by moats.

The castle also contains a private chapel, dedicated to Saint Anthony.

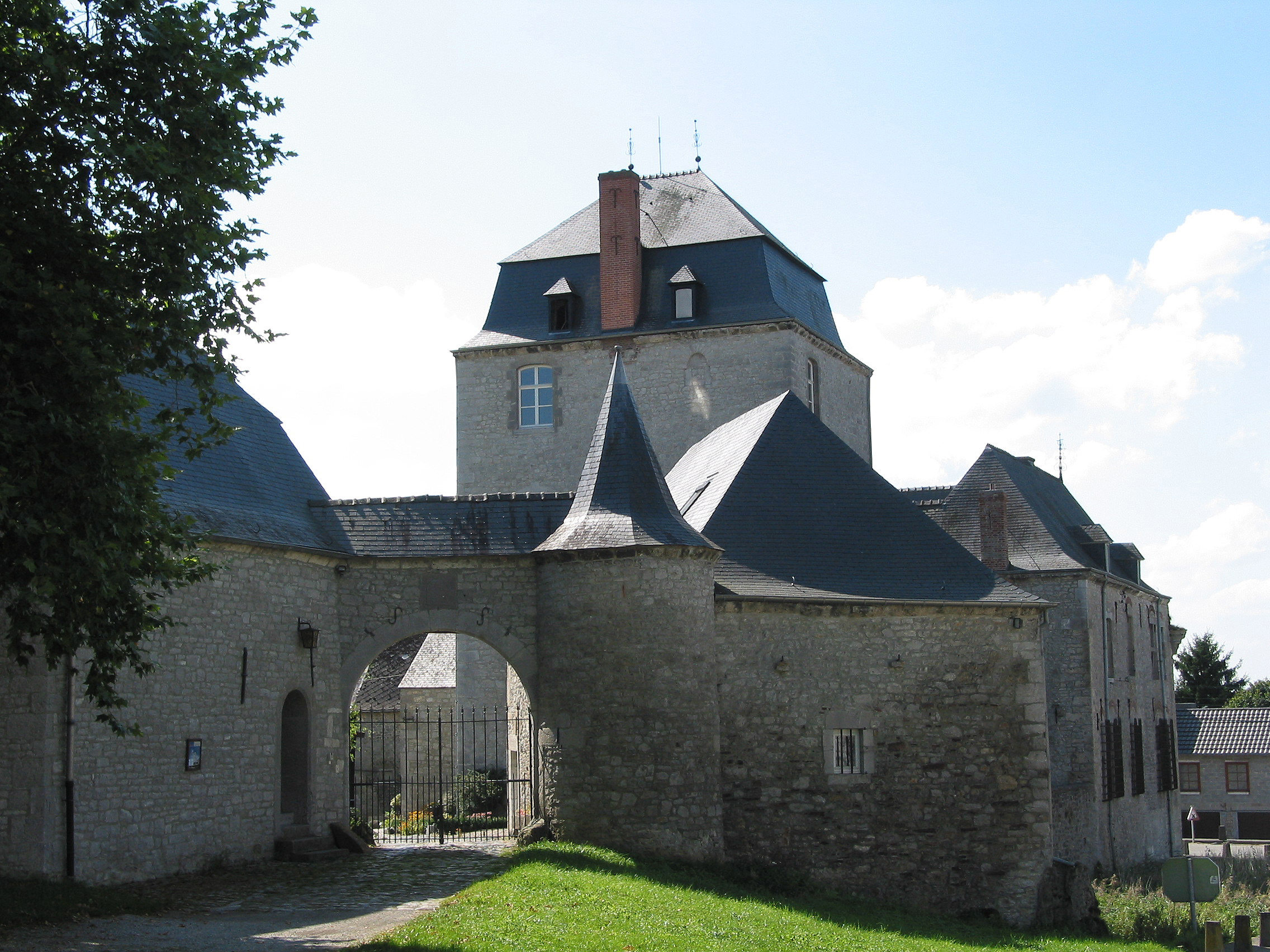
The castle, showing the donjon

== See also ==
- List of castles in Belgium
