= Château-ferme de Samart =

Fortified farmhouse in Wallonia, Belgium

Coordinates: 50.177°N 4.535°E

Samart Castle
- Wallonia, Belgium
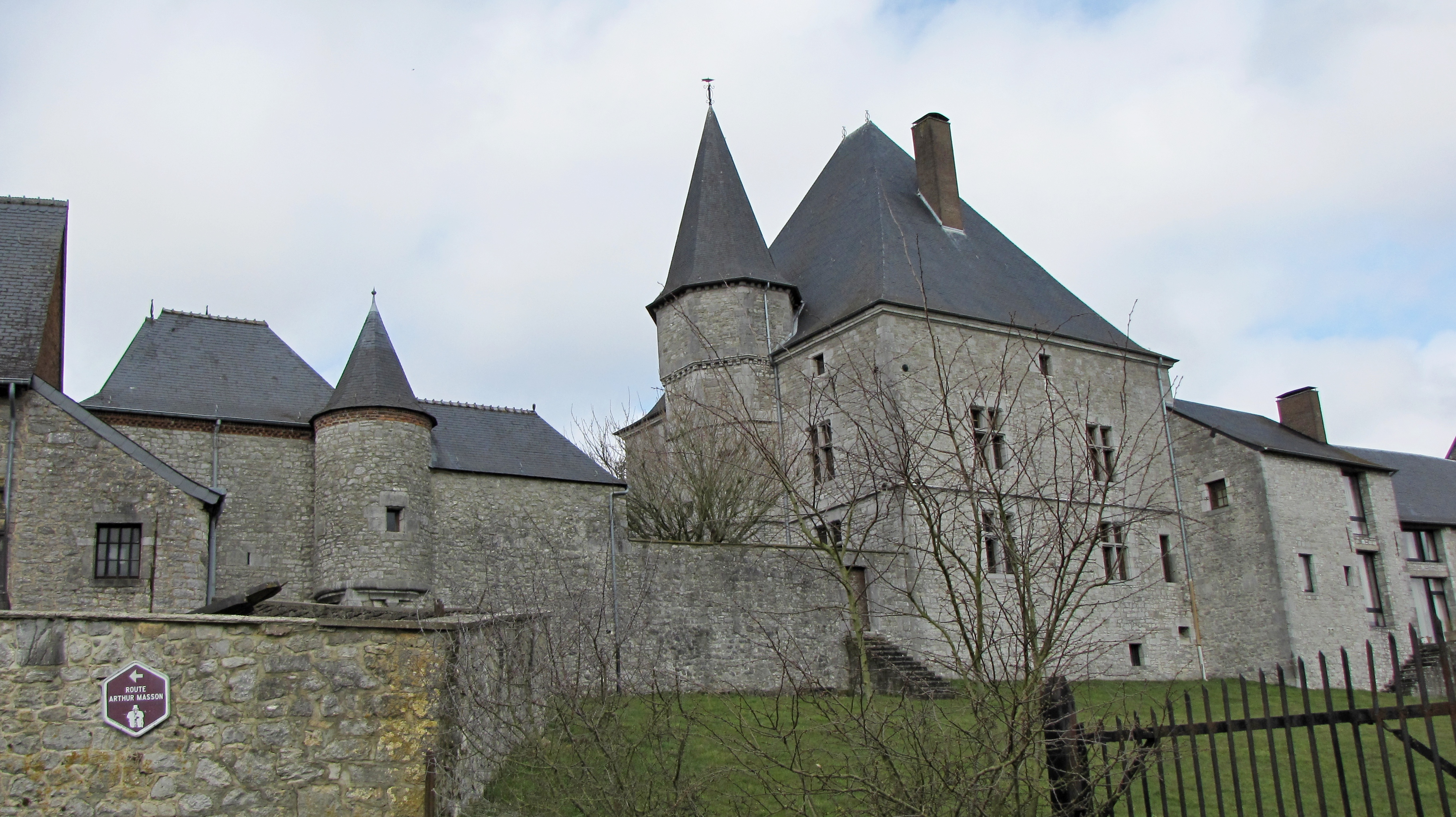

Site information
- Type: Castle

Samart Castle (French: Château-ferme de Samart) is a château-ferme, or fortified farmhouse, in Samart in the municipality of Philippeville, province of Namur, Wallonia, Belgium.

Extensive renovations during the 16th and 17th centuries left only the watchtower of the original structure intact.

== See also ==
- List of castles in Belgium
