= Fagnolle Castle =

Ruined castle in Wallonia, Belgium

Coordinates: 50.109°N 4.565°E

- Wallonia, Belgium
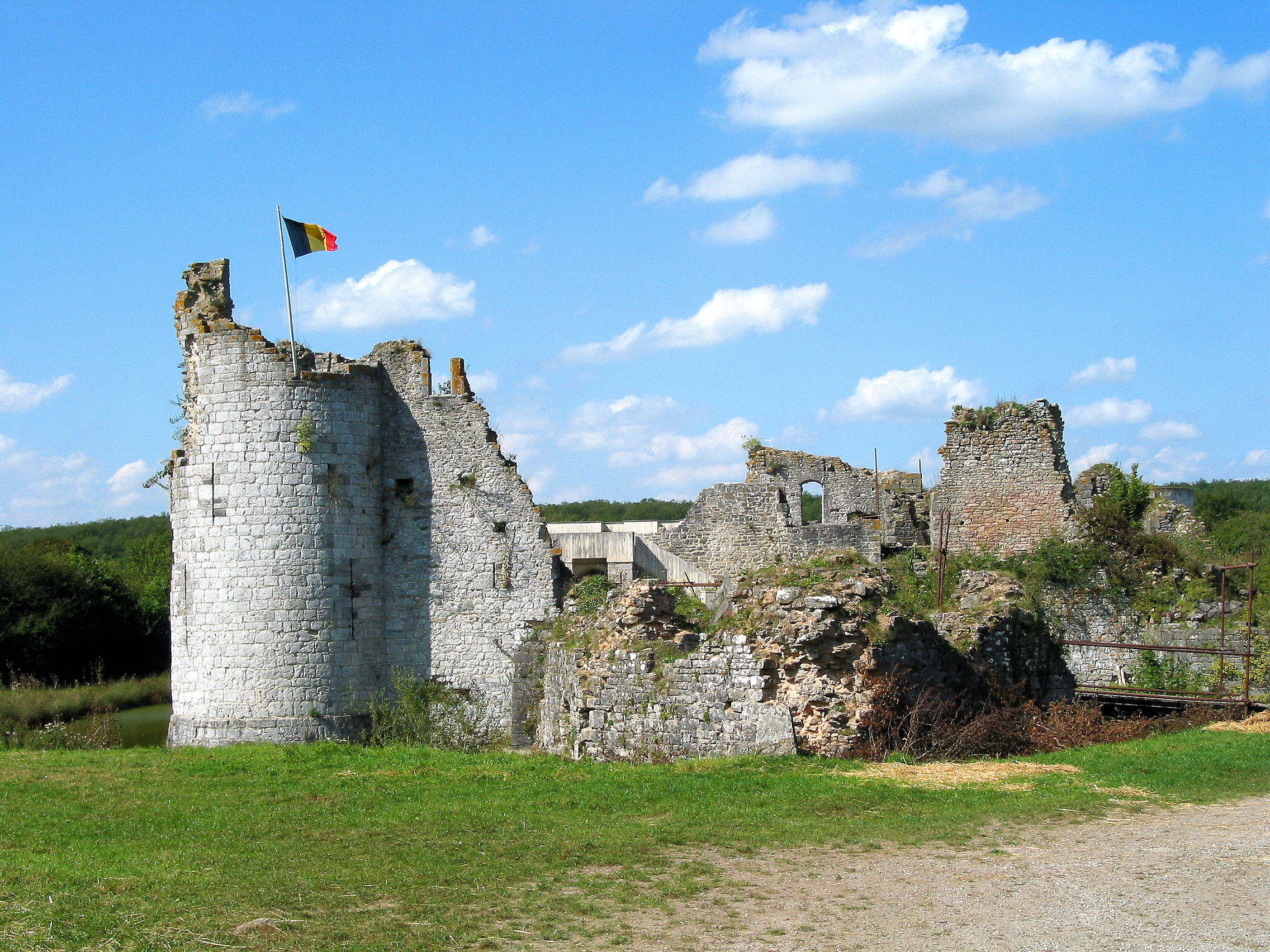

Site information
- Type: Castle
- Condition: ruined

Site history
- Built: 12th century

Fagnolle Castle (French: Château de Fagnolle) is a castle located in the district of Fagnolle, in the municipality of Philippeville, Wallonia, Belgium, and in the Fagne region. The castle was formerly the centre of government of the small independent Barony, later County, of Fagnolle. It was constructed in the 12th century, and is now ruined.

== See also ==
- List of castles in Belgium
