= Reliquary of St. Maurus =

Reliquary exhibited in Bečov nad Teplou, Czech Republic

Coordinates: 50°5′9.18″N 12°50′22.84″E

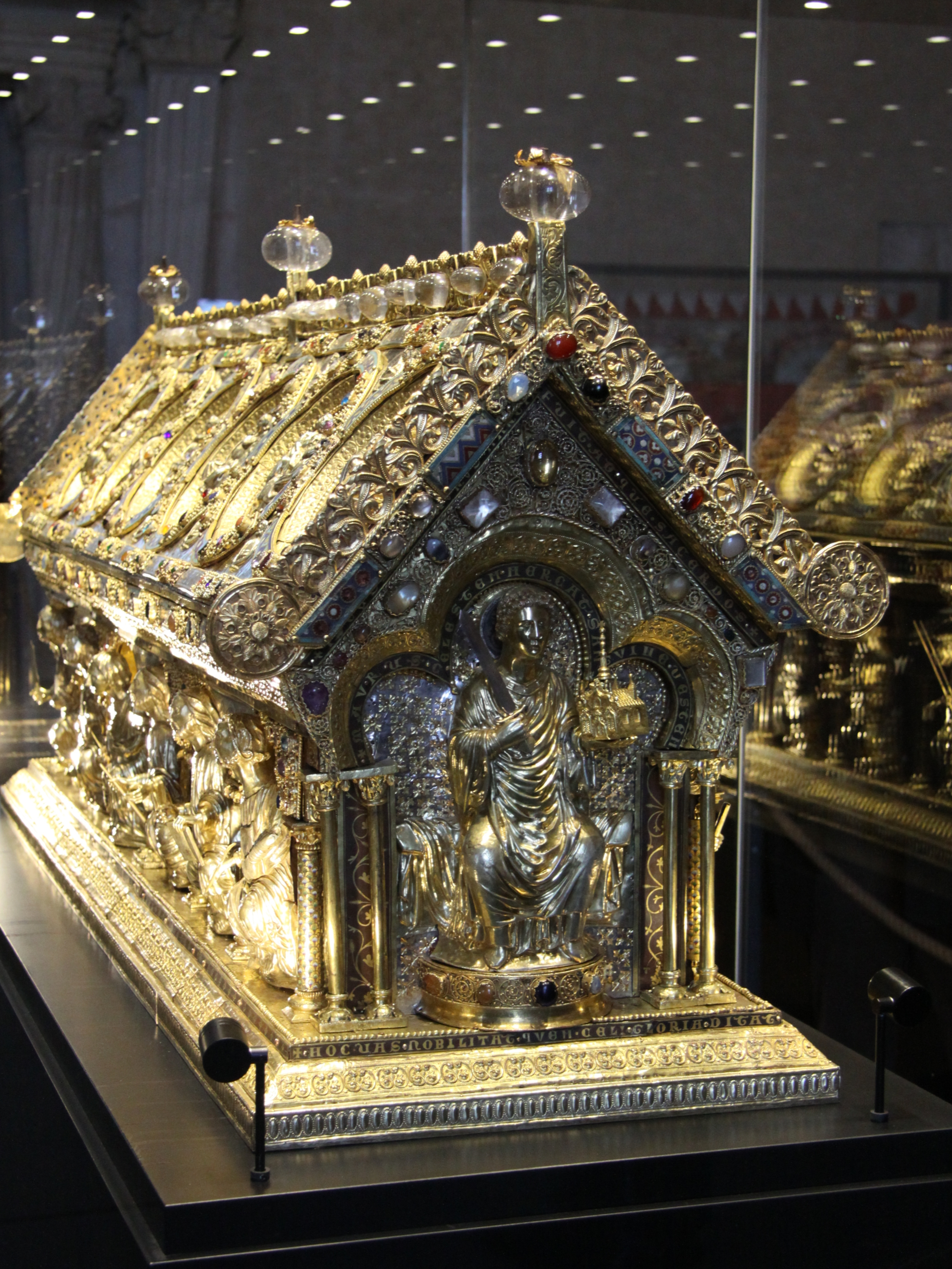
View along the reliquary

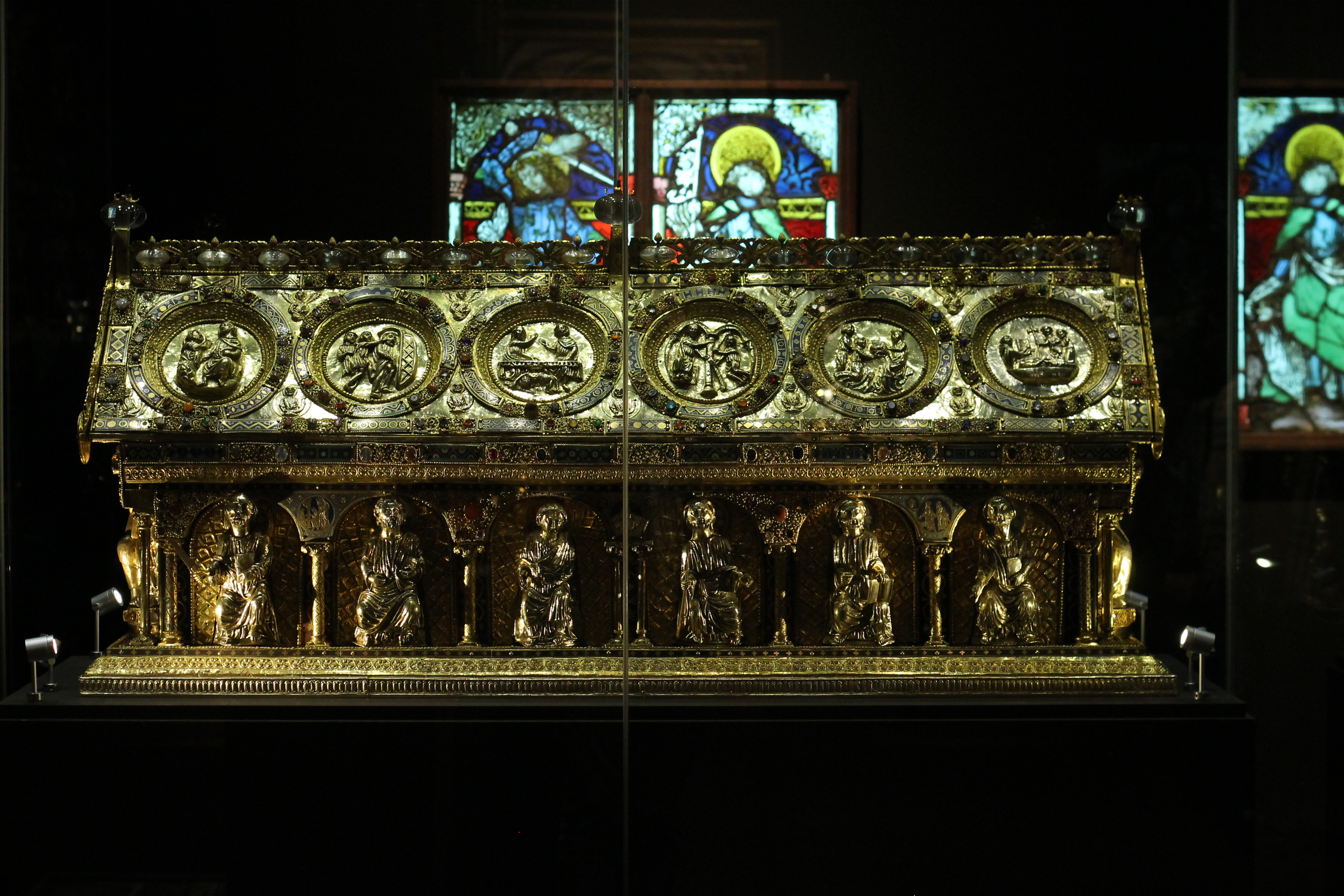
Reliquary at the 2015 exhibition in Prague Castle

Reliquary of St. Maurus (Czech: relikviář svatého Maura) is a Romanesque reliquary, an example of Mosan art made in modern Belgium, and now exhibited in the castle of Bečov nad Teplou in the west of the Czech Republic. It is considered to be the second most important historical artifact in the Czech territory after the Czech Crown Jewels.

The reliquary is a large chasse, or house-shaped casket, with a wooden structure covered by silver-gilt plates, with 12 small high relief figures of saints, elaborate Romanesque metalwork ornamentation, and a number of gems, including engraved gems from earlier periods. It is presumed to house some remains attributed to Saint John the Baptist, Saint Timothy, with remains of Saint Maurus added later.

== History ==
The reliquary was created for Florennes Abbey in Belgium in the first quarter of the 13th century to hold the purported skeletal remains of Saints Maurus, John the Baptist and Timothy. The wooden core is covered with gilded silver plate with many statuettes, reliefs, filigree decorations and gems. After the sacking of Florennes the reliquary was placed in the local church and later bought by Duke Alfred de Beaufort-Spontin in 1838. The Duke restored the damaged artifact and loaned it to the Antwerp International Exposition (1885). By 1888, the Beauforts transported it to their castle estate in Bečov.

The house of Beaufort cooperated with the Nazi Party during World War II and was forced to leave the country in 1945. Shortly before the end of the war, the reliquary was buried beneath the floor in the chapel and effectively forgotten. In 1984, American businessman Danny Douglas approached Czechoslovak authorities (via the embassy in Vienna) with an offer to pay 250,000 USD for the right to excavate and export abroad an otherwise unidentified object “which nobody here misses anyway”. From the fragments of information provided, the authorities initiated a search operation to verify the nature of the "object" and find it.

This operation was led by František Maryška, the head of Federal investigation bureau at that time. From the fragments of information provided his team was able to narrow the investigation to 5 possible locations and 3 weeks before the business was to be performed they were able to identify that the "object" must be located in Bečov Castle or surrounding area. Police officers arrived to the location with a large team of men and with metal detectors and were searching all the surroundings, digging several holes in garden and outside the castle. Since the weather was bad and Douglas was not worried about snow or frozen earth they concluded that the object must be inside. So they started with the search inside on places where a hidden room was anticipated or where such an object might fit. When searching the floor in the old castle chapel they identified that a large metallic object was below and after removing the wooden boards they discovered the St. Maurus reliquary on 5 November 1985.

== Restoration ==
The reliquary had decayed significantly after its decades of burial. The Czech authorities, after refusing to allow the relic's export and working to resolve ownership disputes, began an extensive restoration which lasted from 1991 by restorers from the Museum of Decorative Arts in Prague and preservation experts from the German town of Aachen. The restoration was complete in 2002 and the artifact was then returned to Bečov. The shrine has since been on public display in both the Bečov Castle and Prague Castle.
