= Florennes Abbey =

Coordinates: 50°15′10″N 4°35′55″E

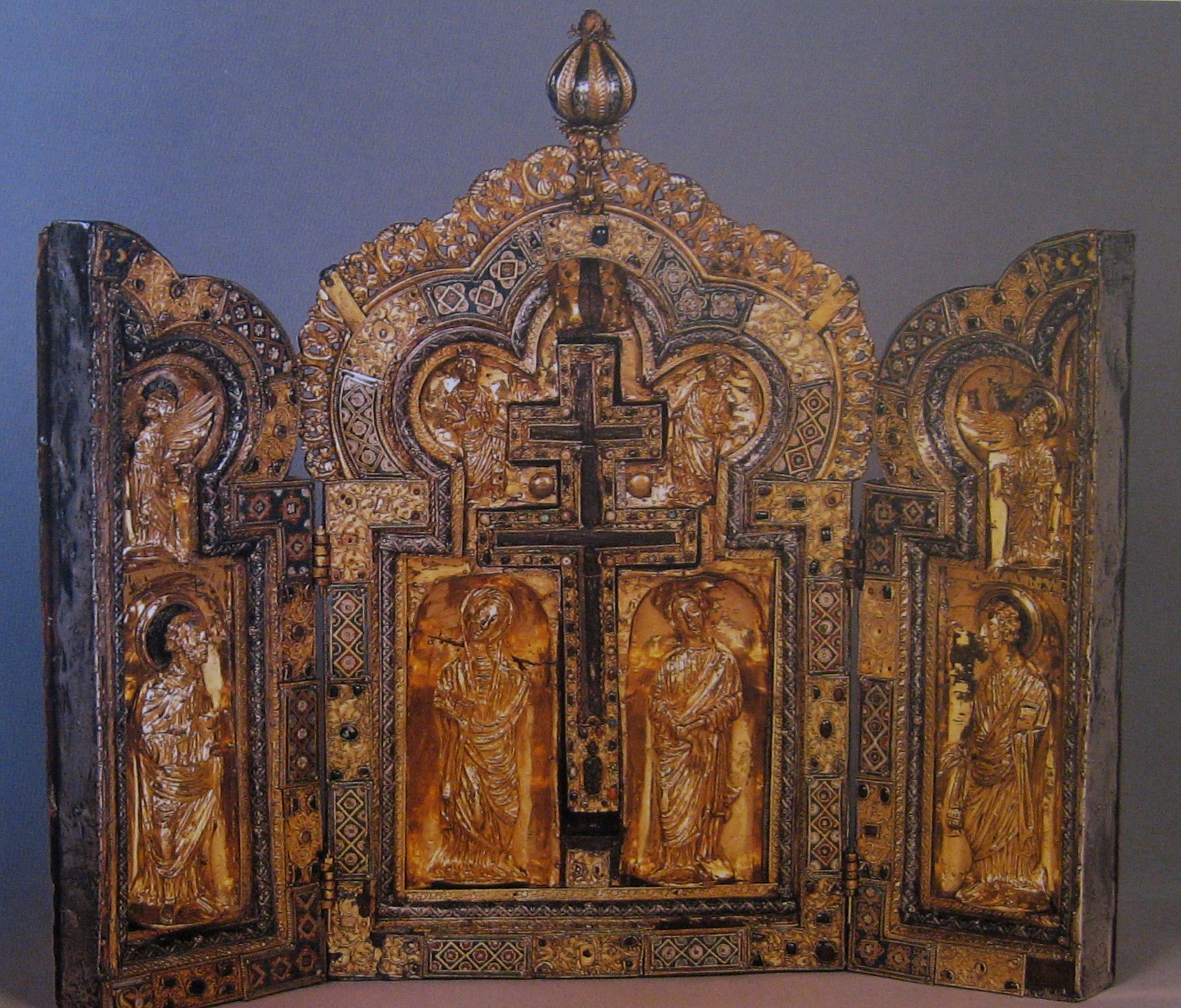
Triptych of Florennes Abbey in the Musée du Cinquantenaire, Brussels

Florennes Abbey (French: Abbaye de Florennes) is a former Benedictine monastery in Florennes, province of Namur, Wallonia, Belgium. The abbey was founded in the 11th century, but has left very few visible remains.

== History ==
A community of canons led by Gerard, a canon of Reims Cathedral and son of the lord of Florennes, established themselves here in about 1010 and were given the spiritual care of the collegiate church (then a dependency of the principality of Liège). Towards 1025, the community accepted the Rule of St. Benedict and became a Benedictine monastery; 1027 is considered its year of foundation.

The abbey was important in the region. It was particularly associated with the de Rumigny family. It was dissolved during the French Revolution, and afterwards entirely demolished.

== Present day ==
=== Structures ===
On the site, only the former abbey farm remains, on the outskirts of Florennes on the road leading to Morialmé, with a tower characteristic of the 17th century (perhaps originally a dovecote).

Three bas-reliefs from the former abbey church, including one of Saint Michael, are now at Maredsous Abbey.

=== Artworks ===
The abbey triptych, dating from 1200 to 1210, is now in the Musée du Cinquantenaire in Brussels.

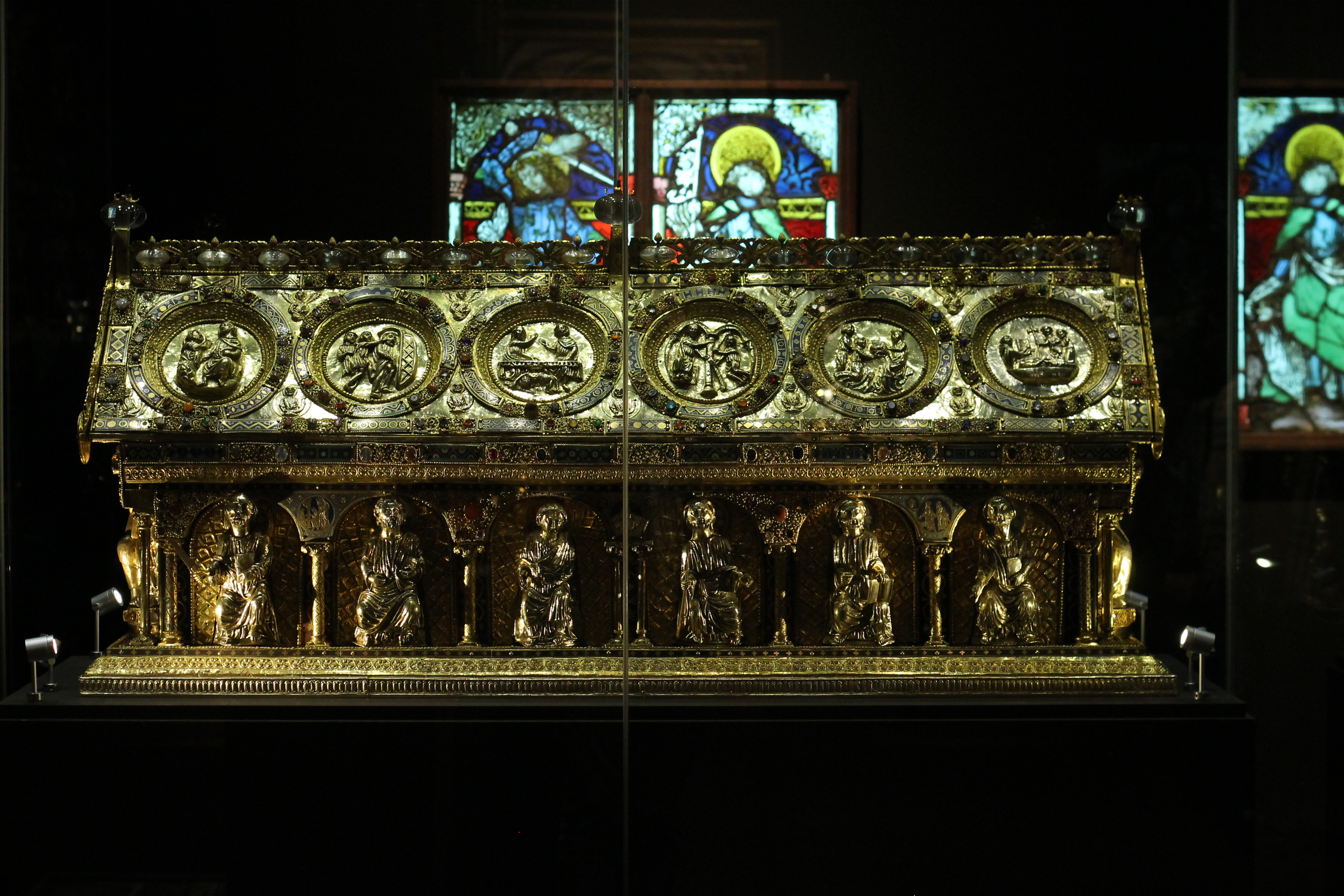
Reliquary of St. Maurus, in Petschau Castle (Czech Republic)

The Reliquary of St. Maurus, a masterpiece of Mosan goldsmith's work from the early 13th century, was saved in a nearby church when the abbey was destroyed in the French Revolution. It was bought in 1838 by Alfred, duc de Beaufort-Spontin, and some decades later moved to Petschau Castle (now Bečov nad Teplou in the present Czech Republic), one of the family's residences. When the castle was evacuated during World War II, the reliquary was buried for safe-keeping under the floor of the chapel, and forgotten. It was rediscovered in 1985, and remains in the hands of the Czech government.

== Bibliography ==
- Dierkens, Alain, 1984: Abbayes et chapitres entre Sambre et Meuse (VIIe – XIe siècles): Contribution à l'histoire religieuse des campagnes du Haut Moyen Âge (375 p). Sigmaringen: Jan Thorbecke ISBN 3-7995-7314-3 (online edition)
