= Philippeville =

City in Namur Province, Wallonia, Belgium

Philippeville Flipveye (Walloon)
- Municipality
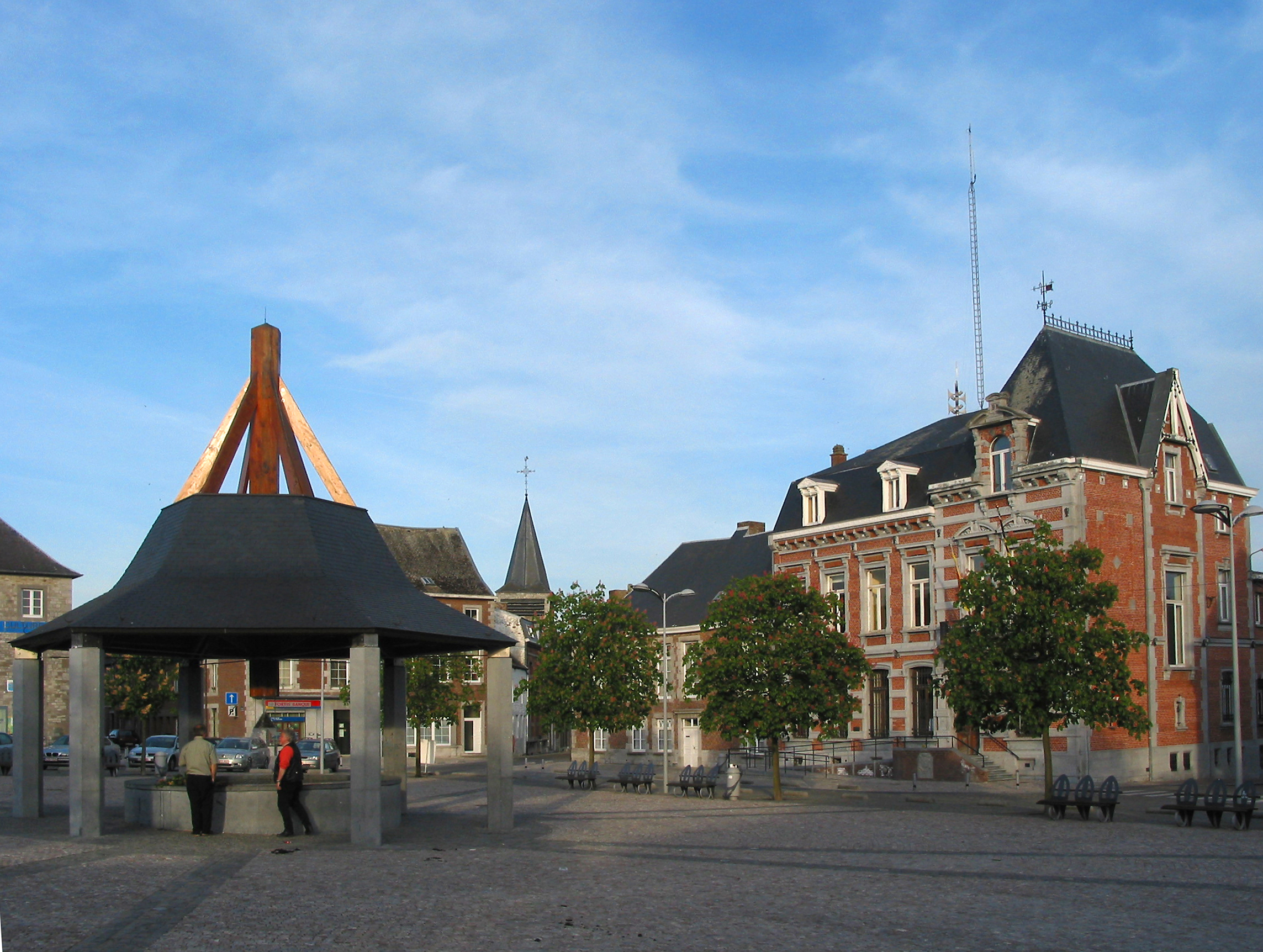
- Philippeville's main square

- Flag Coat of arms

- Location of Philippeville in the province of Namur
- Interactive map of Philippeville
- Location in Belgium
- Coordinates: 50°12′N 04°33′E
- Country: Belgium
- Community: French Community
- Region: Wallonia
- Province: Namur
- Arrondissement: Philippeville

Government
  - Mayor: André De Martin (PS, Agir Ensemble)
  - Governing party: Agir Ensemble-MR

Area
  - Total: 157.35 km^{2} (60.75 sq mi)

Population (2018-01-01)
  - Total: 9,228
  - Density: 58.65/km^{2} (151.9/sq mi)
- Postal codes: 5600
- NIS code: 93056
- Area codes: 071
- Website: www.philippeville.be

Philippeville (French pronunciation: [filipvil]; Walloon: Flipveye) is a city and municipality of Wallonia located in the province of Namur, Belgium. The Philippeville municipality includes the former municipalities of Fagnolle, Franchimont, Jamagne, Jamiolle, Merlemont, Neuville, Omezée, Roly, Romedenne, Samart, Sart-en-Fagne, Sautour, Surice, Villers-en-Fagne, Villers-le-Gambon, and Vodecée.

== History ==
=== The foundation of Philippeville ===
At the beginning of the 16th century, the Philippeville region was on the boundary between Charles V's Burgundian Netherlands and Francis I's France. Fighting around Philippeville did not start, however, until 1554, after Henry II had succeeded his father on the throne. This area was ideal for an attack as it was covered with forests, sparsely populated and divided among the County of Hainaut, that of Namur, by now part of Burgundy, and the Prince-Bishopric of Liège. The medieval forts in the area were taken and pillaged one after the other. The fortress of Mariembourg, close to Couvin, and the town of Givet soon fell to the French. In 1555, Charles V's new commander, William the Silent, established a new fort in the village of Echerennes, a village known since the 9th century. He garrisoned his troops there as soon as the fort was completed, barely four months after the start of construction.

In 1556, Charles V named his new fortress Philippeville in honour of his son, Philip II of Spain, who would succeed him in the Netherlands – and on the city – the following year.

=== From 1557 to present ===
In 1659, the Treaty of the Pyrenees stopped the Franco-Spanish War (1635–59) and most frontier cities became French, until Napoleon's defeat at Waterloo. Philippeville itself was one of the final French fortresses to surrender following Waterloo in 1815. There was then a brief Dutch interlude until the Belgian Revolution in 1830.

A treaty drafted in London on 15 November 1831, which the Netherlands refused to sign, was followed by the Treaty of London (1839), which created the Kingdom of Belgium. Part of the terms of the treaty required the Philippeville's fortifications, along with those of Menin, Ath, Mons and Mariembourg, to be dismantled. Philippeville's defensive walls were dismantled in 1856 under the reign of King Leopold I, in accordance with the terms of the treaty, having been declared superfluous on account of Belgium's enforced neutrality, and have been replaced by the wide boulevards that circle the city today.

== Sights ==
- Ten kilometres of underground passages dating from the foundation of the city can still be explored under Philippeville. Some sections are open to tourists.

== Born in Philippeville ==
- Jérôme-Joseph de Momigny, a noted composer and musicologist of the classical/romantic period, was born here on 20 January 1762.

== Twin cities ==
- France: Saulieu
