= Krásno (Sokolov District) =

- Town
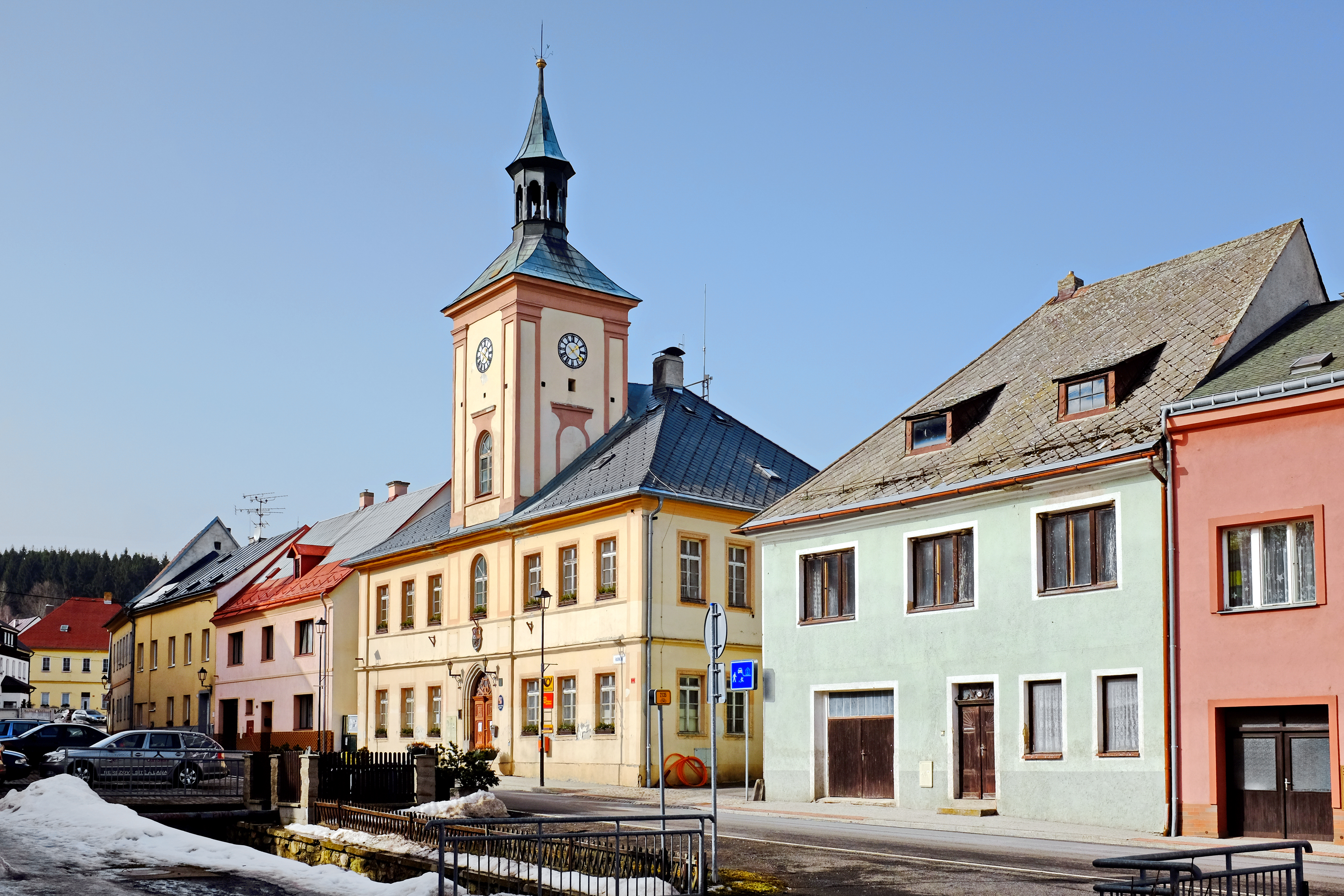
- Town hall

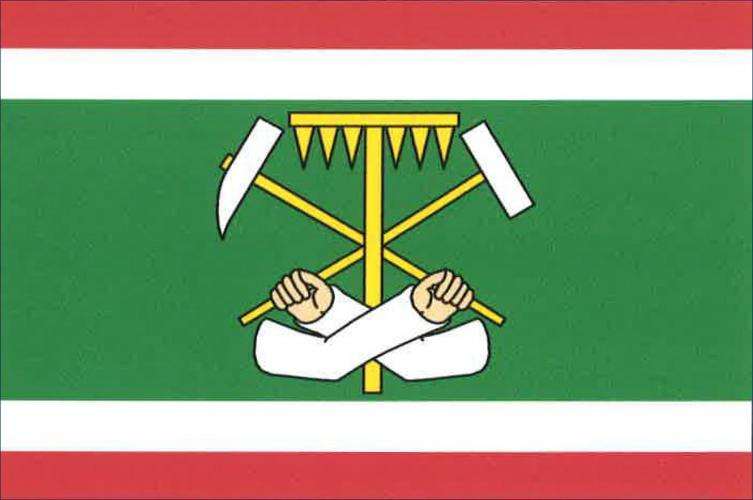
- Flag Coat of arms

- Location in the Czech Republic
- Coordinates: 50°6′30″N 12°48′19″E
- Country: Czech Republic
- Region: Karlovy Vary
- District: Sokolov
- First mentioned: 1241

Government
  - Mayor: Josef Havel

Area
  - Total: 25.36 km^{2} (9.79 sq mi)
- Elevation: 688 m (2,257 ft)

Population (2026-01-01)
  - Total: 712
  - Density: 28.1/km^{2} (72.7/sq mi)
- Time zone: UTC+1 (CET)
  - Summer (DST): UTC+2 (CEST)
- Postal codes: 357 31, 357 47
- Website: www.mesto-krasno.cz

Krásno (Czech pronunciation: [ˈkraːsno]; until 1947 Schönfeld) is a town in Sokolov District in the Karlovy Vary Region of the Czech Republic. It has about 700 inhabitants. The town is historically associated with tin mining.

== Etymology ==
The former German name Schönfeld, which was also used in Czech, means 'beautiful field'. In this case, 'field' was probably a designation of the mining area. In 1947, the town was renamed from Schönfeld to its current name (from krásný = 'beautiful').

== Geography ==
Krásno is located about 11 kilometres (7 mi) southeast of Sokolov and 15 km (9 mi) southwest of Karlovy Vary. It lies in the Slavkov Forest. The highest point is the hill Špičák at 829 m (2,720 ft) above sea level. The Teplá River briefly crosses the eastern part of the municipal territory.

== History ==
The first written mention of Krásno (under the name Schönfeld) is in a book of Bartholomaeus Anglicus from 1241. In 1355, the village was promoted to a market town and obtained mining privileges. Tin mines were located in the area. In 1529, the settlement became a town and in 1547, it was promoted to a royal mining town by Emperor Ferdinand I. At the end of the 16th century, tin production declined and although it was renewed several times, it ended in the 19th century. Instead, porcelain production developed in the town. The large 1848 fire destroyed most of the town, including many monuments.

After World War II, the German-speaking population was expelled and Krásno ceased to be a town. Population decline and the declaration of a military area in the Slavkov Forest led to the degradation of the municipality. In the 20th century, tin, tungsten and uranium ores and feldspars were mined here. In 2007, the town status was restored.

== Demographics ==
Historical population

Year	Pop.	±%
1869	4,173	—
1880	4,230	+1.4%
1890	4,141	−2.1%
1900	3,996	−3.5%
1910	3,445	−13.8%

Year	Pop.	±%
1921	3,110	−9.7%
1930	2,927	−5.9%
1950	1,234	−57.8%
1961	1,085	−12.1%
1970	784	−27.7%

Year	Pop.	±%
1980	552	−29.6%
1991	557	+0.9%
2001	652	+17.1%
2011	724	+11.0%
2021	667	−7.9%

Source: Censuses

== Transport ==
The I/20 road (part of the European route E49) from Plzeň to Karlovy Vary runs through the eastern part of the municipal territory.

The railway line from Karlovy Vary to Mariánské Lázně also briefly crosses the eastern part of the territory. Krásno is served by the train stations in neighbouring Bečov nad Teplou.

== Sights ==
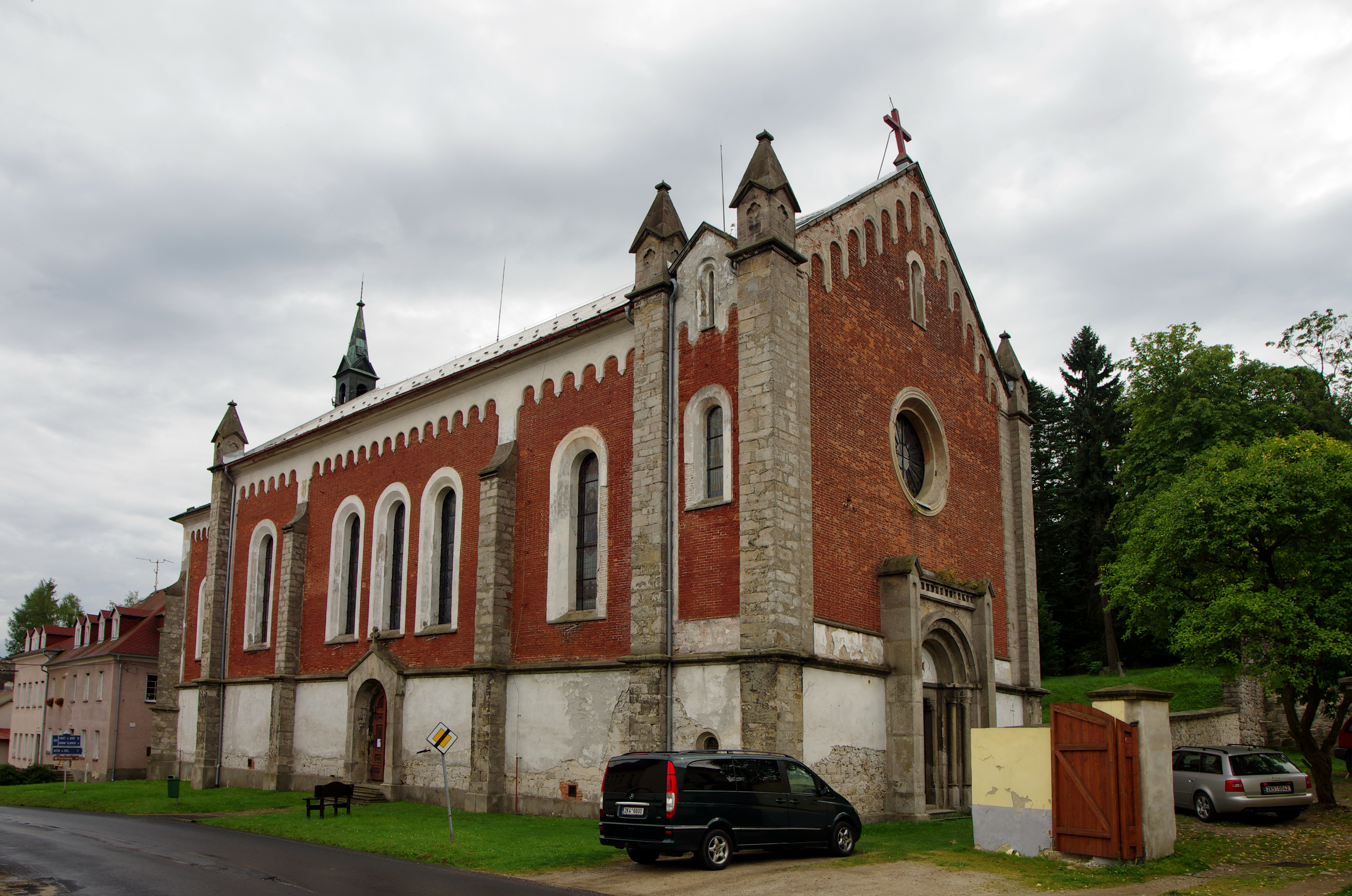
Church of Saint Catherine of Alexandria

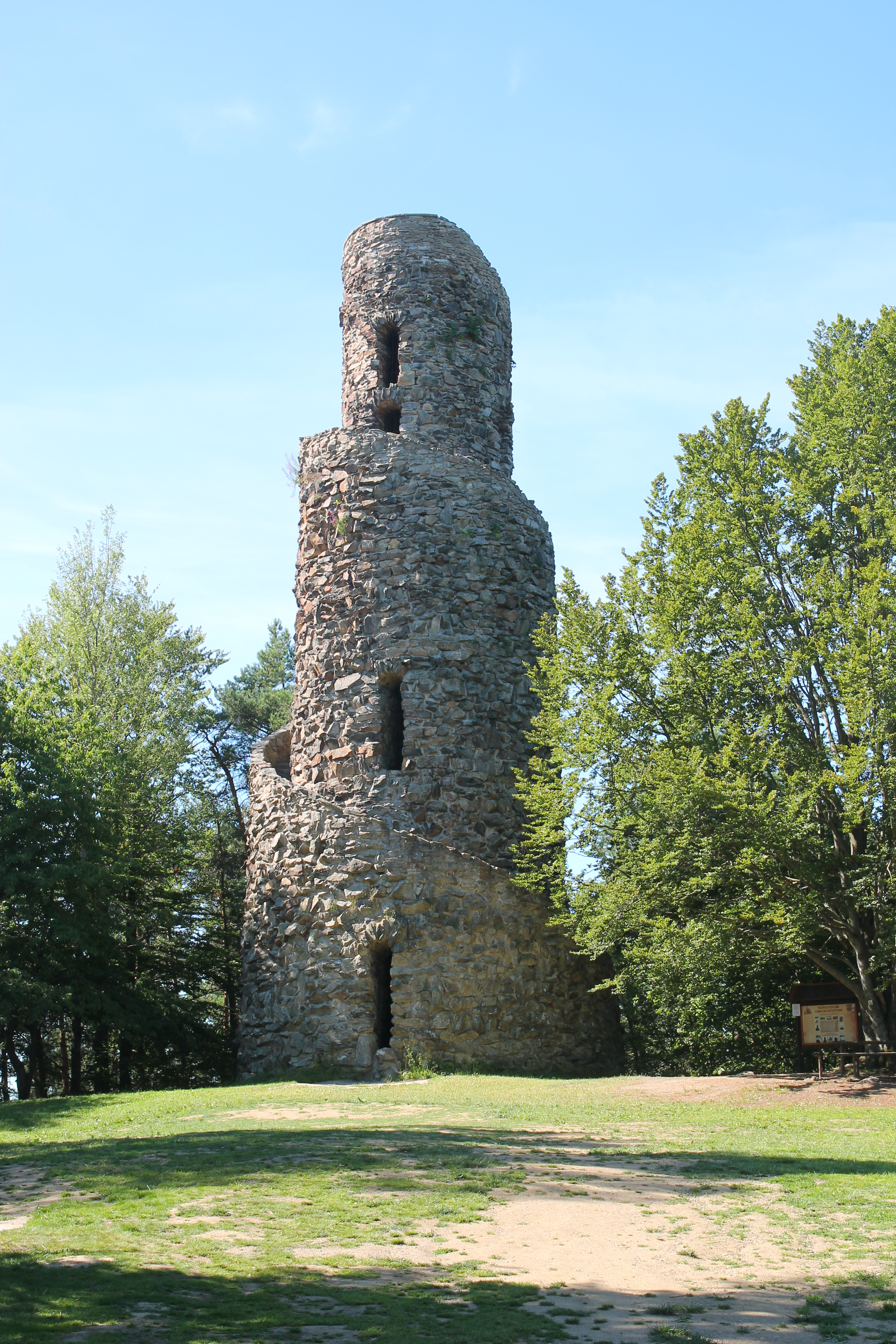
The observation tower Krásenský vrch

The town hall was built in the Neoclassical style in 1852, on the foundations of a Renaissance house from 1601. It has a Gothic portal from the first half of the 16th century.

The second notable landmark of the centre of Krásno is the Church of Saint Catherine of Alexandria. It was built in the neo-Romanesque style in 1858–1859. It replaced an old medieval church, destroyed by the 1848 fire. Near the church is a separate bell tower. It consists of a brick Renaissance foundation from the 16th century and a newer wooden floor.

A cultural monument is a stone observation tower called Krásenský vrch, situated on the hill Na Vyhlídce above the town. It was built in 1933–1935 and was inspired by oriental buildings, especially the Tower of Babel. It is 25 m (82 ft) high and has a spiral staircase outside the building.

The most important monument, protected as a national cultural monument, is the artificial water channel called Dlouhá stoka. It leads from Krásno to Lázně Kynžvart. It was built in 1531–1536 and was used to supply water to mines and to float timber. It is an important landscape feature that is a testament to the glorious era of tin mining in the area. Another notable tin mining monument is the Vilém mine complex. It was built in 1915 and most of the technology from that time has been preserved. Today there is a mining museum.

== Notable people ==
- Johann Caspar Ferdinand Fischer (c. 1656 – 1746), German composer
- Joseph Labitzky (1802–1881), composer

== Twin towns – sister cities ==
Krásno is twinned with:

- Bischofsgrün, Germany
