= Friedrich Gustav Schlick =

German painter and engraver

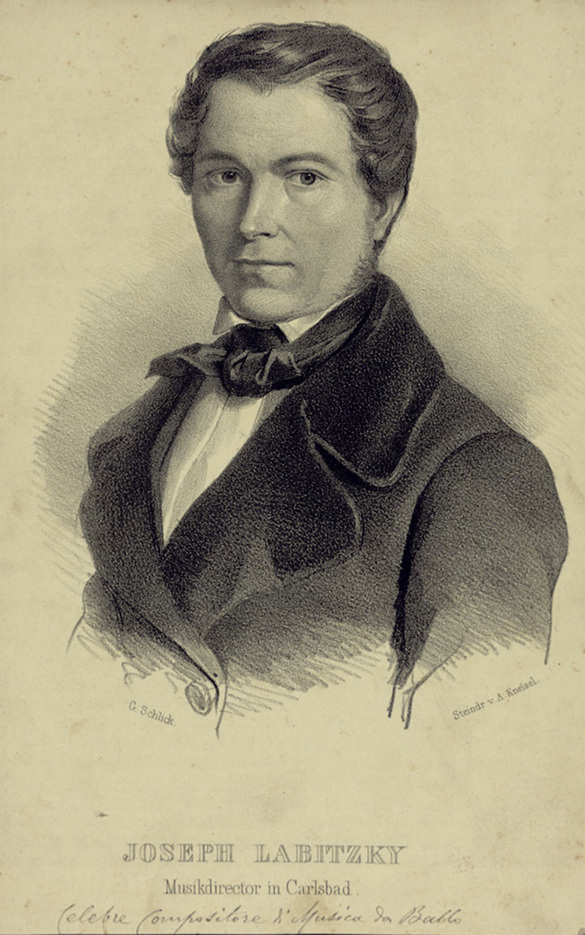
Czech composer Joseph Labitzky as portrayed by Schlick

Friedrich Gustav Schlick (1804 – 6 September 1869) was a German painter and engraver.
