= Joseph Labitzky =

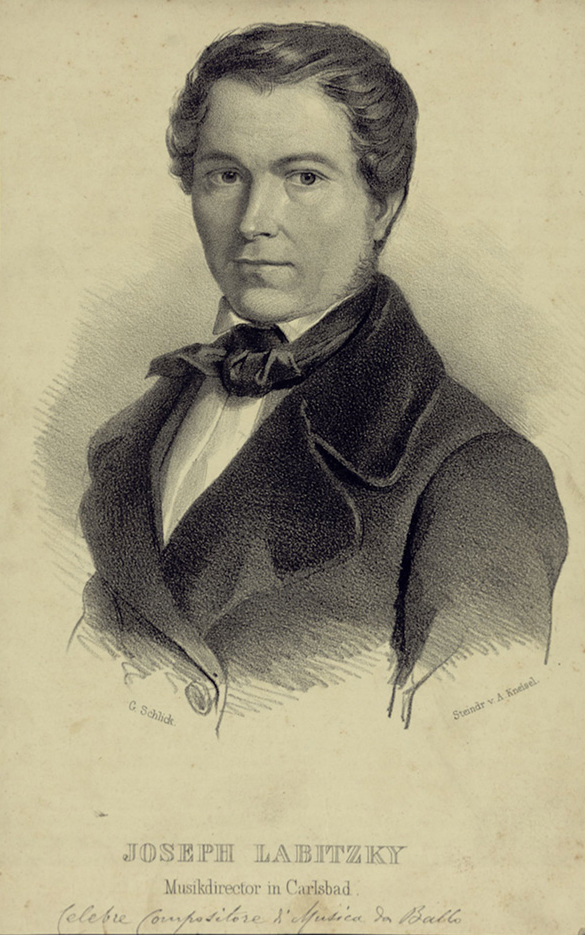
Friedrich Gustav Schlick's portrait of Joseph Labitzky

Joseph Labitzky (Czech: Josef Labický; 4 July 1802 in Krásno – 18 August 1881 in Karlovy Vary) was a Bohemian composer, violinist, and conductor. He studied with Karl Veit in his youth. Labitzky joined a traveling orchestra at age 14, and in 1820 took a position in an orchestra in Marienbad. In 1823–24, he was in Munich, and following this he toured Germany as a concert violinist. He put together his own orchestra in 1825, touring Vienna and Warsaw. He took a conducting position in Karlsbad in 1835, and his dance pieces became quite popular throughout Europe, including England. He was involved in "Cocks vs Purday", a British court case concerning copyright. He was the father of August Labitzky. Labitzky composed 300 dance pieces.

He was overshadowed by Johann Strauss later in his life.

== Selected works ==
- L'adieu: Romance sans paroles for viola and piano, Op.286 (1872)
