= August Labitzky =

Bohemian composer and kapellmeister (1832–1903)

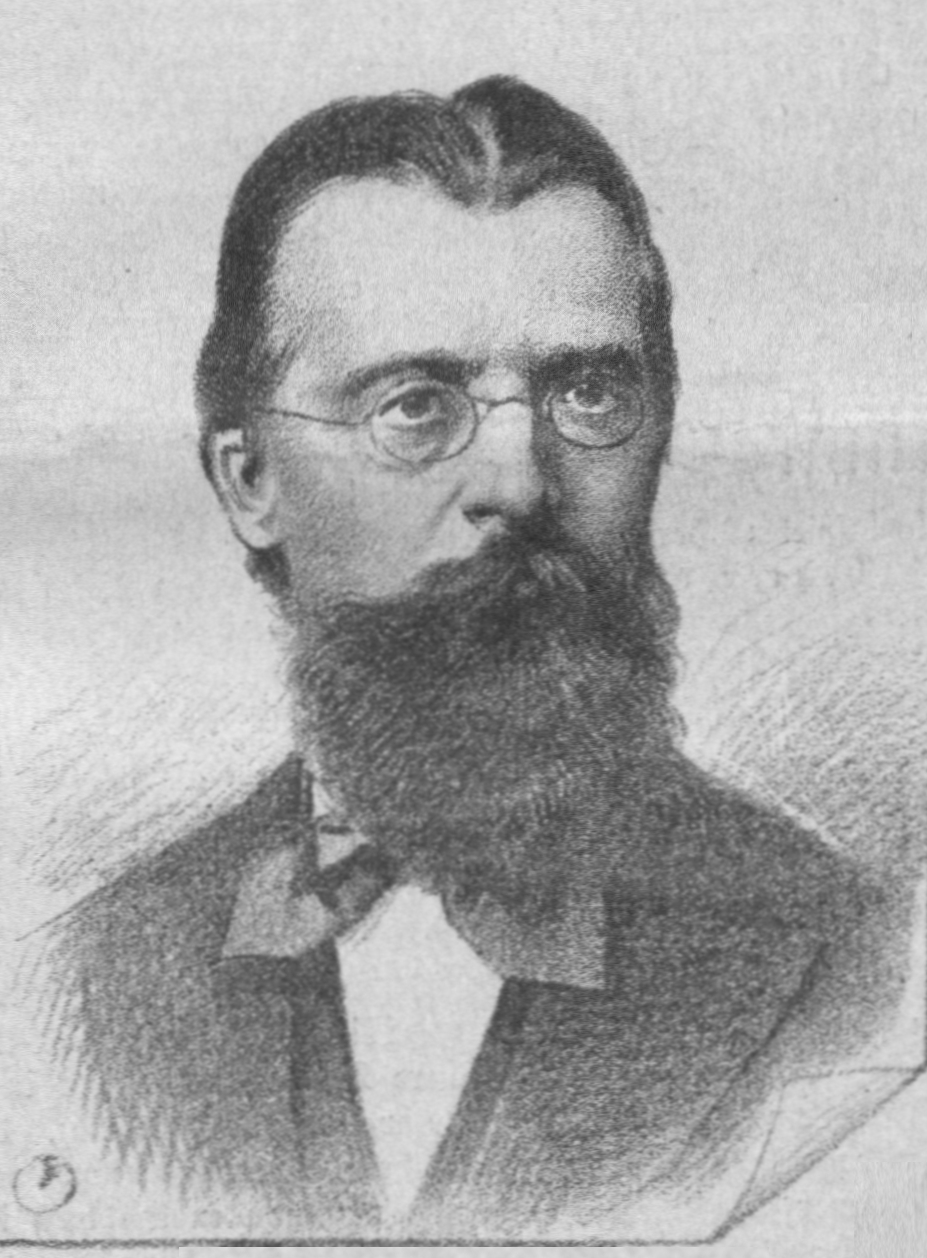
Ignaz Eigner: August Labitzky (1891)

August Labitzky (22 October 1832, Petschau – 29 August 1903, Bad Reichenhall) was a Bohemian composer and kapellmeister, and the son of Joseph Labitzky. Although Labitzky was not as prolific a composer as his father, his Ouverture Characteristique has been occasionally recorded. Written in 1858, it depicts Emperor Charles IV while out hunting. Labitzky also wrote At the Mountain Inn, Idyl around April 1874.
