= Slavkov Forest =

Mountain range in the Czech Republic

- Slavkovský les
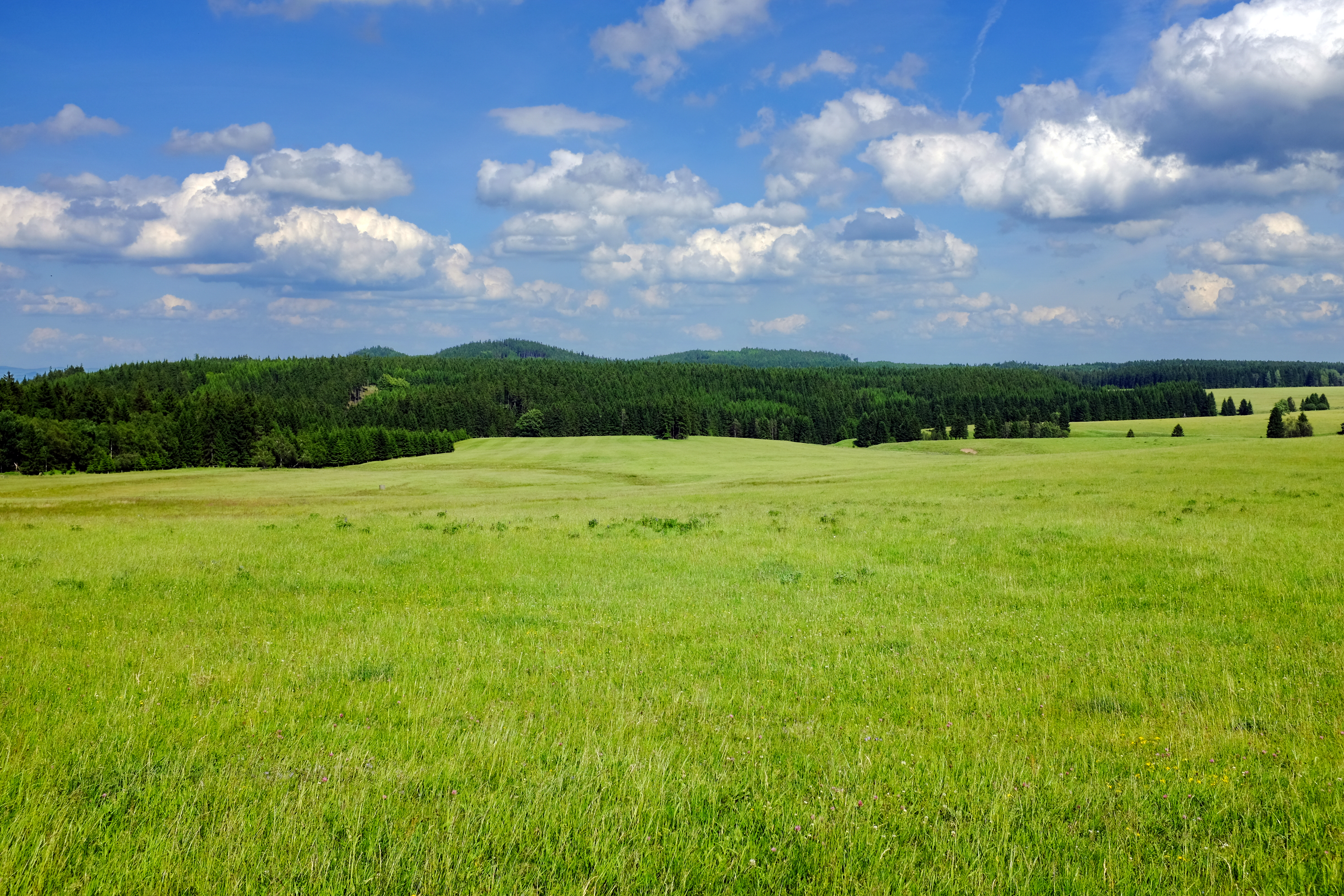
- View of Špičák and Šibeník hills near Krásno Logo of Slavkov Forest Protected Landscape Area, featuring a yellow mountain arnica flower

Highest point
- Peak: Lesný
- Elevation: 983 m (3,225 ft)

Dimensions
- Area: 640 km^{2} (250 mi^{2})

Geography
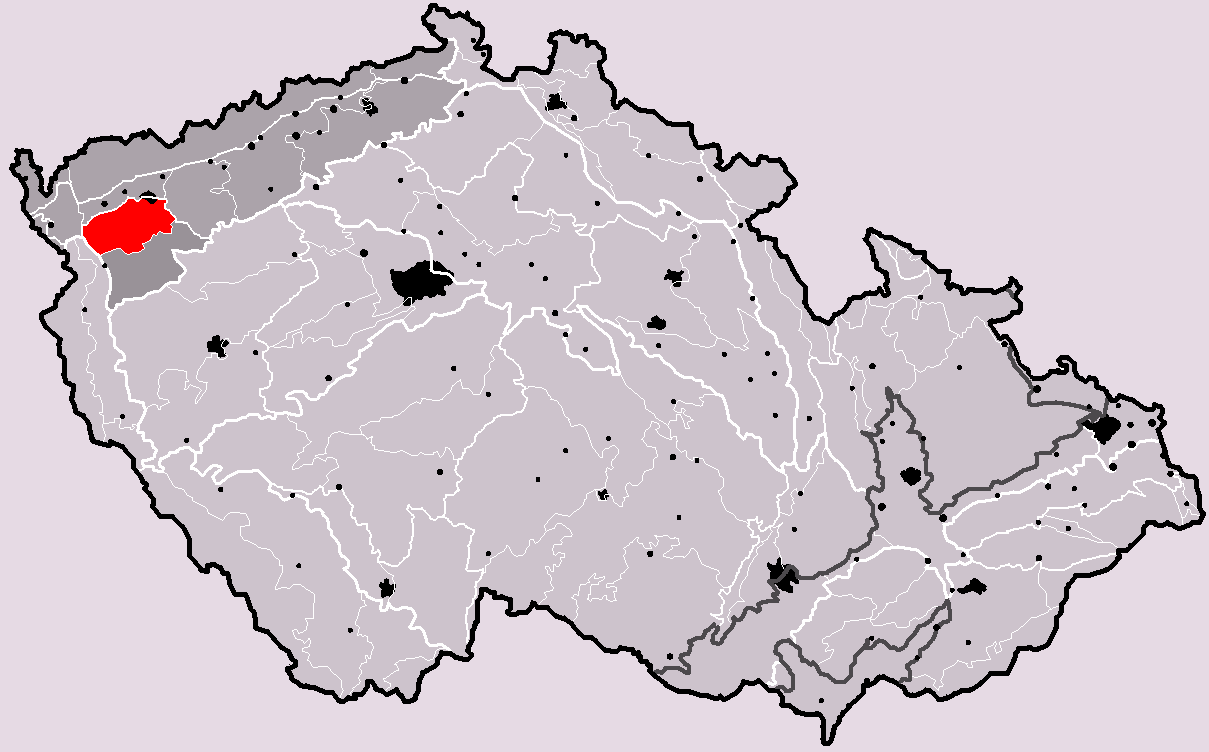
- Slavkov Forest in the geomorphological system of the Czech Republic
- State: Czech Republic
- Regions: Karlovy Vary
- Range coordinates: 50°03′N 12°40′E
- Parent range: Karlovy Vary Highlands

The Slavkov Forest (formerly also Emperor's Forest; Czech: Slavkovský les, German: Kaiserwald) is a highland and geomorphological mesoregion of the Czech Republic. It is located in the Karlovy Vary Region. Slavkov Forest also refers to a protected landscape area, partially located within the highland.

== Geomorphology ==
Slavkov Forest is a mesoregion of the Karlovy Vary Highlands within the Bohemian Massif. It is further subdivided into the microregions of Kynžvart Highlands, Bečov Highlands and Horní Slavkov Highlands.

The region is relatively poorly fragmented. Despite numerous evidence of severe tectonic and erosive disturbance, it is an old well-preserved peneplain from the Oligocene, often with altitudes of around 800 m (2,600 ft) above sea level. It consists of flat and round plateaus of old relief with individual, mostly densely wooded peaks. The highest peaks are Lesný at 983 m (3,225 ft) and Lysina at 982 m (3,222 ft). The lowest point is in Karlovy Vary at 374 m (1,227 ft).

== Geography ==
The forest is a huge water source with direct importance for a large surrounding area, with many notable springs (including mineral water flows). Some of the water from the forest region is used in spas in the western parts of the country. The main watercourse in the territory is the Teplá River. The Ohře briefly crosses the north of the territory.

Slavkov Forest is rather sparsely inhabited. The southern part of Karlovy Vary is located in the Slavkov Forest. Other notable towns include Horní Slavkov and Bečov nad Teplou, and partially Loket, Březová and Lázně Kynžvart.

== Protected landscape area ==
A large part of the region, 606 km^{2} all in all, is a protected as the Slavkov Forest Protected Landscape Area (PLA). The name Slavkov Forest is used for both the geomorphological region and the protected area. On the south, the protected landscape area includes also a part of the Teplá Highlands and a small part of the Podčeskoleská Hills, and on the contrary, the easternmost part of the Slavkov Forest geomorphological region does not belong to the protected landscape area. The PLA was established in 1974, with headquarters in Karlovy Vary, and the protection includes 10 nature reserves, 12 nature monuments, and 3 national nature monuments.

=== Flora ===
The ancient and heavily eroded mountain range is home to a diverse range of habitats, plants and animals. The southwestern parts holds extensive raised bogs, a peculiar habitat with rare plants like bilberry willow trees (Salix myrtilloides) and the carnivorous round-leaved sundew (Drosera rotundifolia) and common butterwort (Pinguicula vulgaris). Woodlands cover more than half of the protection, and they are dominated by spruce, with only small remnants of the original beech forest left. The various rock types of the eroded mountains each hosts unique ecosystems. Where serpentinite rock dominates for example, relicts of old-growth scots pine woods can be found in a mix with interesting plants like spleenwort ferns, including serpentine spleenwort (Asplenium cuneifolium), and flowering herbs such as winter heath (Erica carnea), box-leaved milkwort (Polygala chamaebuxus), and the rare sandwort-leaved mouse-ear (Cerastium alsinifolium) that only grows in these forests. In the glades and open areas of the forest, several types of orchids and herbs are also found, including the fragrant, and bright yellow, symbol of the Slavkov Forest Protected Area: mountain arnica (Arnica montana).

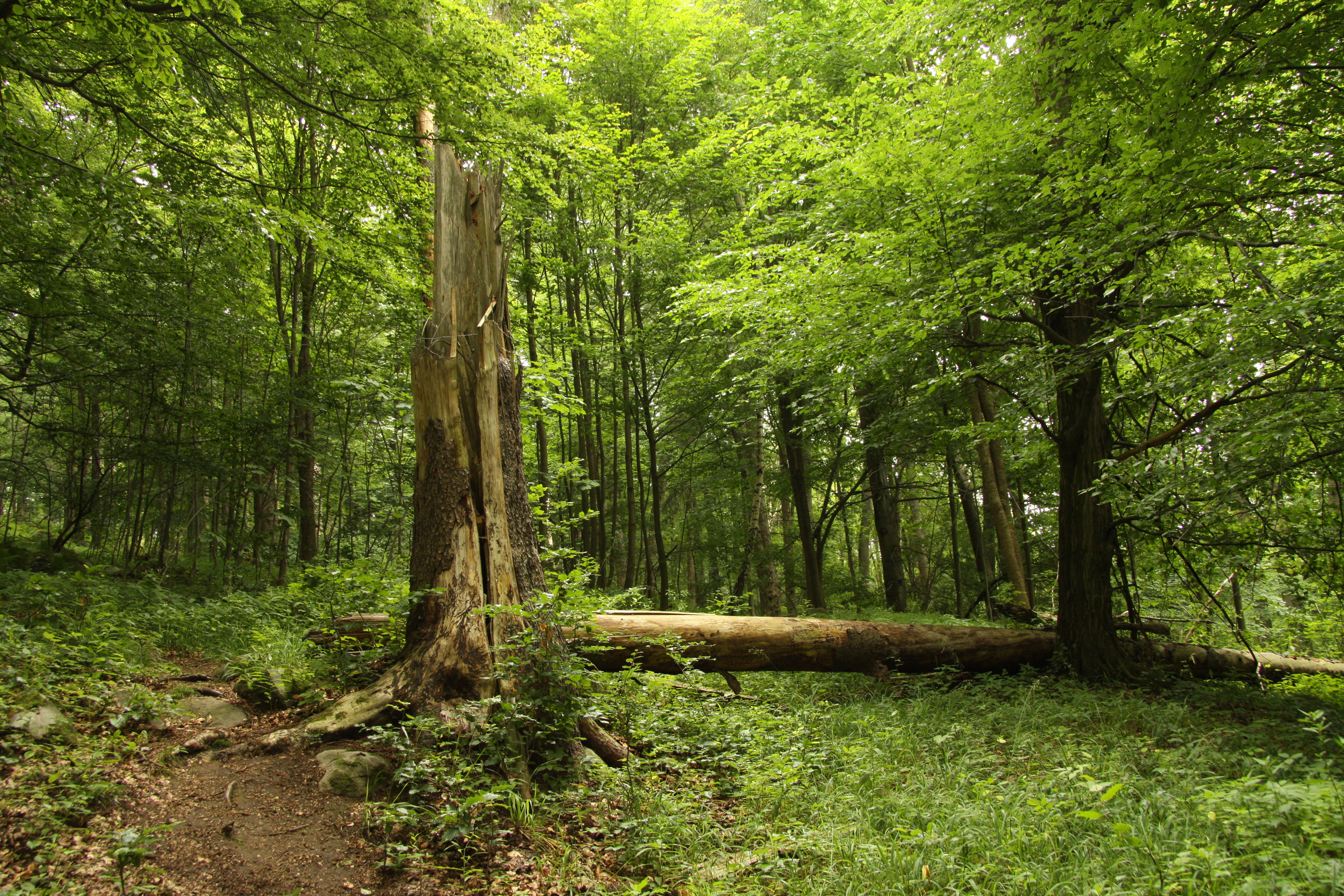
Deciduous woods (Žižkův vrch nature reserve)

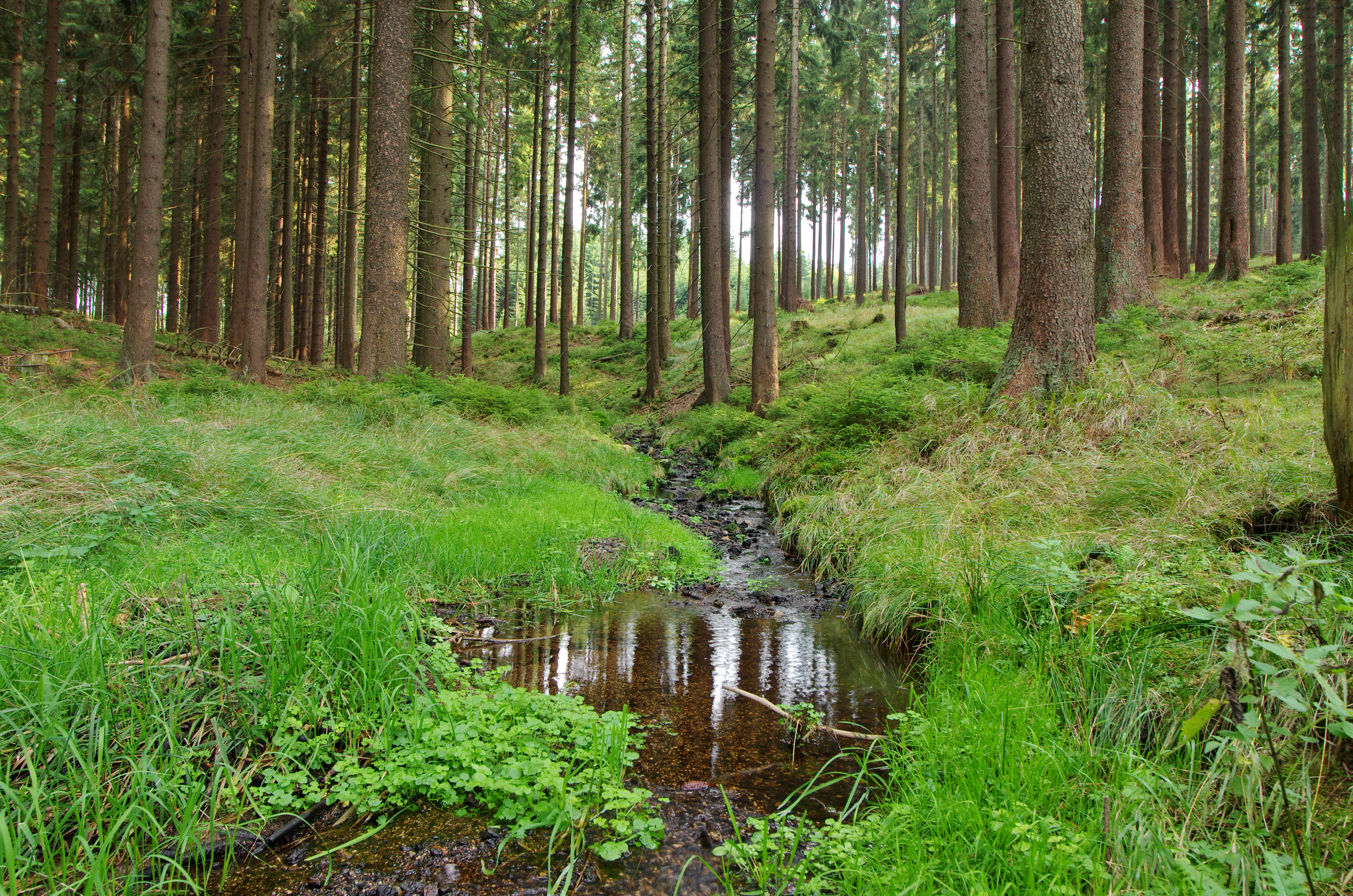
Conifer dominates most parts of the forests

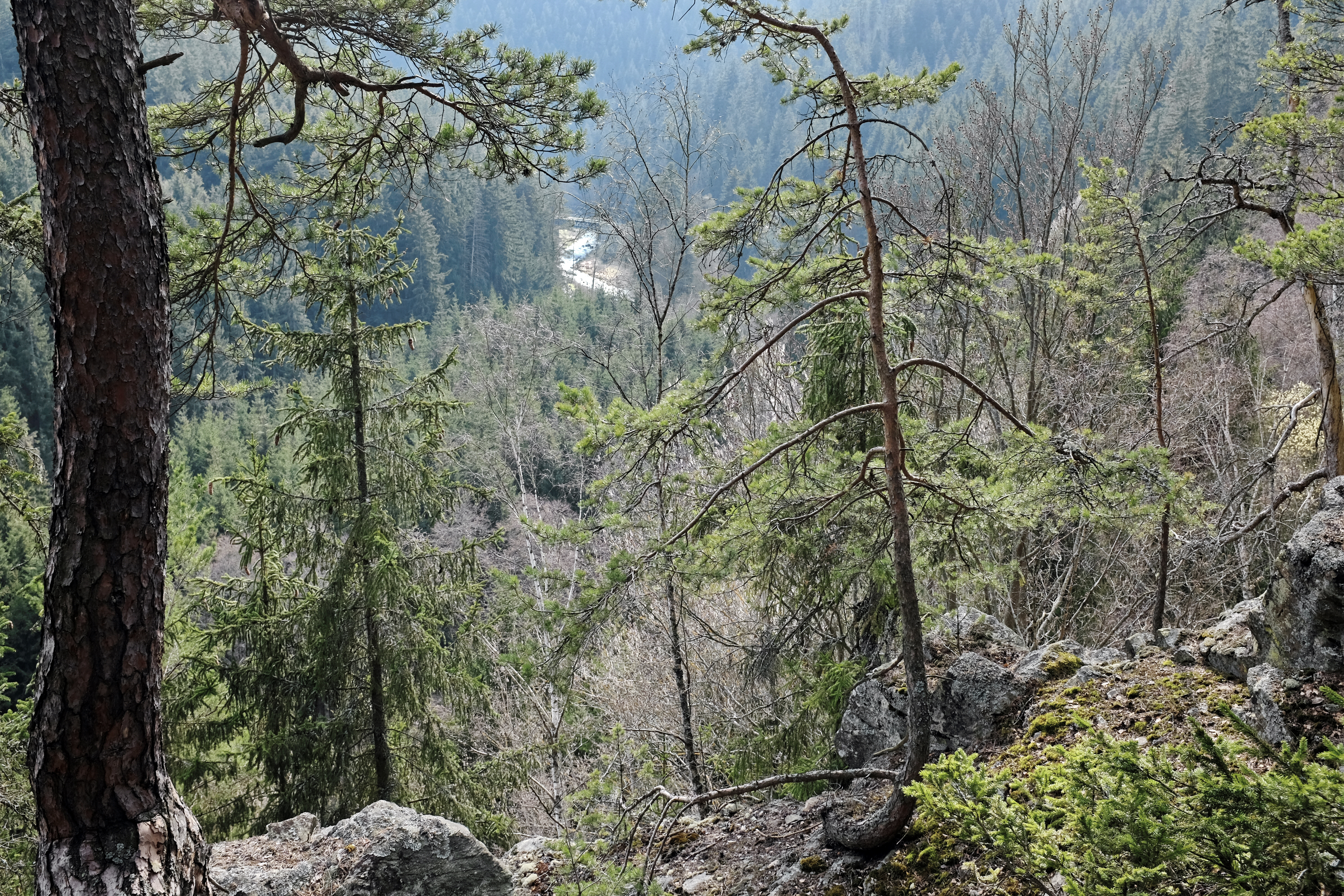
Scots pine remain in some areas

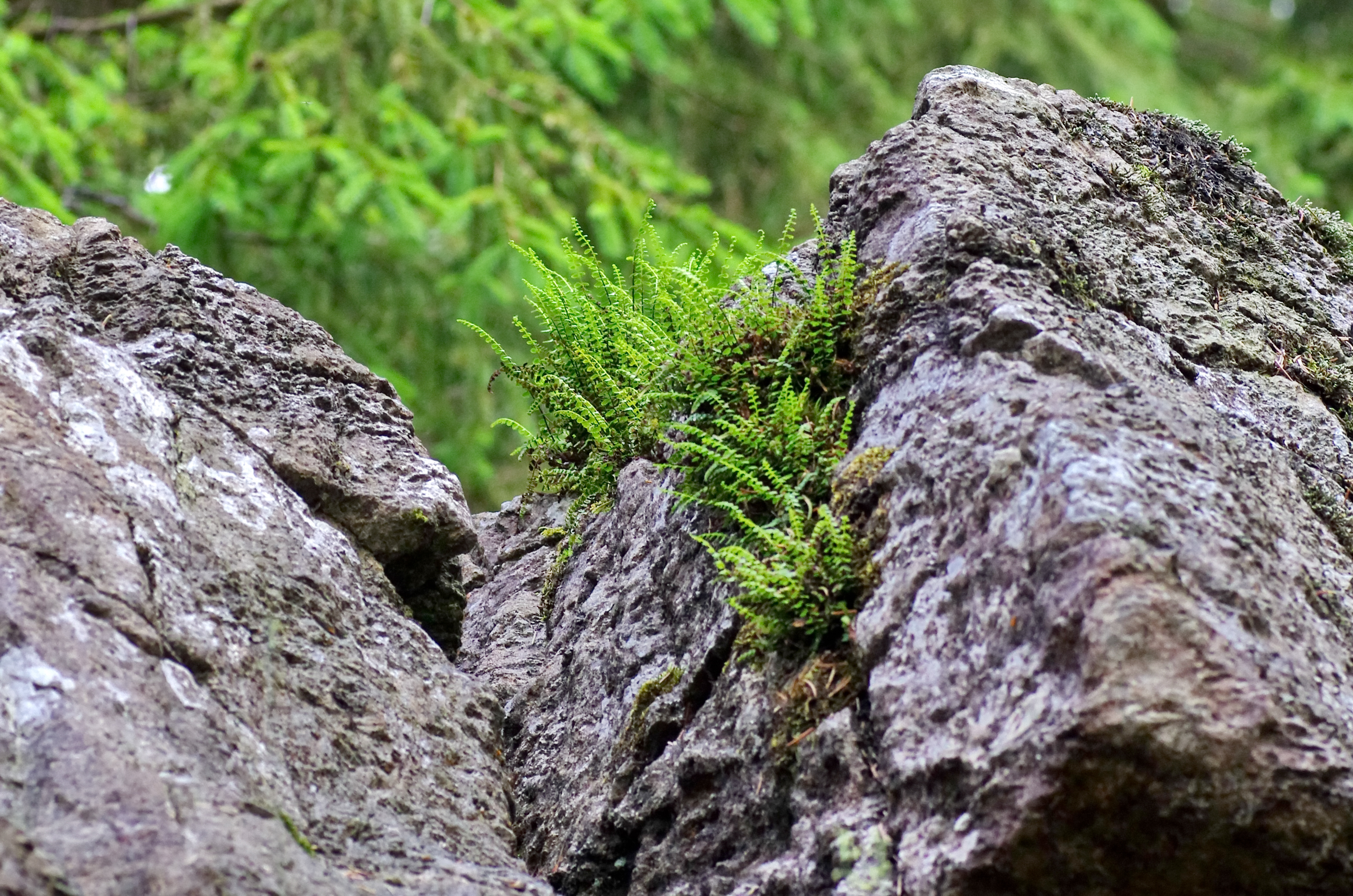
Spleenwort ferns

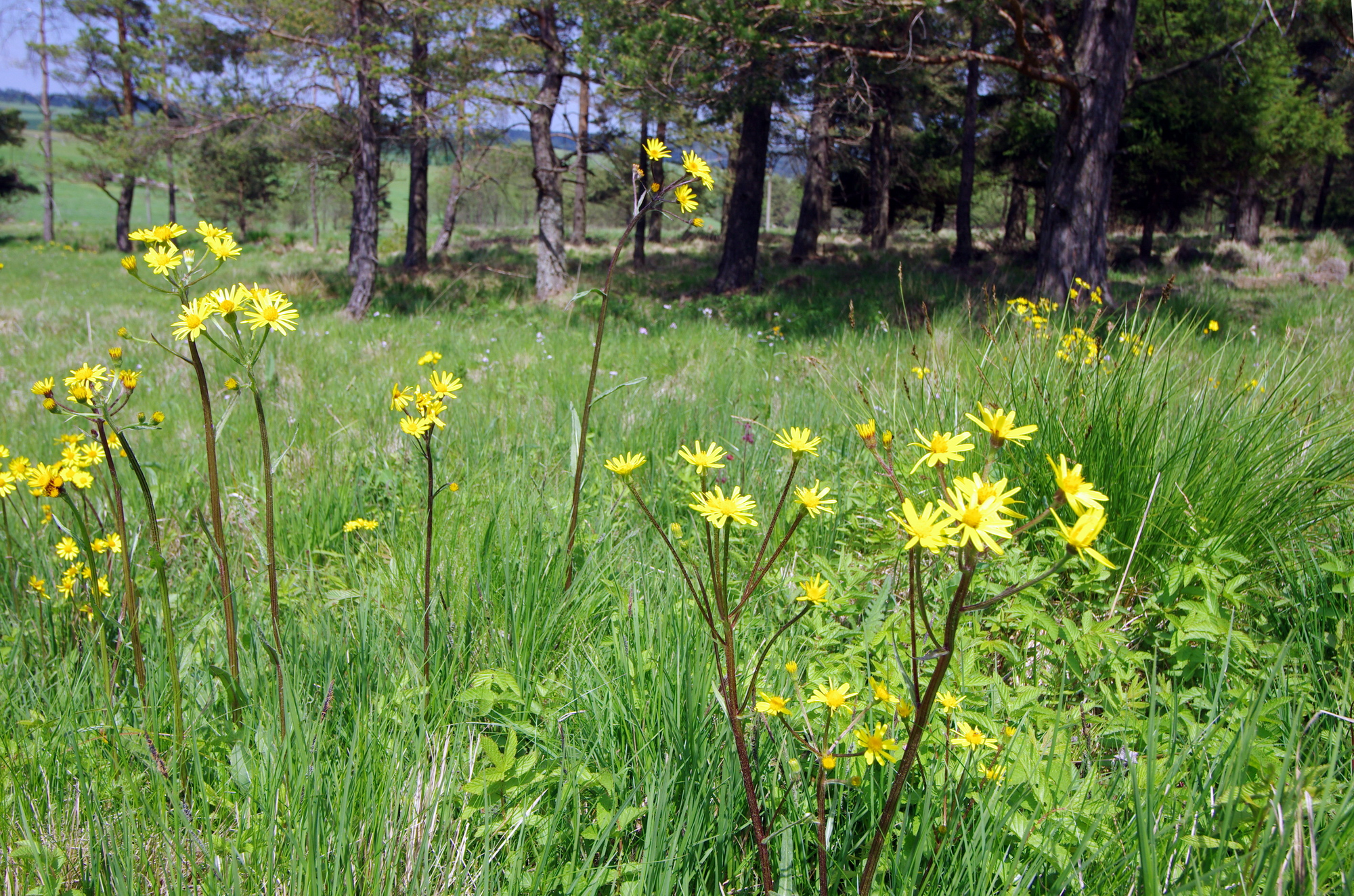
Mountain arnica

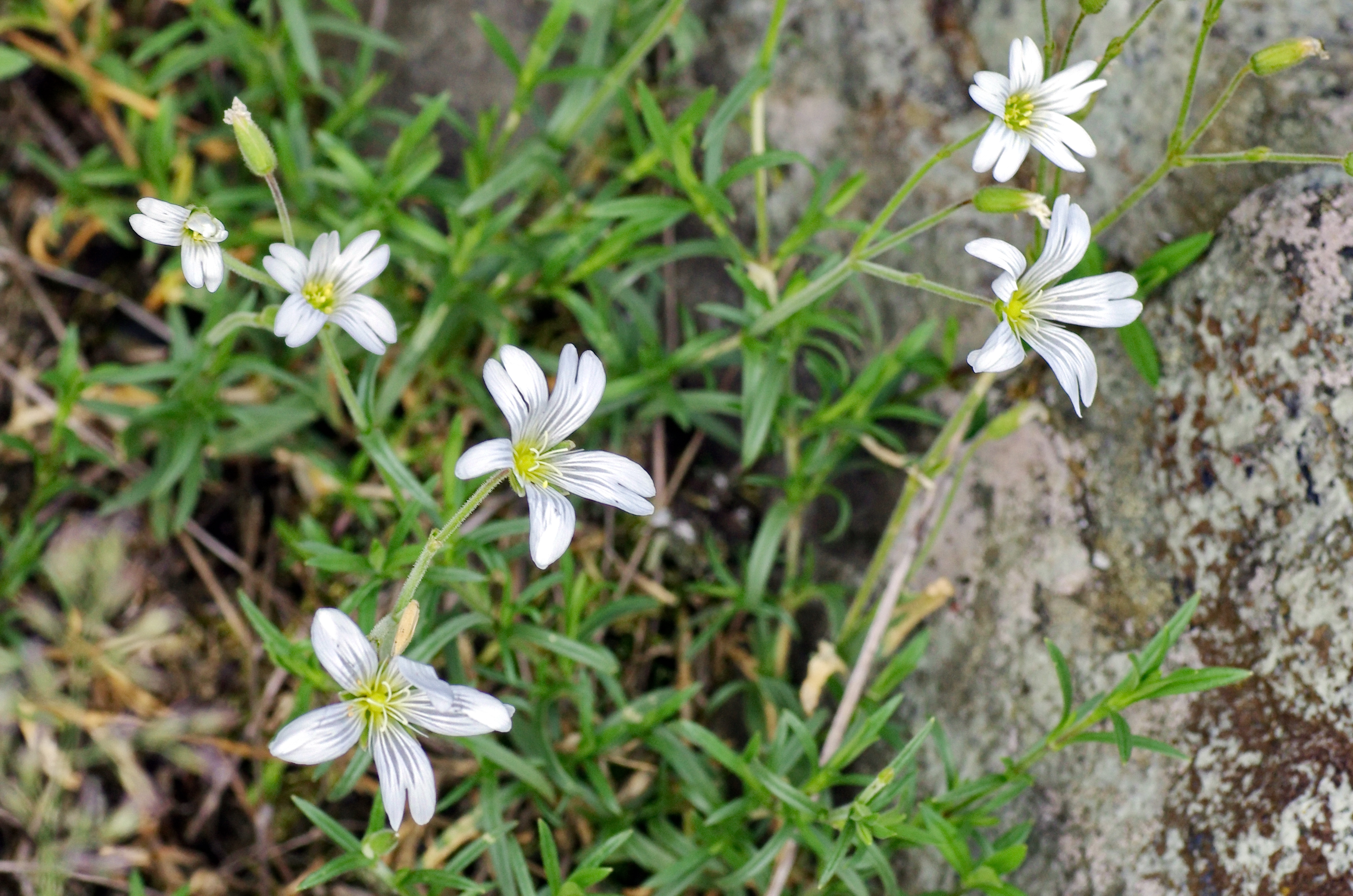
Sandwort-leaved mouse-ear

=== Fauna ===
The fauna is also diverse, but mostly with well-known animals such as deer, wild boar and several types of martens, but also wood grouse and ground squirrel, the westernmost location of this particular species. Birds are abundant, including birds of prey and owls in unusual large numbers. Woodpeckers, such as the great spotted woodpecker, might be heard from mid-winter till summer, and the migratory black storks, are regular breeders in the forest.

=== Threats ===
The forest has suffered several human disturbances with lasting effects in the last 150 years or so. Because of the soil composition and local geology, tree growth is innately slow in most parts of the forest, and this makes it more difficult than usual for the forests here to recover from any damage or disturbance.

In 1874 to 1894, mono-plantations with European spruce were introduced to some parts, and even-aged spruce woods are still here today. The spruce are not doing well in areas with serpentinite rocks, which leaves safe spaces for the original scots pine. In the 1970s and 1980s, the northwestern parts of Czech Republic was badly affected by atmospheric deposition of sulphur. The sulphur is naturally transformed to sulfuric acid, commonly known as acid rain, and this is toxic to plants, and to a lesser degree animals. Visitors to the area, also inevitably bring in plants and seeds foreign to the original habitat, and some of these new ruderal plants can outcompete local species. In modern times, the tree growth is also stressed from deer and muflon foraging on young trees.

== Gallery ==
Landscapes and nature

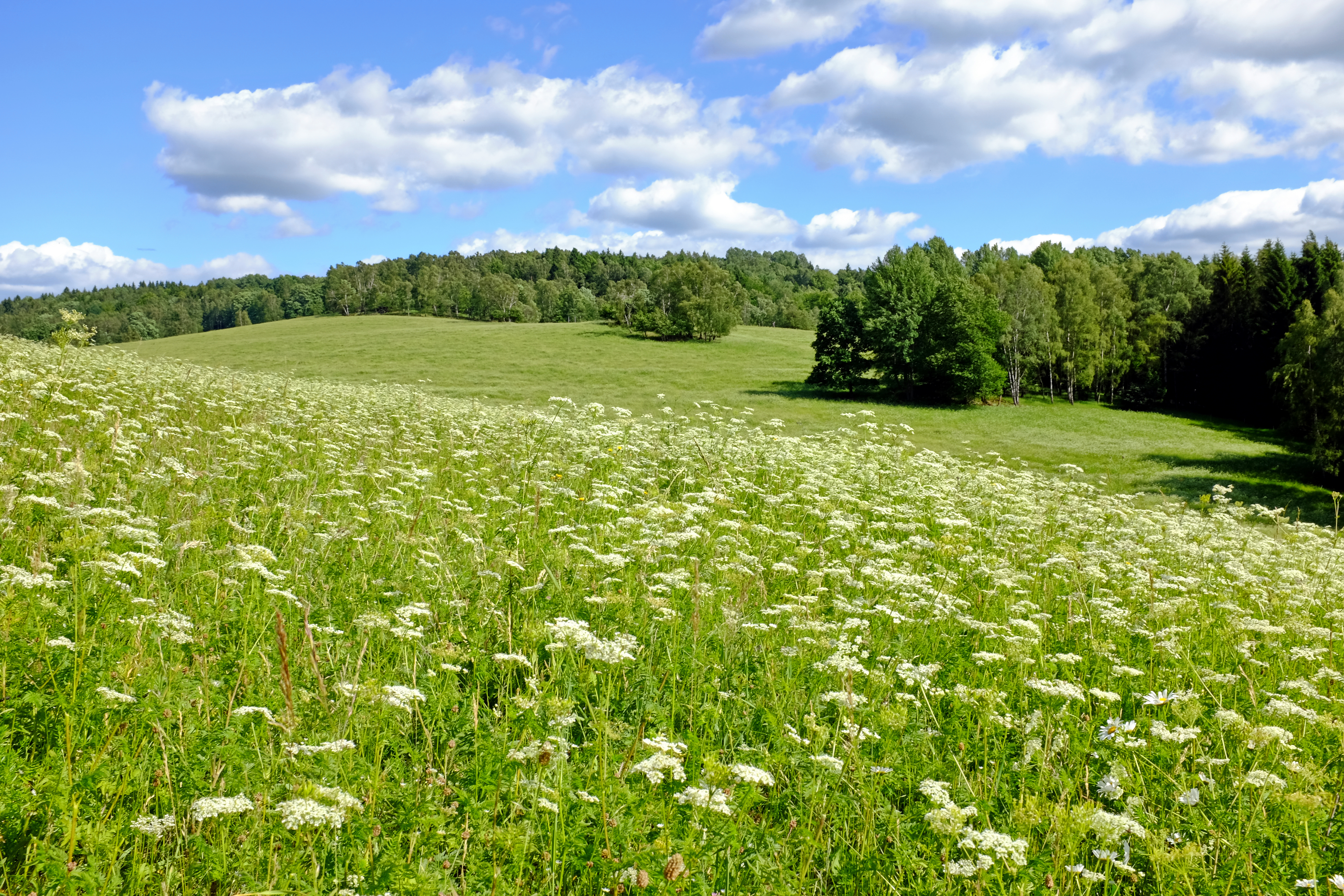
Extensive grasslands and meadows

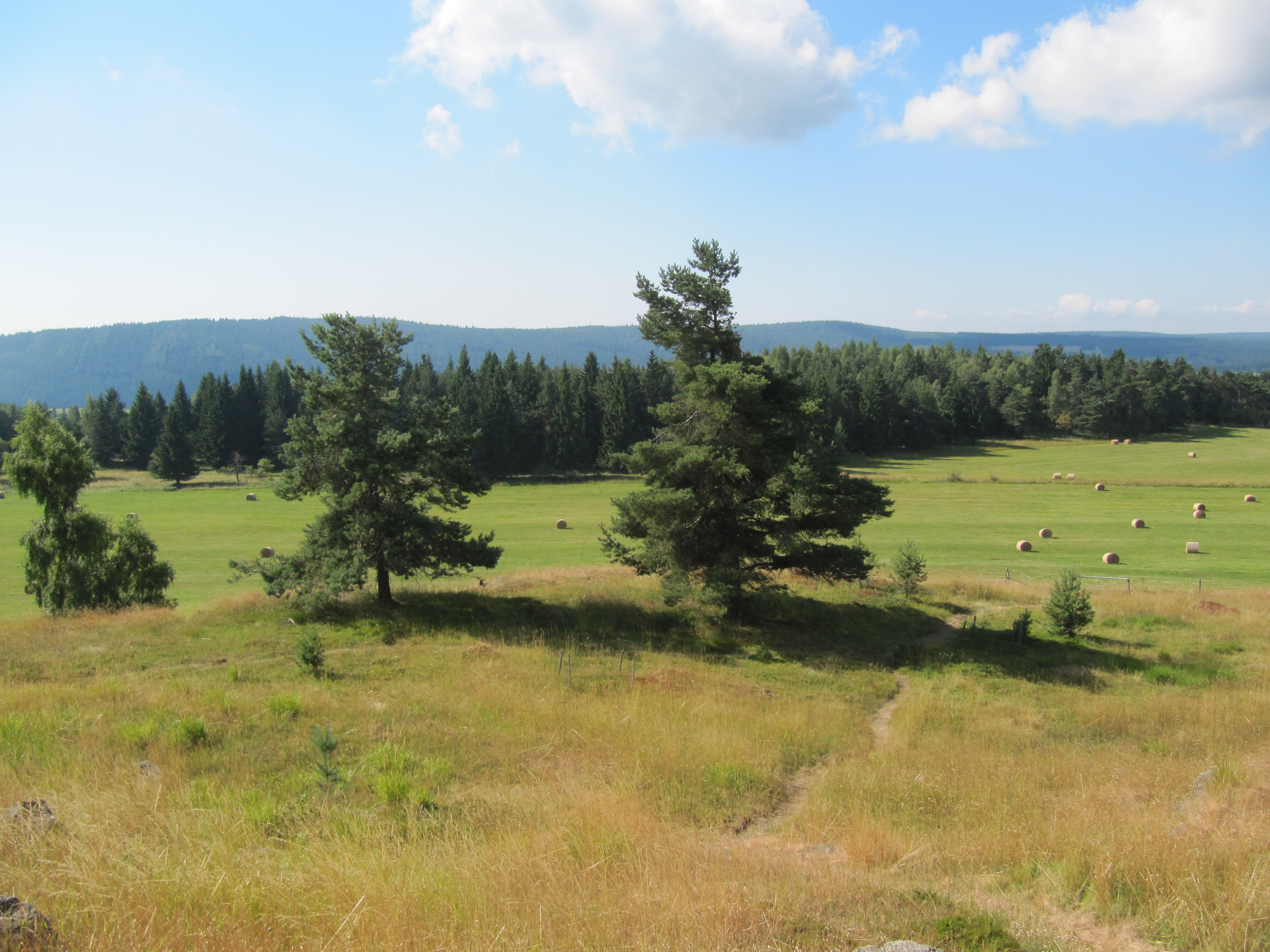
Pastures and forested low hills

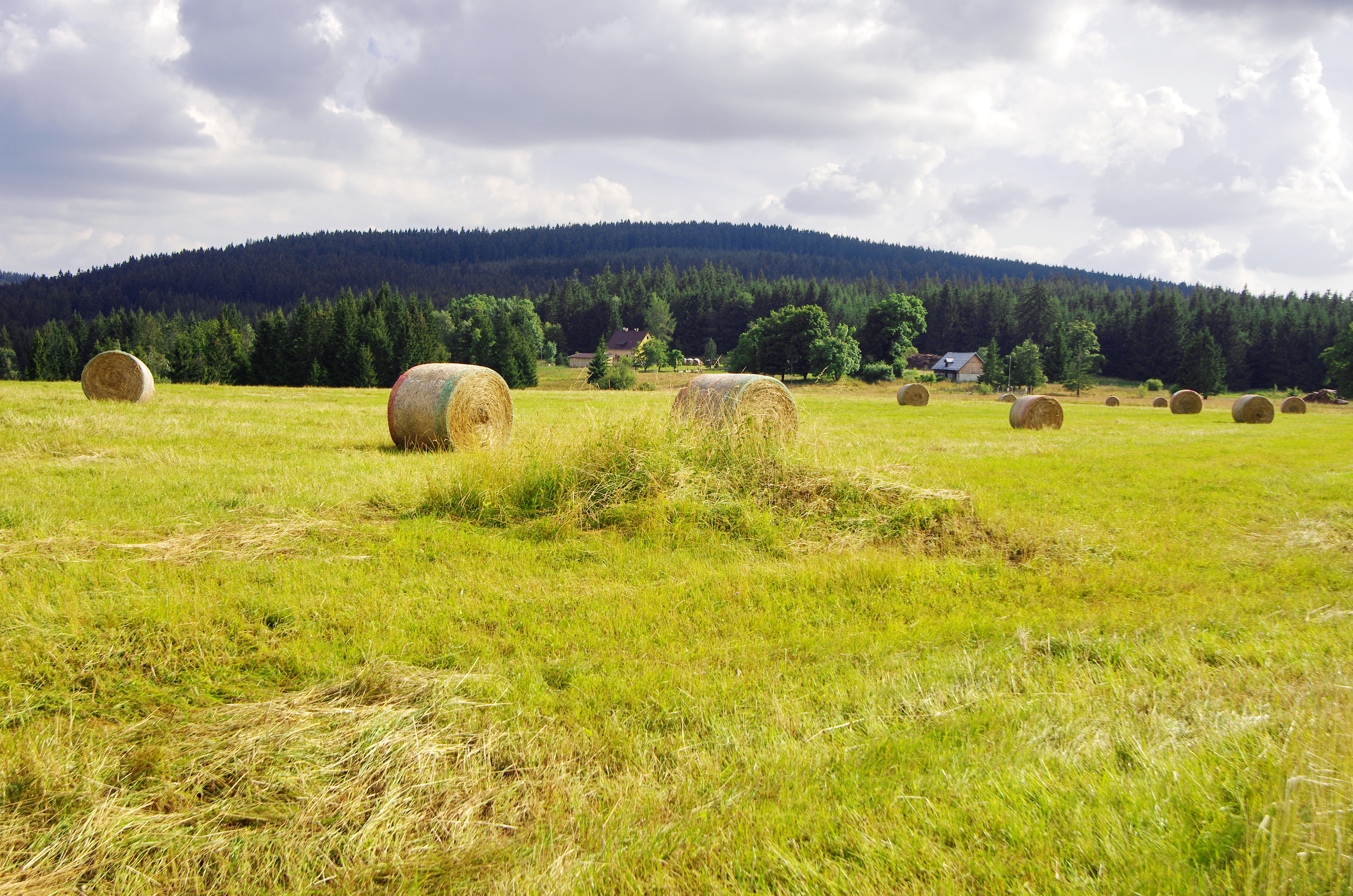
Lesný, the highest hill in the Slavkov Forest

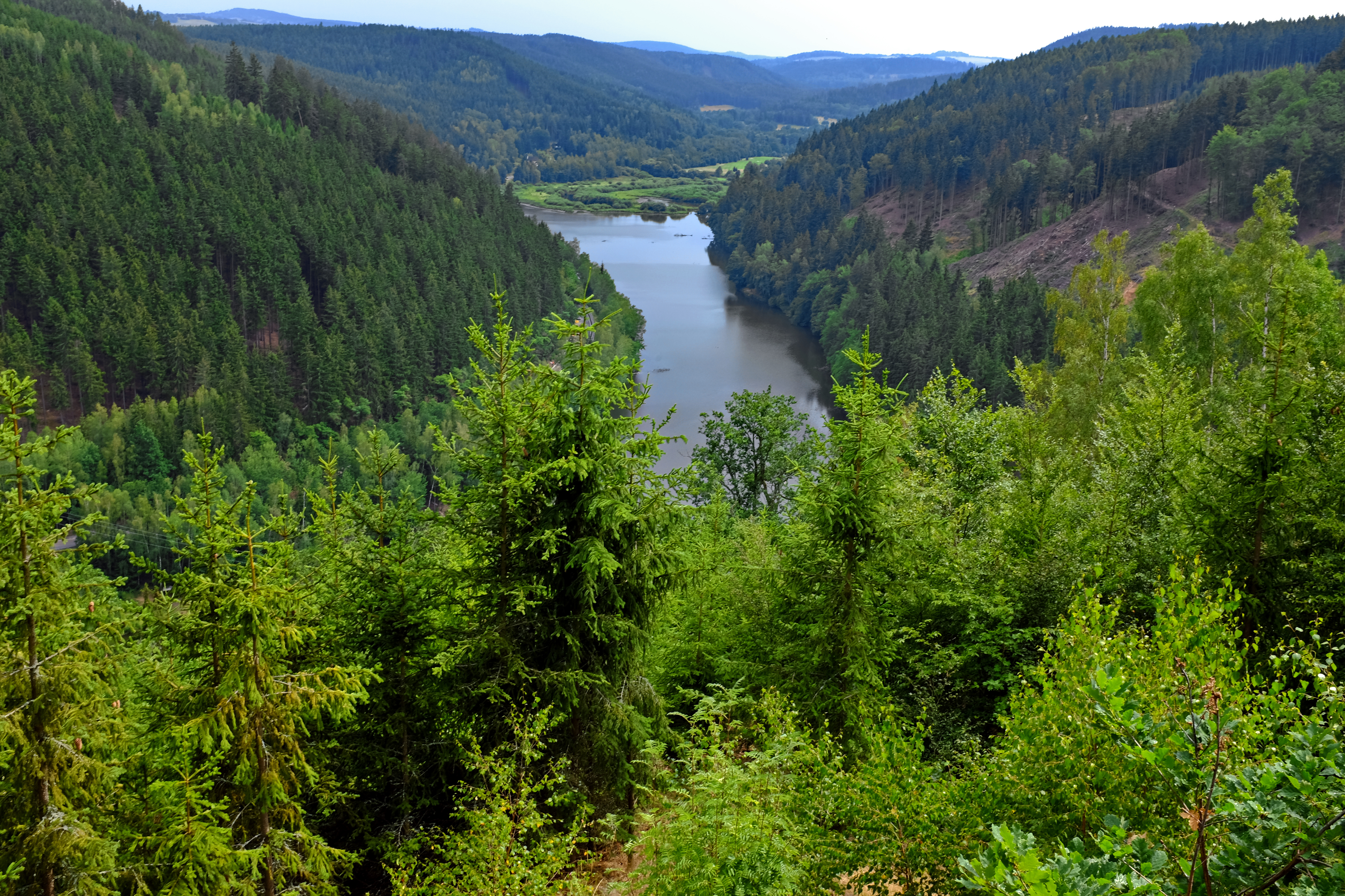
Teplá River, the main watercourse

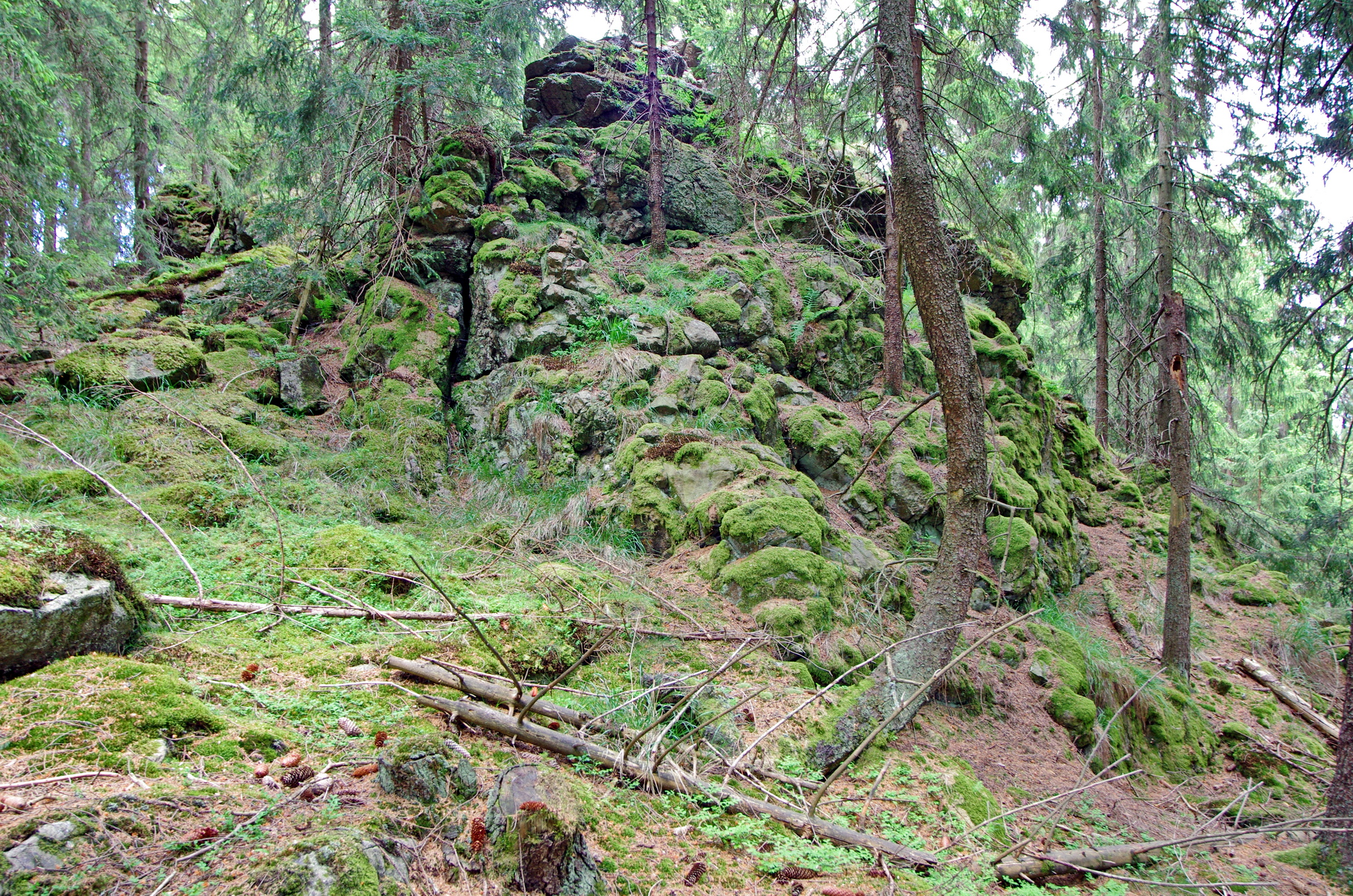
Heavily eroded outcrops

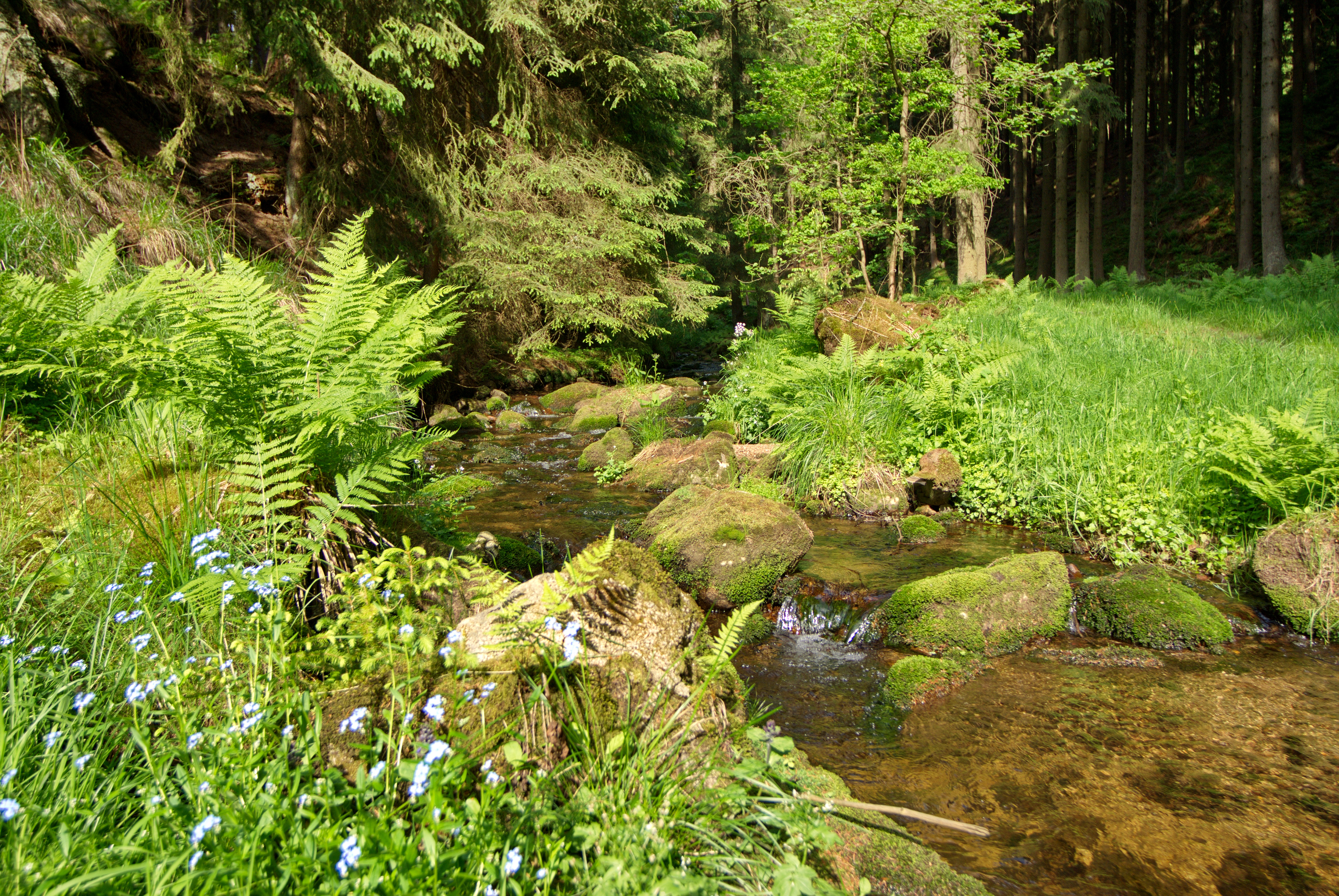
Small streams and springs

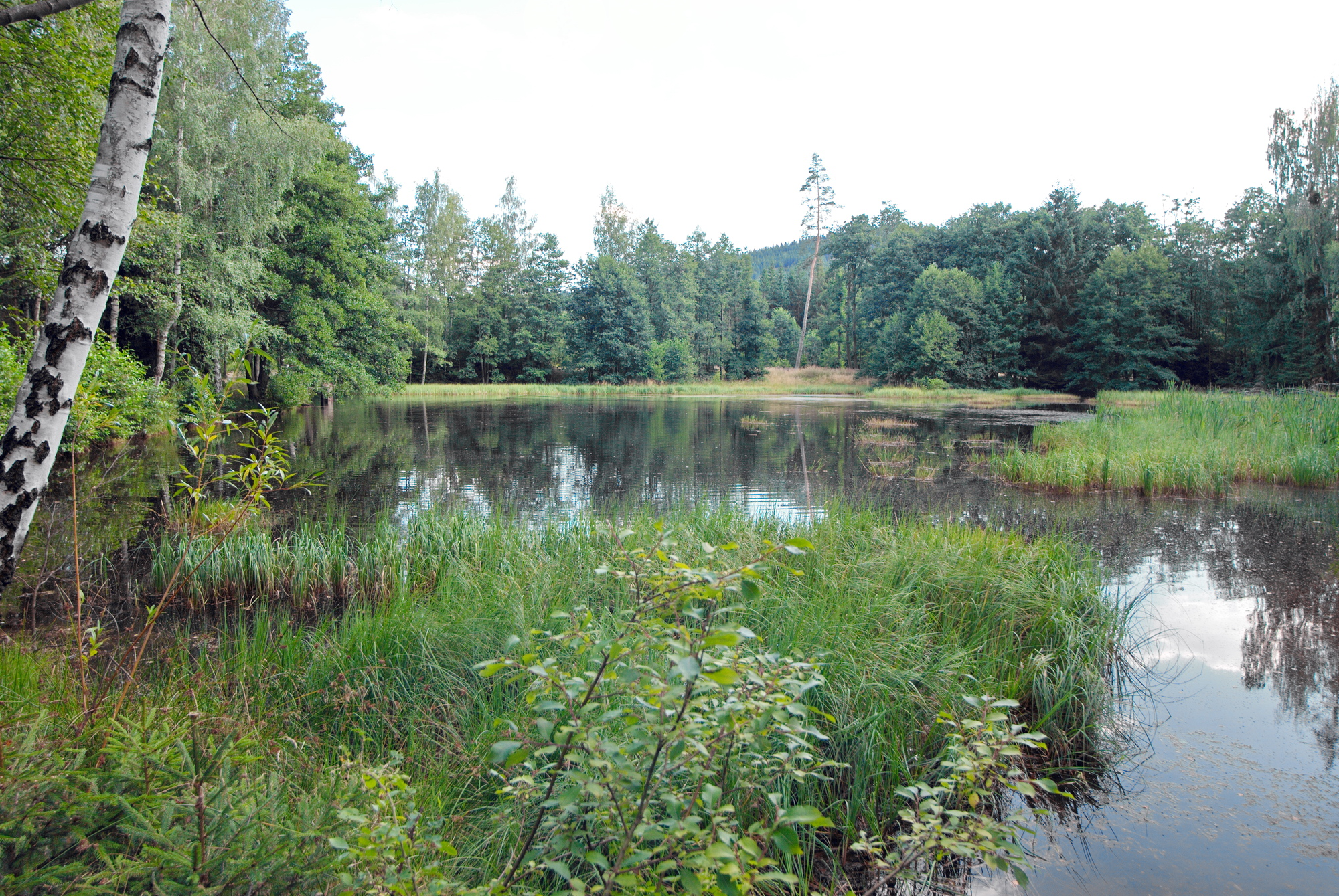
Small lakes and extensive boglands

Features

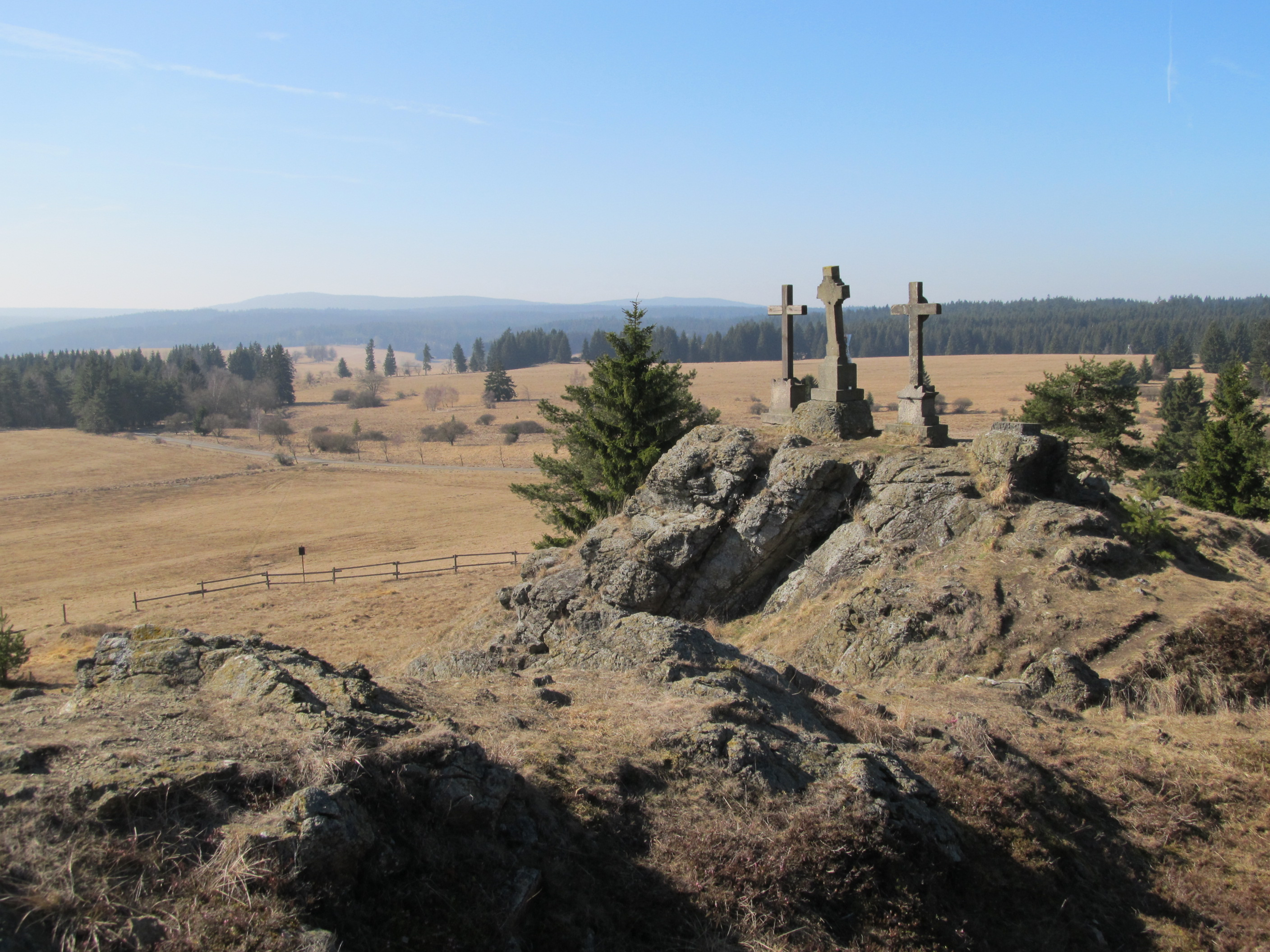
Křížky National Nature Monument

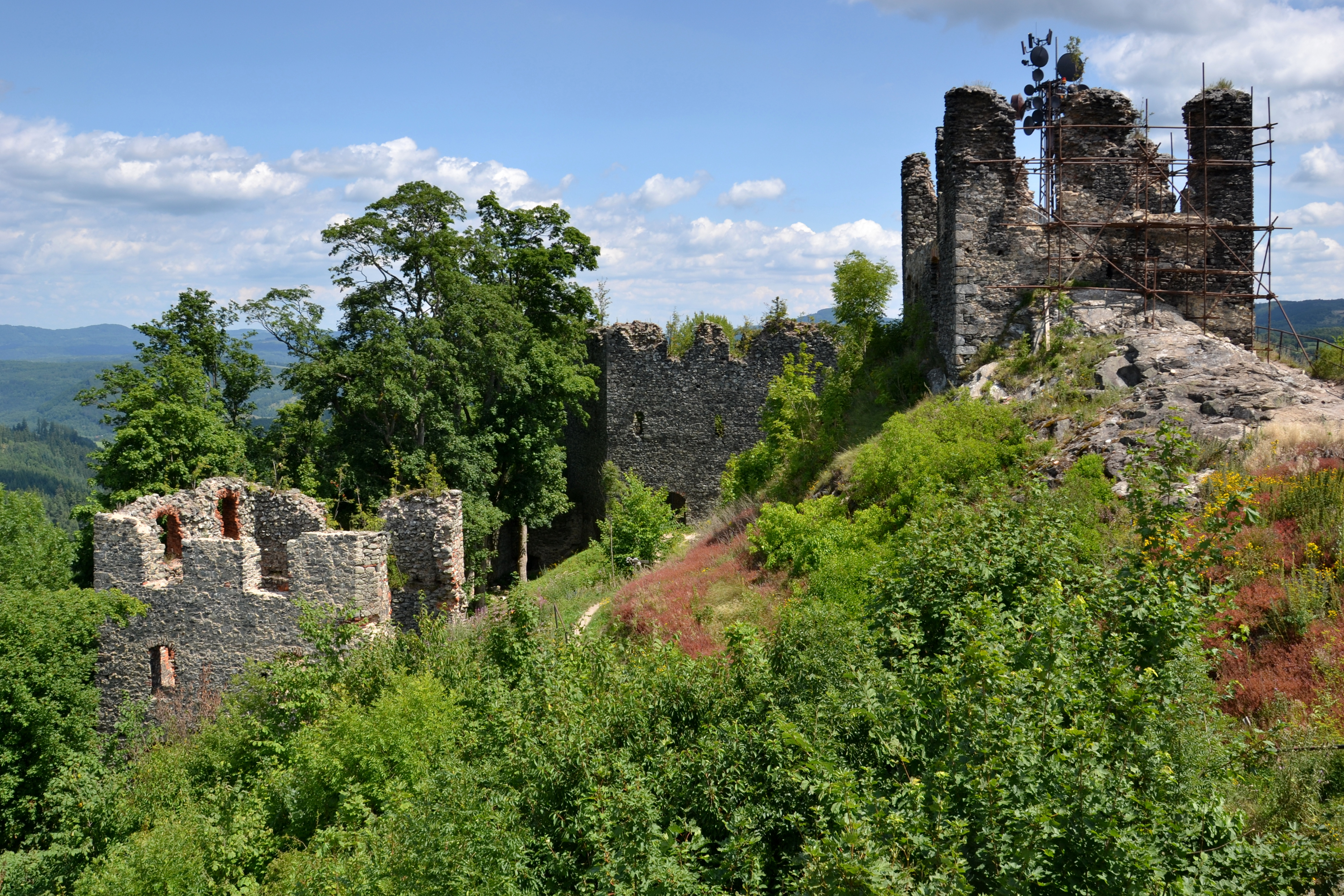
Ruins of Andělská Hora castle

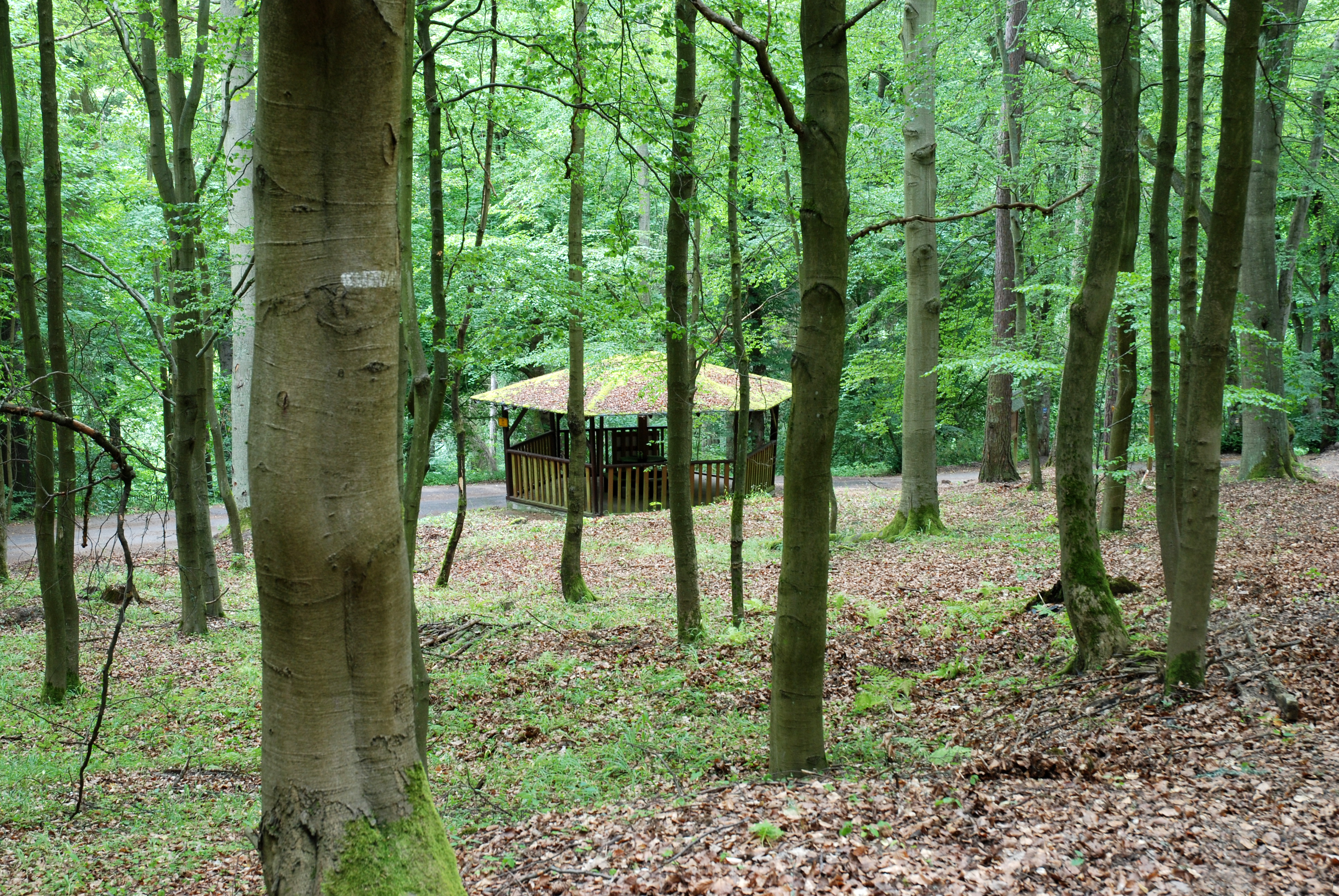
Beethoven's Gazebo, a hiking hut

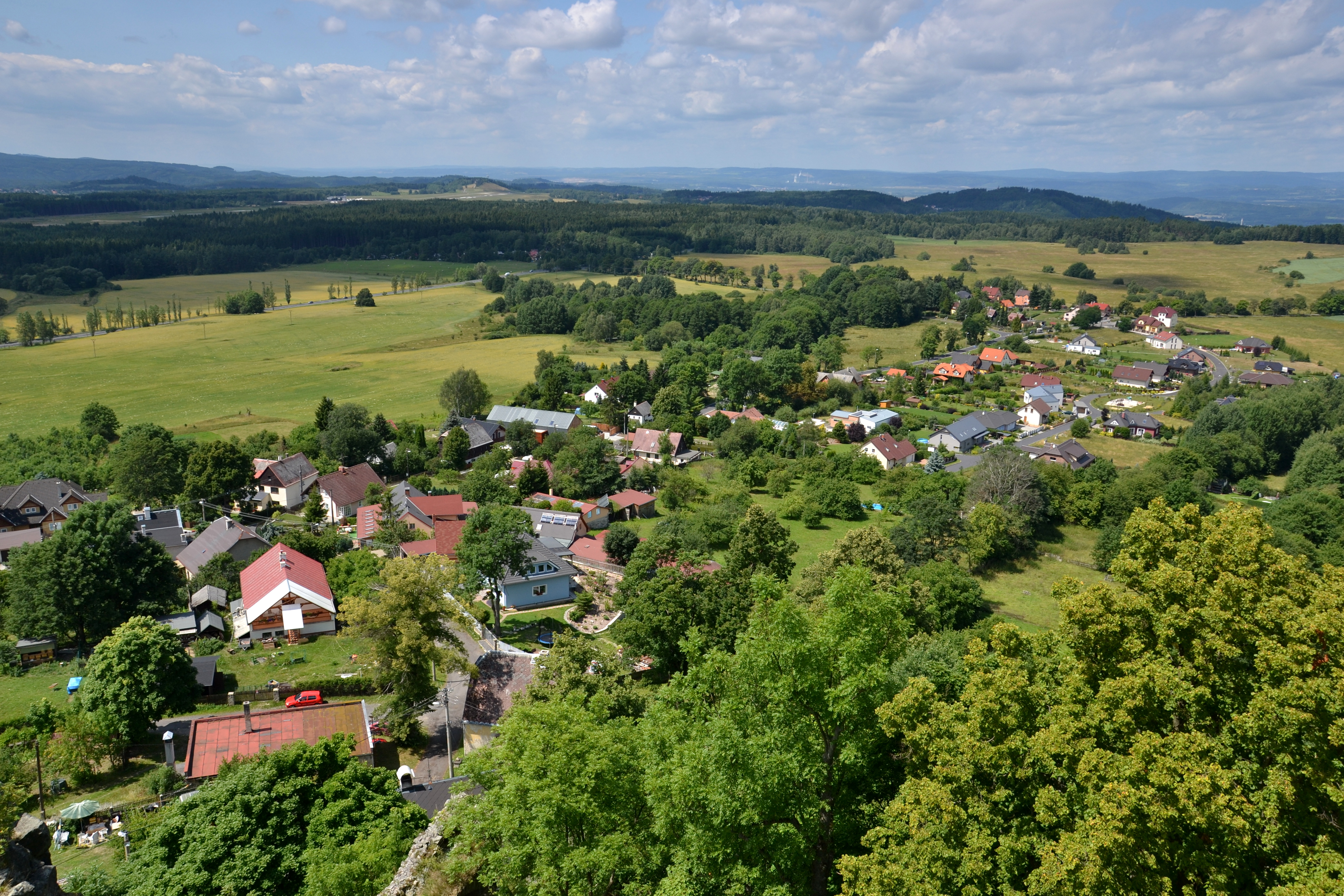
Andělská Hora

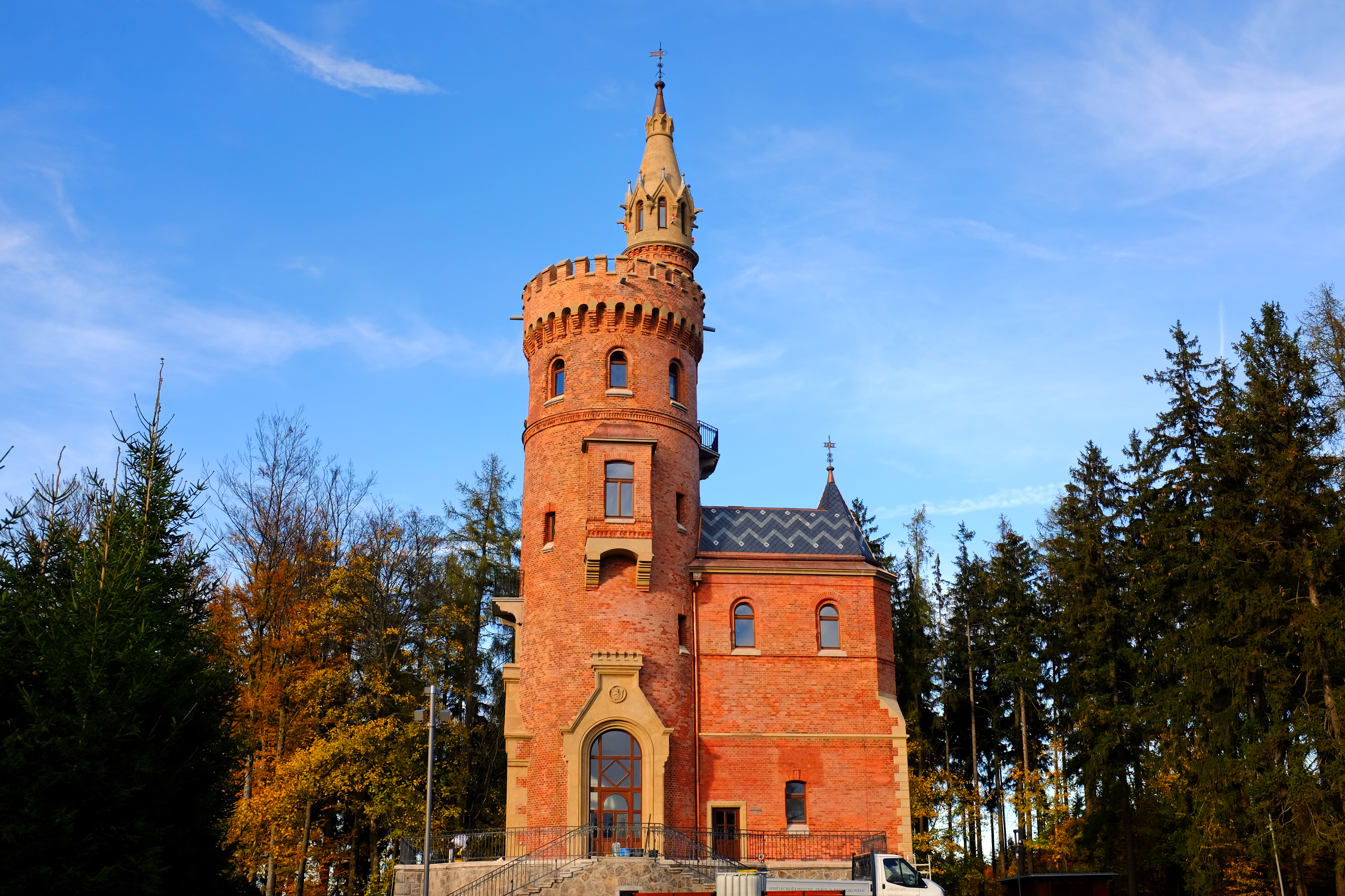
Goethe's View (Goethova vyhlídka) observation tower

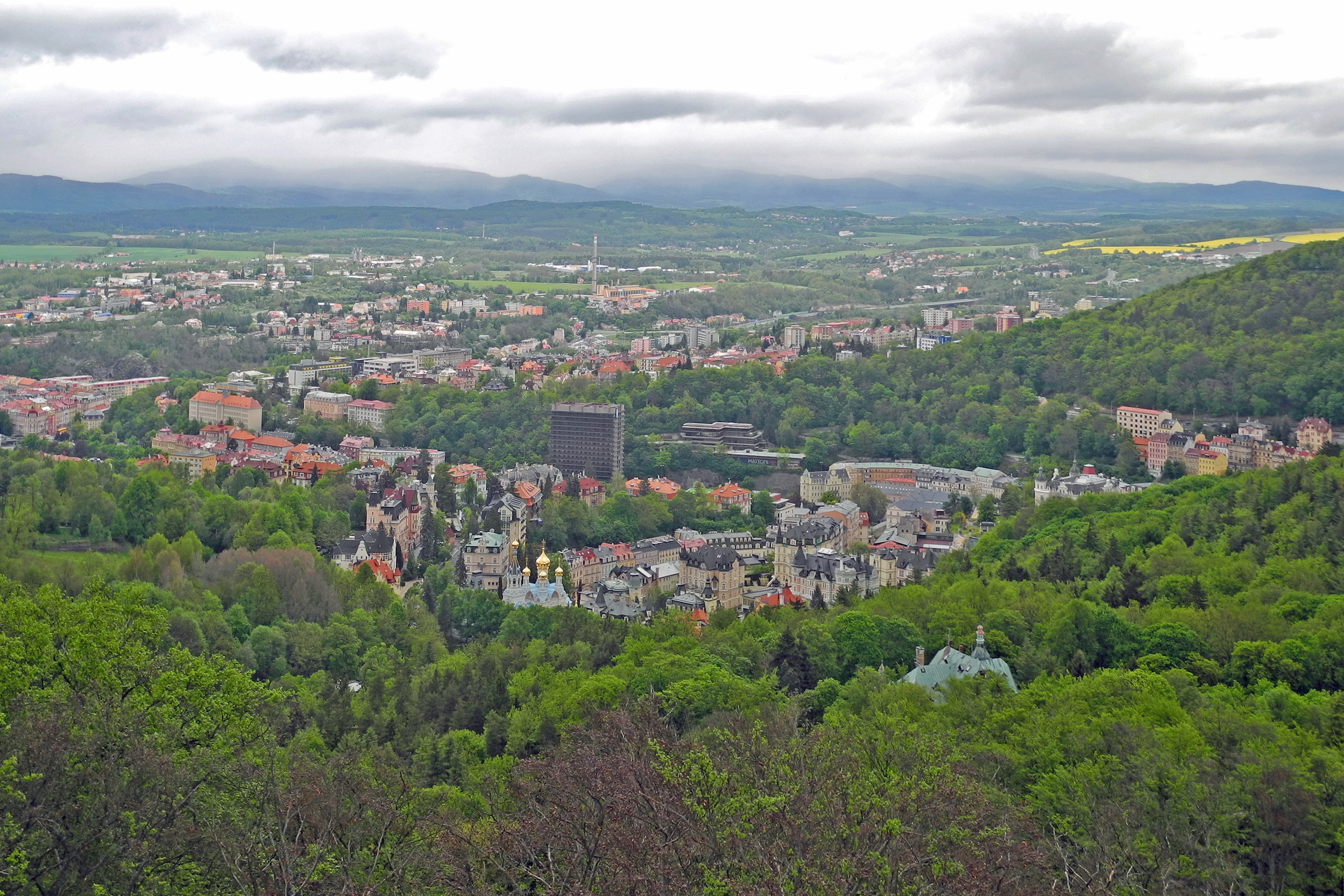
View across the southern part of Karlovy Vary

== Literature ==
- Jiří Majer: Těžba cinu ve Slavkovském lese v 16. stoleti, Prague, 1970
- Jiří Majer: Die Forstwirtschaft und Holzverwendung in den böhmischen Bergrevieren des Westerzgebirges und des Kaiserwaldes während des 16. Jahrhunderts. in: Sächsische Heimatblätter 43(1997)1, pp. 11–18
