= Bečov nad Teplou =

Town in the Czech Republic

- Town
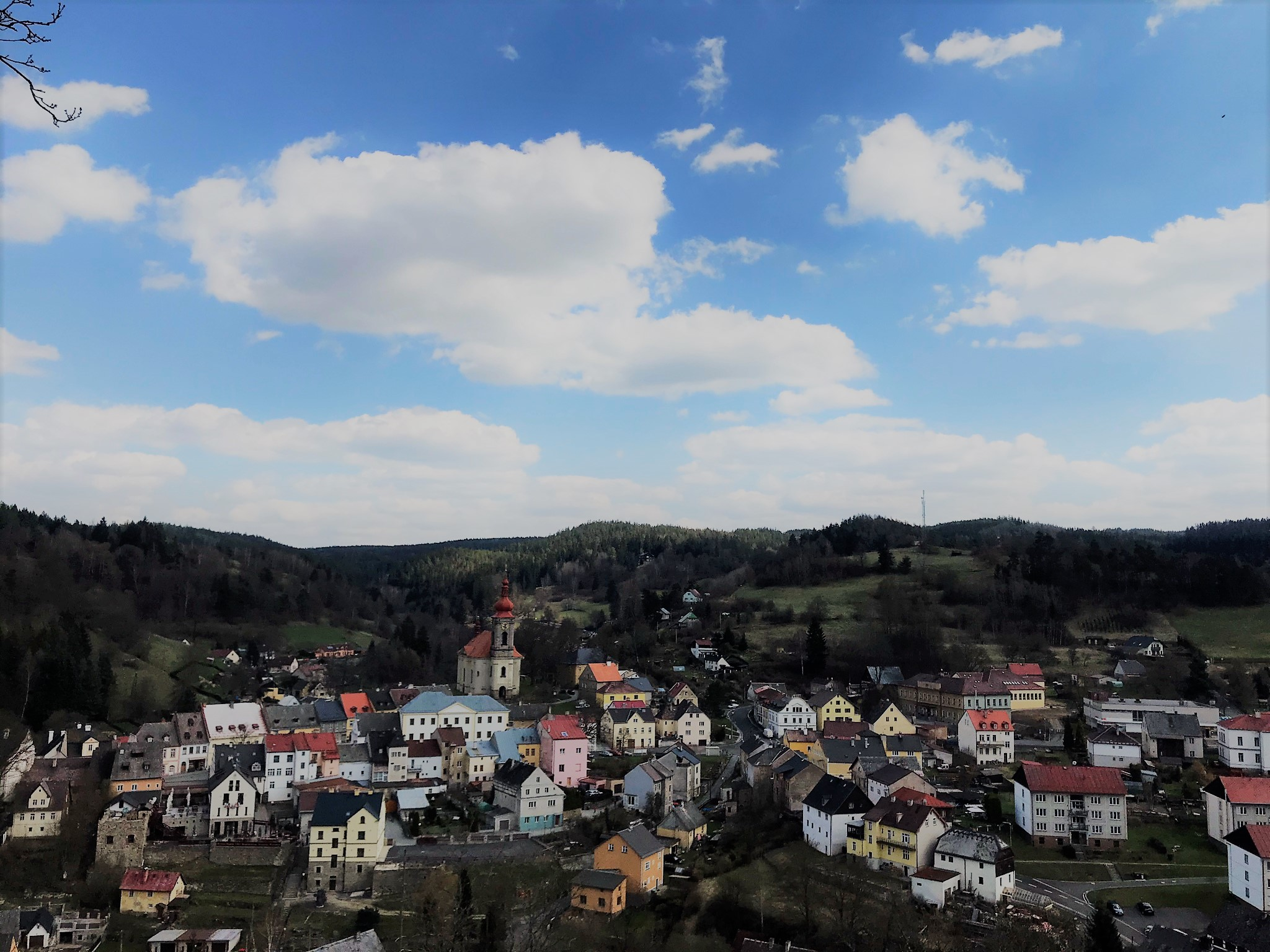
- General view

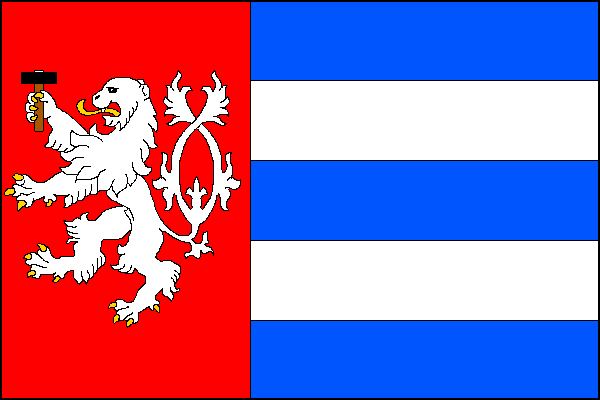
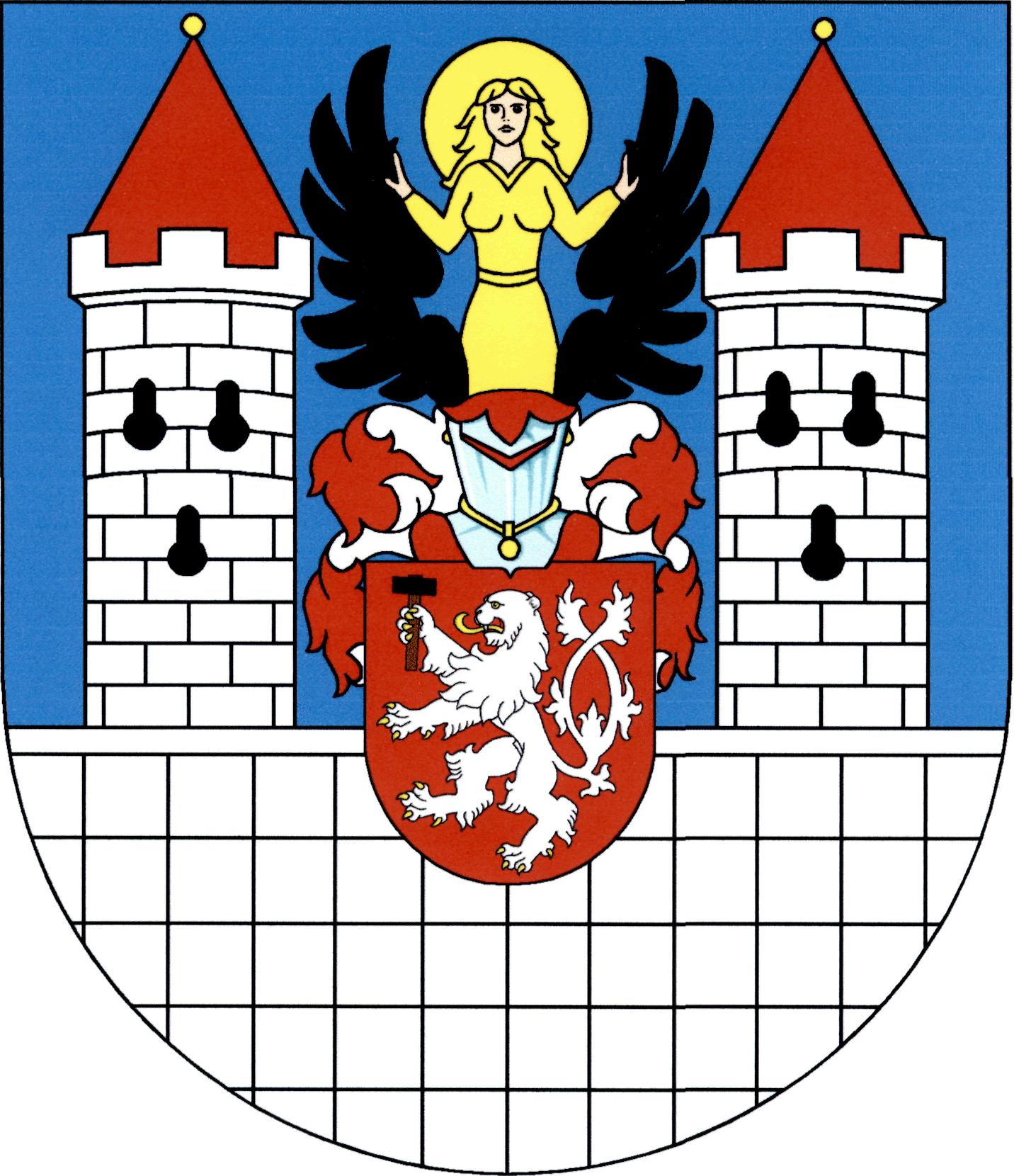
- Flag Coat of arms

- Location in the Czech Republic
- Coordinates: 50°5′0″N 12°50′18″E
- Country: Czech Republic
- Region: Karlovy Vary
- District: Karlovy Vary
- First mentioned: 1387

Government
  - Mayor: Miroslav Nepraš

Area
  - Total: 19.82 km^{2} (7.65 sq mi)
- Elevation: 532 m (1,745 ft)

Population (2026-01-01)
  - Total: 911
  - Density: 46.0/km^{2} (119/sq mi)
- Time zone: UTC+1 (CET)
  - Summer (DST): UTC+2 (CEST)
- Postal code: 364 64
- Website: www.becov.cz

Bečov nad Teplou (Czech pronunciation: [ˈbɛtʃof ˈnat tɛplou]; German: Petschau) is a town in Karlovy Vary District in the Karlovy Vary Region of the Czech Republic. It has about 900 inhabitants. The town is located on the Teplá River in the Slavkov Forest.

Bečov nad Teplou was founded in the 14th century. The historic town centre is well preserved and is protected by law as urban monument zone. The main landmark is the complex of Bečov Castle and Bečov Chateau, which is protected as a national cultural monument. The castle is known for the Reliquary of St. Maurus.

== Administrative division ==
Bečov nad Teplou consists of three municipal parts (in brackets population according to the 2021 census):

- Bečov nad Teplou (754)
- Krásný Jez (84)
- Vodná (71)

Krásný Jez forms an exclave of the municipal territory.

== Etymology ==
According to the most probable theory, the initial name of the settlement was Bečkov and the name was derived from the personal name Bečka, meaning "Bečka's (court)".

== Geography ==
Bečov nad Teplou is located about 16 kilometres (10 mi) south of Karlovy Vary. It lies in the Slavkov Forest. The highest point is the hill Besídka at 713 m (2,339 ft) above sea level. The Teplá River flows through the town.

== History ==
The first written mention of the Bečov Castle is from 1317. It was founded by the Lords of Rýzmburk. The settlement of Bečov was first mentioned in 1387. In 1399, it was promoted to a town.

== Demographics ==
Historical population

Year	Pop.	±%
1869	2,905	—
1880	2,828	−2.7%
1890	2,729	−3.5%
1900	2,868	+5.1%
1910	2,809	−2.1%

Year	Pop.	±%
1921	2,760	−1.7%
1930	2,853	+3.4%
1950	1,238	−56.6%
1961	1,512	+22.1%
1970	1,250	−17.3%

Year	Pop.	±%
1980	1,138	−9.0%
1991	1,086	−4.6%
2001	1,002	−7.7%
2011	962	−4.0%
2021	909	−5.5%

Source: Censuses

== Transport ==
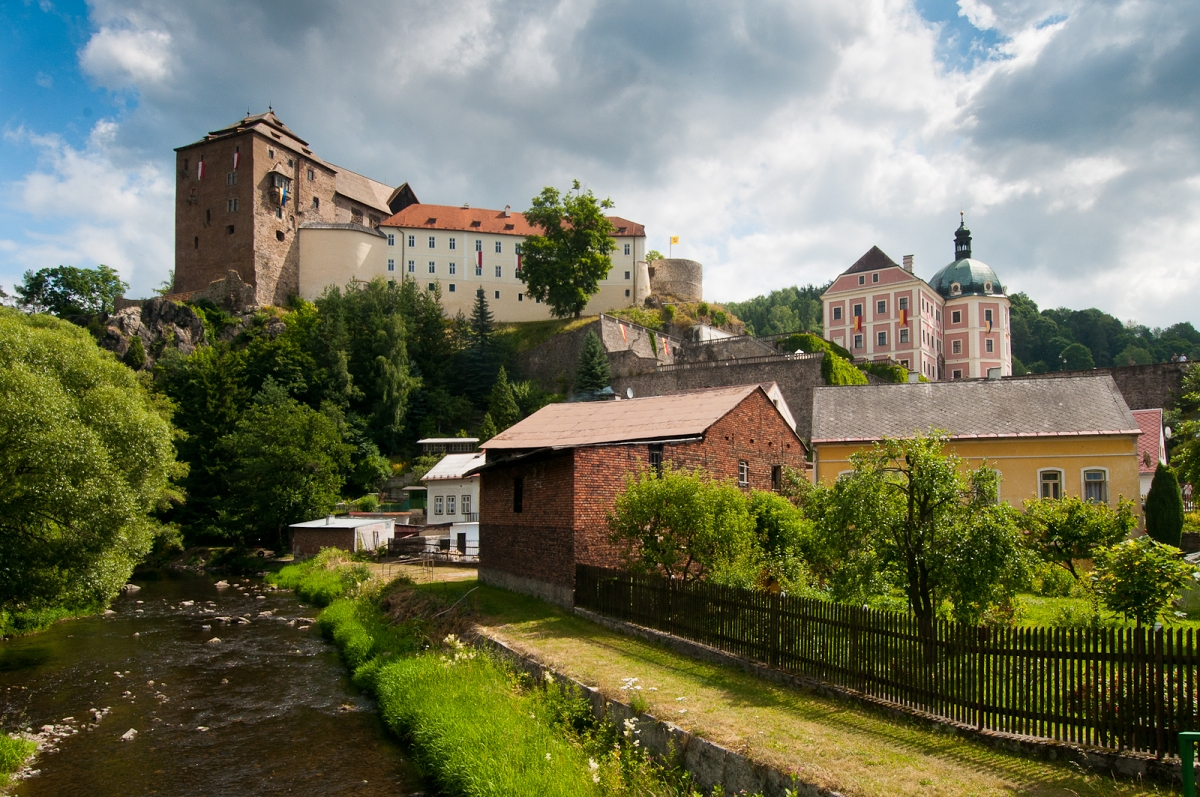
Bečov Castle and Bečov Chateau

The I/20 road (part of the European route E49) from Plzeň to Karlovy Vary runs through Bečov nad Teplou.

Bečov nad Teplou is located on the regional railway line from Karlovy Vary to Mariánské Lázně. It is also the starting point of the lines to Rakovník and to Žlutice.

== Sights ==
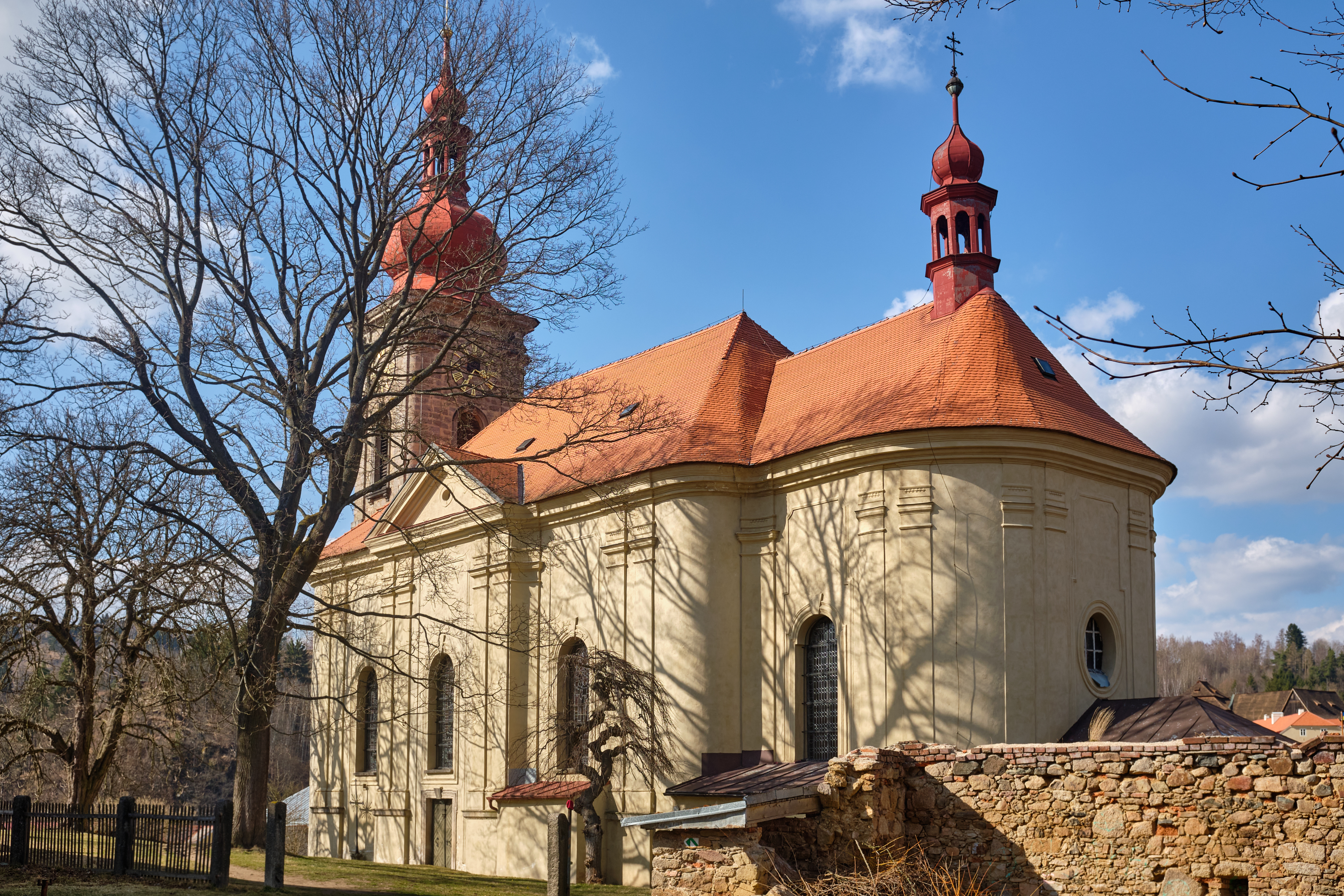
Church of Saint George

Bečov nad Teplou is known for the complex of Bečov Castle and Bečov Chateau, which is protected as a national cultural monument. The complex is open to the public and offers guided tours. The exposition contains the second most valuable movable monument in the Czech Republic, which is the Reliquary of St. Maurus.

The Church of Saint George was built in the late Baroque style in 1763–1767. The tower was finished in 1885.

A notable landmark is the late Baroque town hall. It dates from 1760.

A botanical garden was gradually created in Bečov nad Teplou during the period 1918–1935. After the garden was acquired by the Czechoslovak state in 1945, it gradually fell ito disrepair. In 2005, the local botanical organisation ČSOP Berkut decided to recover and maintain the botanical garden.

== Notable people ==
- August Labitzky (1832–1903), composer and kapellmeister
- Eduard Götzl (1921–1986), German-Czech politician

== Twin towns – sister cities ==
Bečov nad Teplou is twinned with:

- Eschenburg, Germany

== Gallery ==
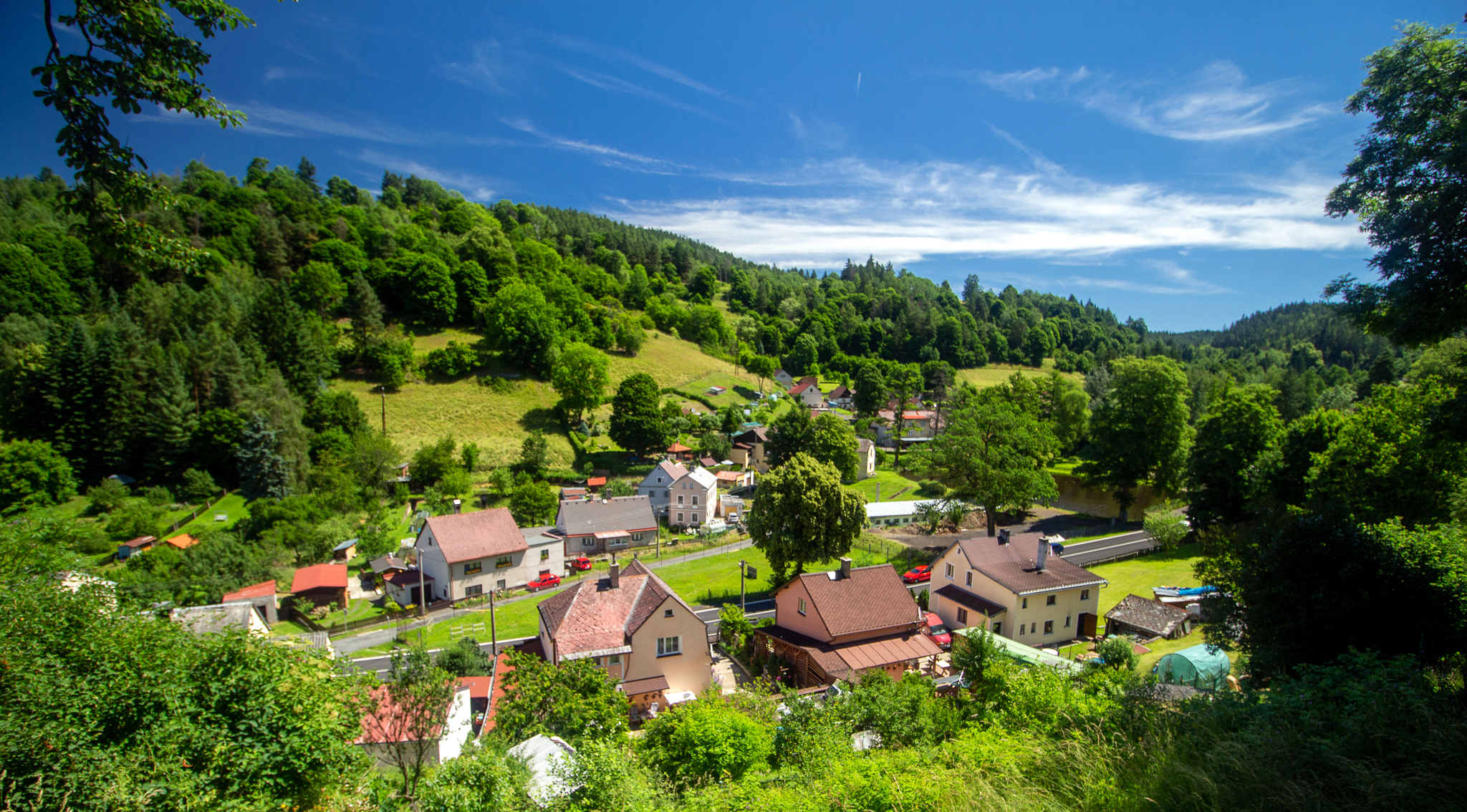
Lower part of Bečov nad Teplou

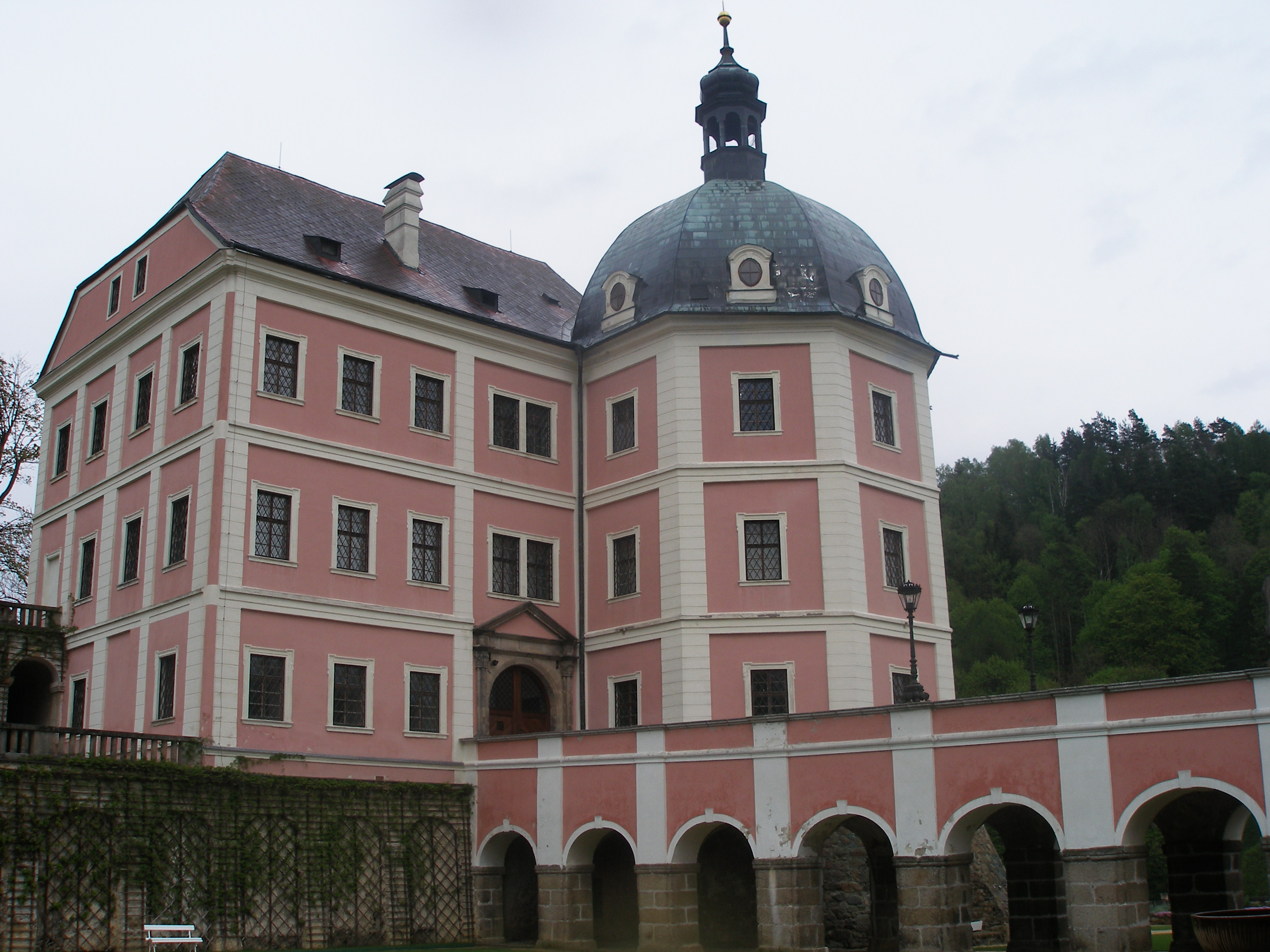
Gate house of Bečov Castle

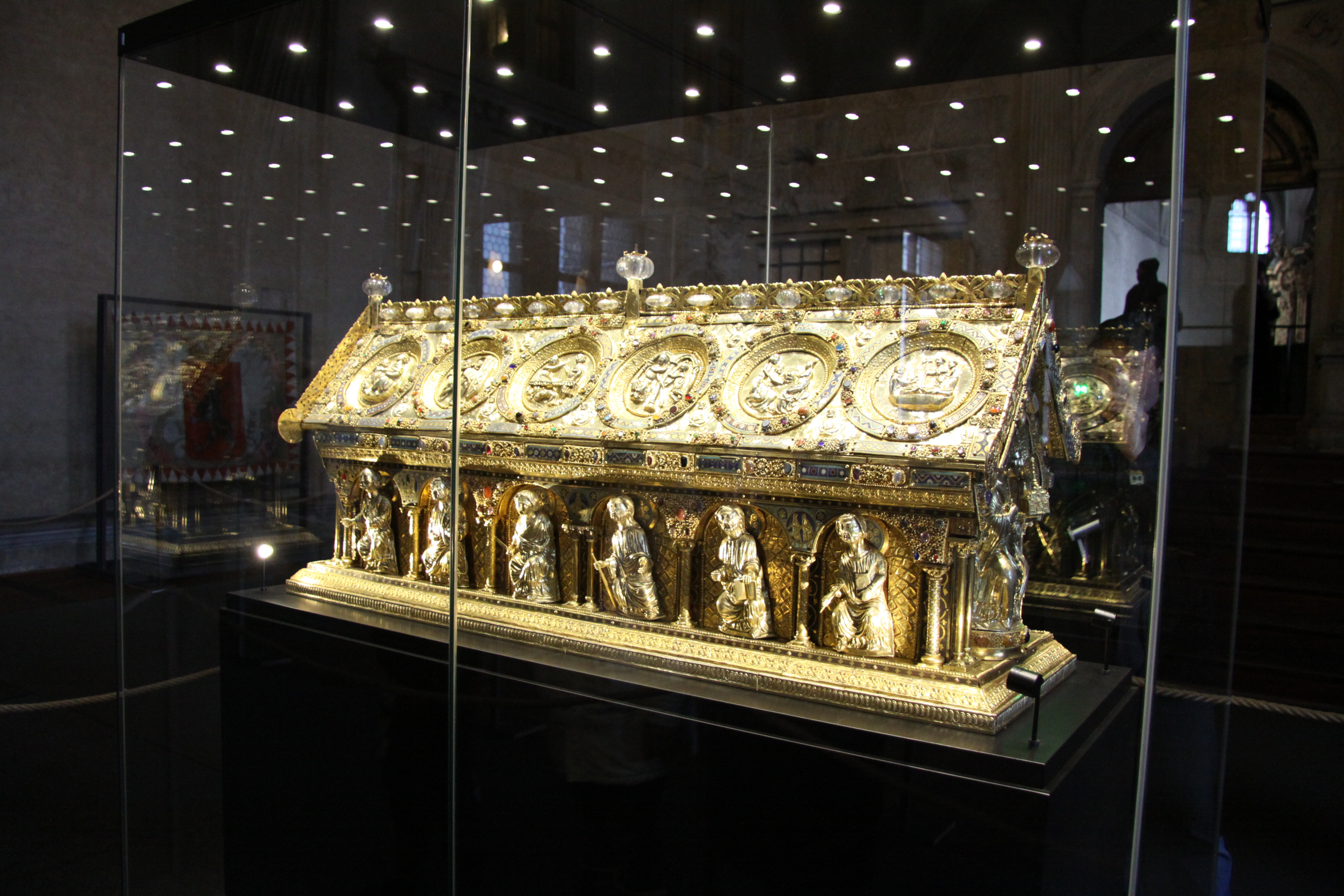
Reliquary of St. Maurus
