= Tatra 80 =

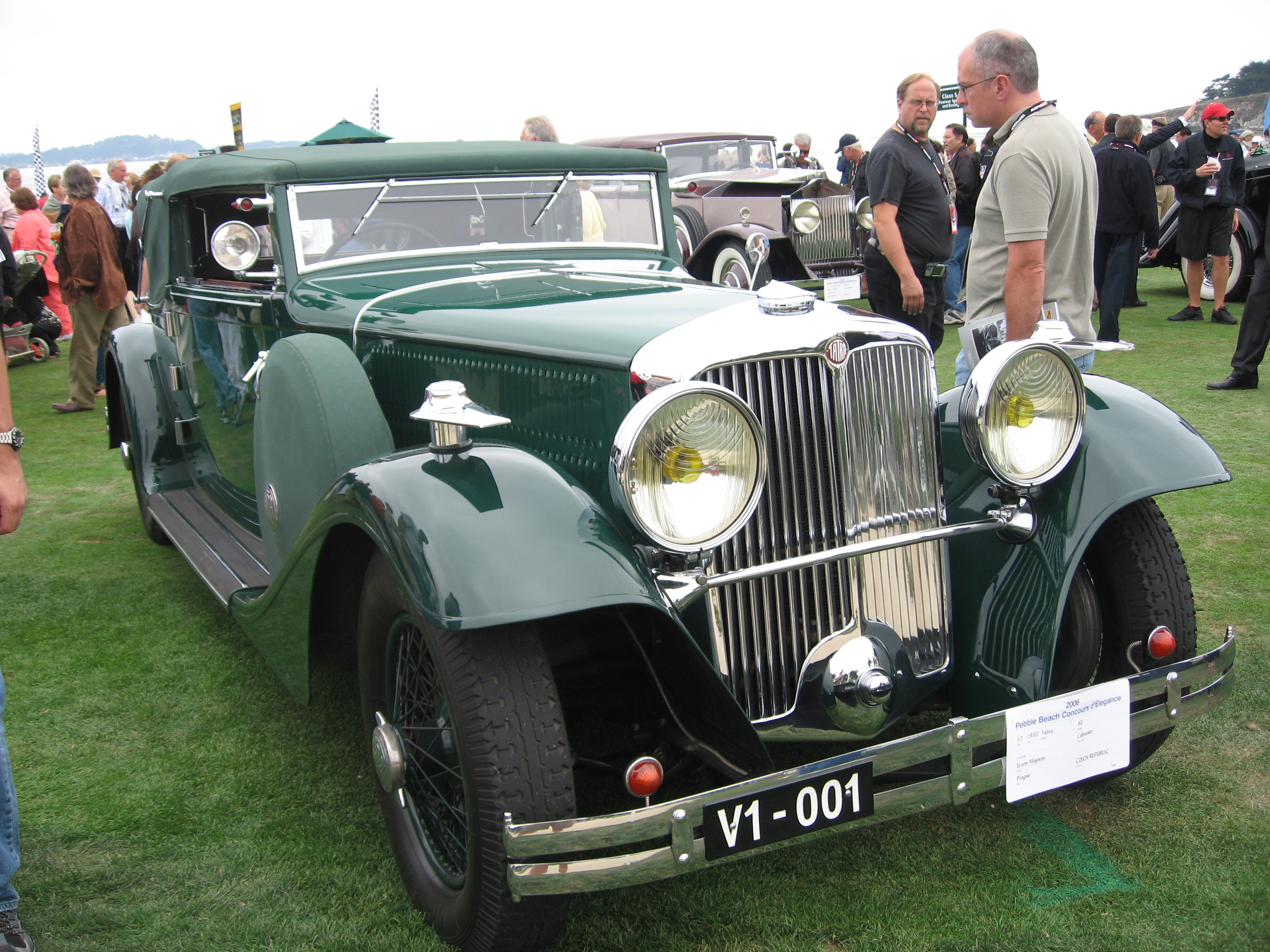
- Tatra 80 two-door convertible

Overview
- Manufacturer: Tatra
- Production: 1931–1935; 25 produced
- Designer: Hans Ledwinka

Body and chassis
- Class: Luxury full-size car
- Body style: sedan, convertible, limousine, landaulet
- Layout: FR layout
- Chassis: Backbone chassis
- Related: Tatra 70

Powertrain
- Engine: 5,990 cc Tatra 80 V12
- Transmission: 4-speed manual

Dimensions
- Curb weight: 2,500 kg (5,500 lb)

The Tatra 80 is a Czechoslovak luxury full-size car built by Tatra between 1931 and 1935.

== History ==
Hans Ledwinka designed the car in 1930. It was launched in 1931, the same year as the Tatra 70, and the two models have the same backbone chassis and swing axle suspension. The brakes are by ATE-Lockheed. The Type 80 has wire wheels, whereas the Type 70 has disc wheels.

But the underlying difference is the engine. The Type 70 was built with a 3,406 cc six-cylinder OHC engine, but the Type 80 was given a 5,990 cc, 65-degree V-12 with horizontal valves operated directly by a top camshaft mounted at the level of the cylinder heads. The engine produces 120 hp (89 kW), giving the car a top speed of 130 kilometres per hour (81 mph).

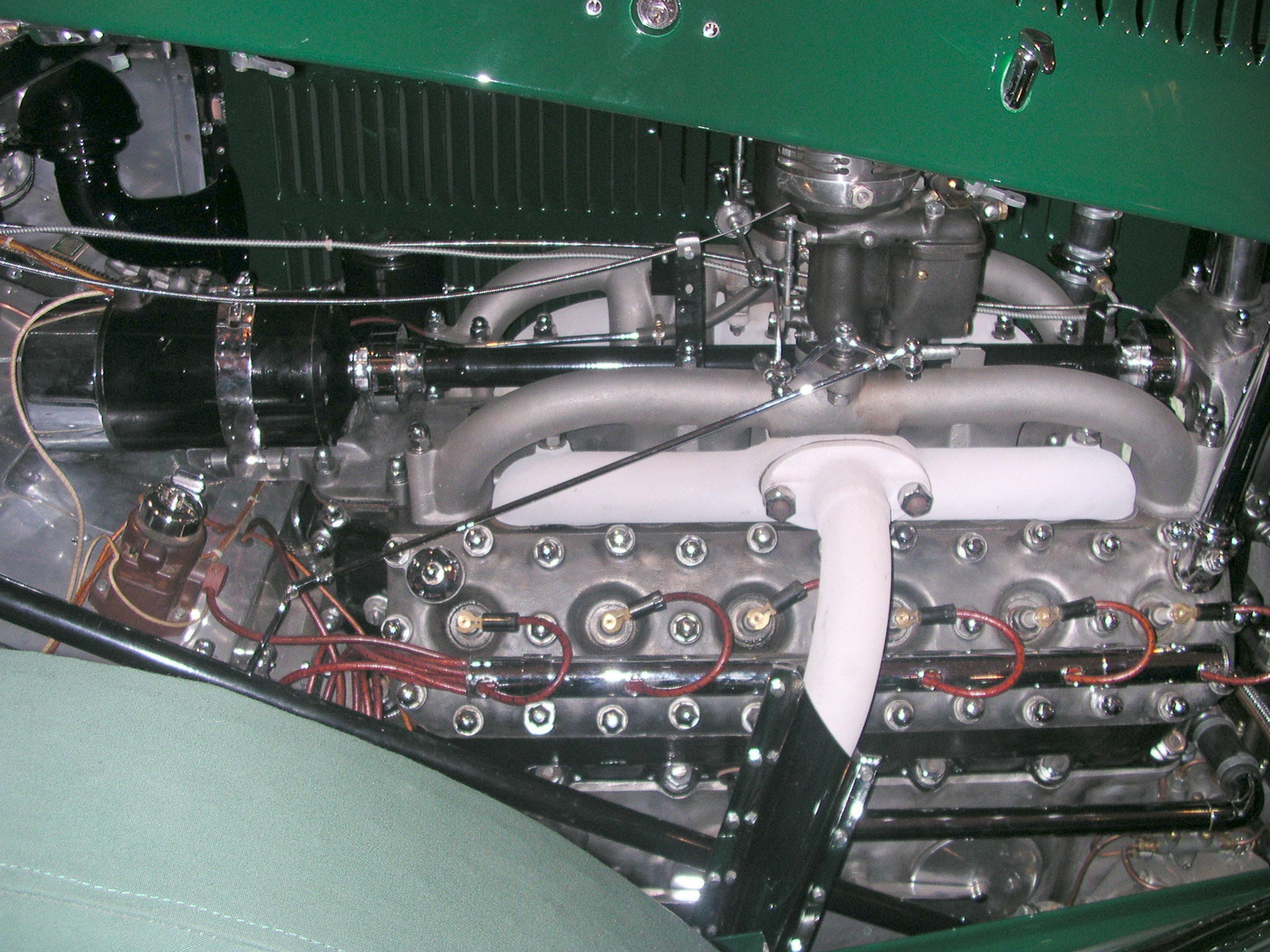
Tatra T80 V12 engine

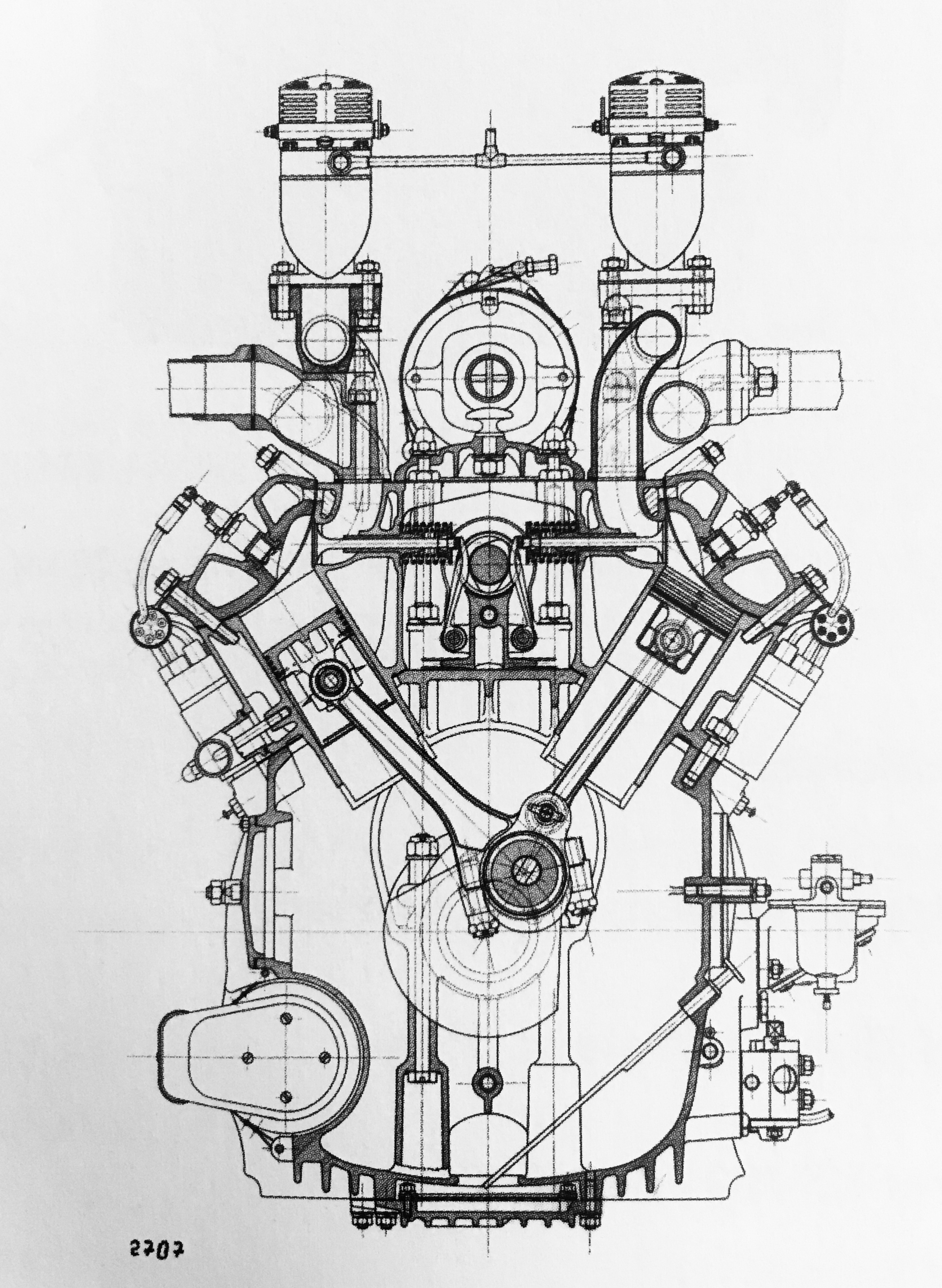
Tatra 80 engine section

Tatra supplied the bare rolling chassis, engine and transmission. Customers chose a body style and which coachbuilding company would build it. Four-door sedans, cabriolets and six-seat limousines were built. There is at least one example of a two-door, four-seat convertible. Sodomka of Vysoké Mýto built bodies for several Type 80 cars.

The Type 80 was Tatra's most luxurious and expensive car, priced at Kčs 195,000 to 200,000.

Tatra built 22 Type 80 cars between 1931 and 1935.

== Presidential landaulet ==
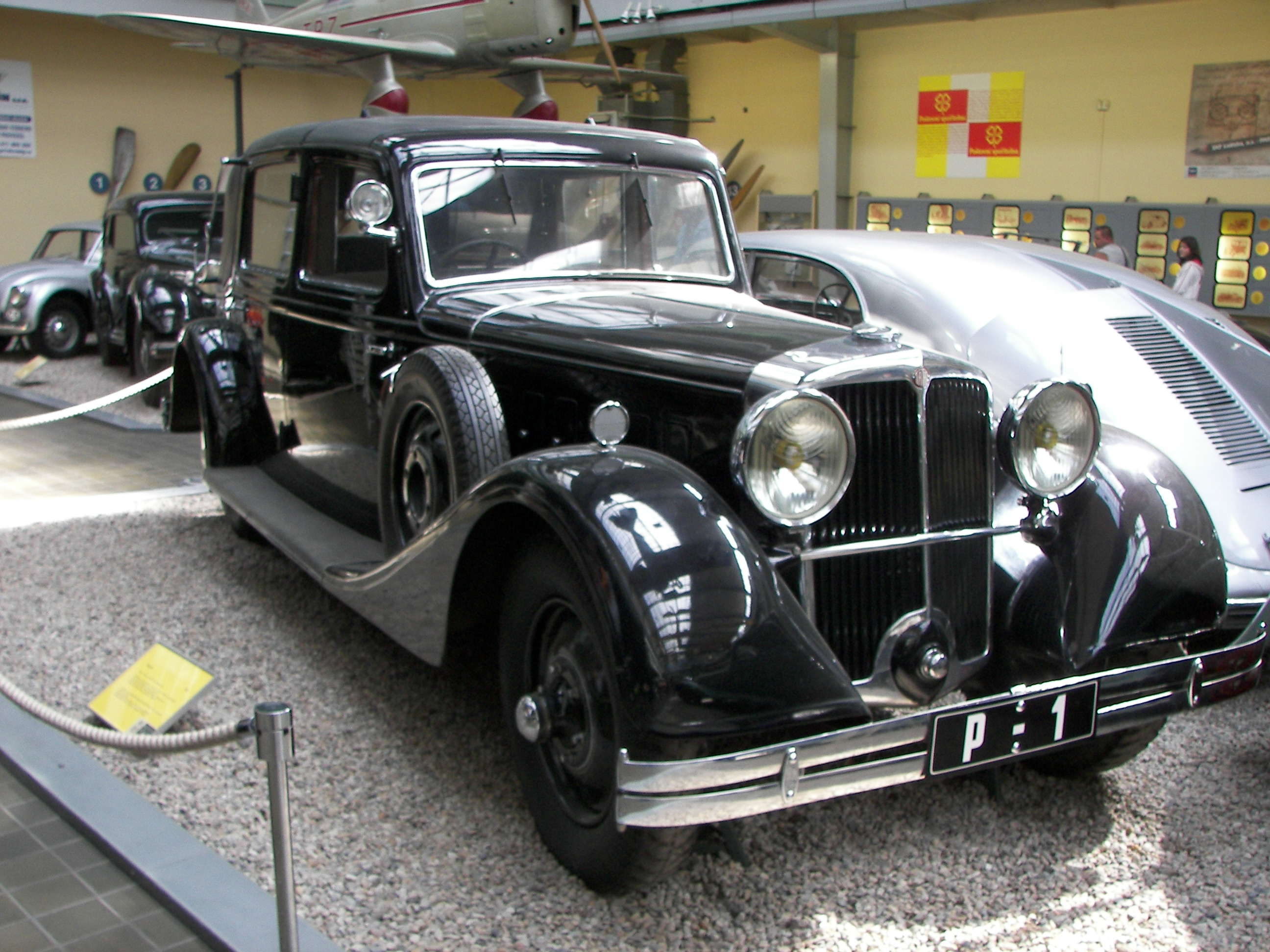
1935 landaulet built for TG Masaryk

In 1935 a unique Tatra 80 landaulet was built as the official state car of Czechoslovak President TG Masaryk. On 18 April 2005 it was presented to the National Technical Museum in Prague. On 29 September 2005 the Czech Republic declared that a set of five historic cars, including the Presidential landaulet, to be a national cultural monument.

== Bibliography ==
- Gomola, Miroslav (2001). Tatra Automobiles – Luxury Cars from Koprivnice 1920–1940. Bohemia Hobbies. ISBN 80-85991187.
- Schmarbeck, Wolfgang (1977). Tatra, Die Geshichte Tatra Automobile (in German). Bad Oeynhausen: Verlag des Internationalen Auto und Motorrad-Museums. ASIN B015S8O2OS.
- Tuček, Jan (2017). Auta první republiky 1918–1938 (in Czech). Prague: Grada Publishing. pp. 159–160, 285–286. ISBN 978-80-271-0466-6.
- Kasík, Pavel (2023). Tatra 80 – Three Lives of Schicht's Famous Cabriolet. Brno: Tatra Heritage. ISBN 978-80-11-03087-2.
