= National Technical Museum =

Czech technology museum

- Národní technické muzeum

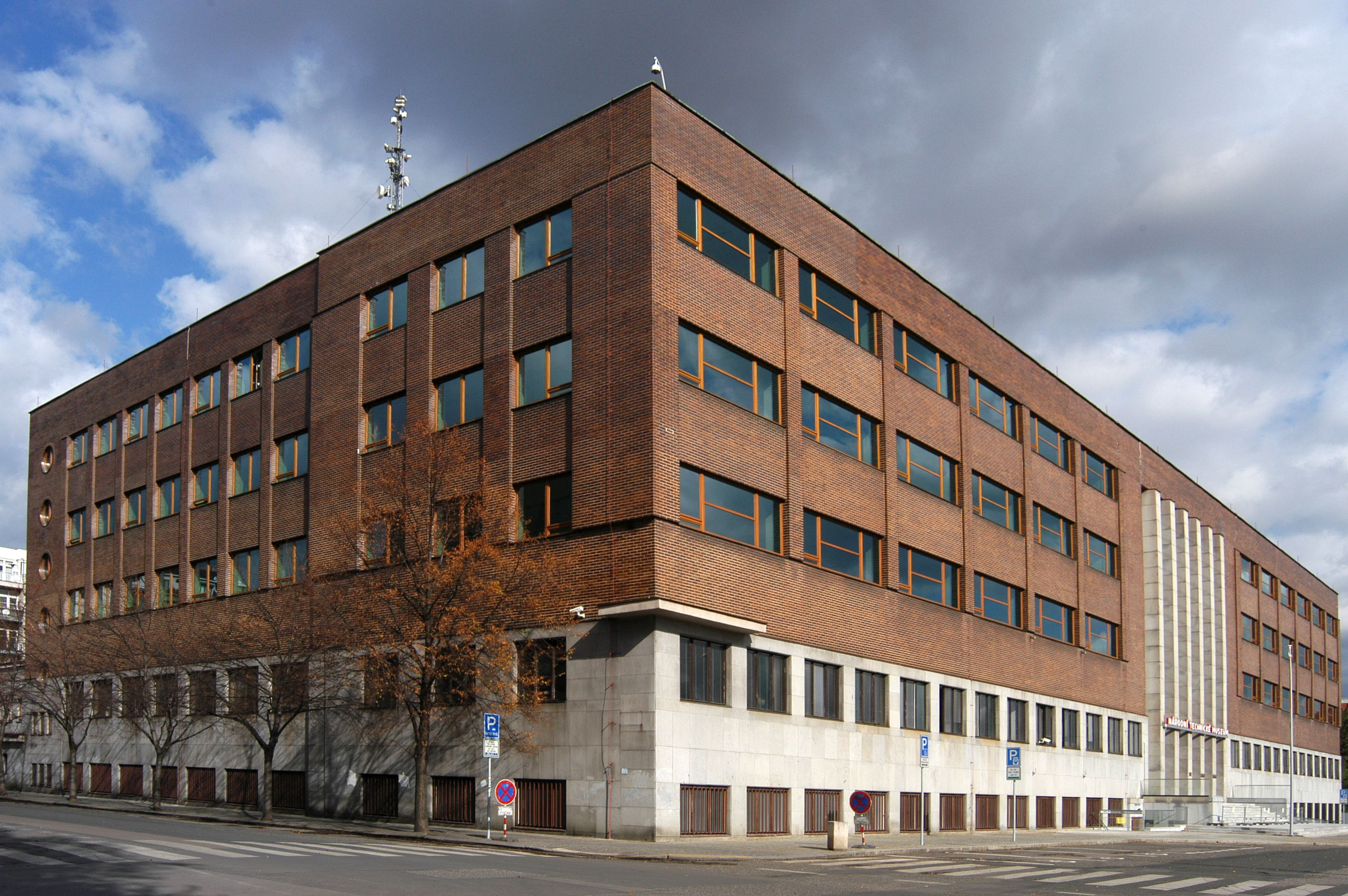
- Main building on Letná

- Location within Prague
- Established: 5 July 1908
- Location: Kostelní 1320/42, Prague, Czech Republic
- Coordinates: 50°05′50.09″N 14°25′29.02″E
- Type: Technology museum
- Visitors: 323,794 (2025; all sites)
- Director: Karel Ksandr
- Website: www.ntm.cz/en/

The National Technical Museum (Czech: Národní technické muzeum; NTM) in Prague is the largest technical museum in the Czech Republic. Founded in 1908, it documents the history of technology, science and industry in the Czech lands. Its collections cover fields including transport, astronomy, mechanical and electrical engineering, architecture, industrial design, photography and printing.

The museum opened its first public exhibitions in Schwarzenberg Palace in 1910. Its main building beside Letná Park, designed by Milan Babuška, first housed museum exhibitions in 1948. Alongside its exhibitions, the museum maintains historical and architectural archives and a specialist library, and conducts research into the history of science, technology and industry.

The museum also operates the Centre for Building Heritage in Plasy and the railway depository in Chomutov. The Postal Museum became part of NTM in 2026.

== History ==
The Technical Museum of the Kingdom of Bohemia was founded in 1908 through the initiative of professors at the Czech technical university in Prague and representatives of industry. Exhibits donated following the Prague Chamber of Commerce and Trade’s jubilee exhibition that year formed the basis of its collections. The museum association was divided into groups representing individual branches of industry. These groups acquired objects, prepared exhibitions and organized lectures and excursions. The first exhibitions opened to the public in Schwarzenberg Palace on 28 September 1910. Sugar industry engineers Karel Cyril Neumann and Hanuš Karlík helped build the collections and raise funds for the museum.

Prague’s Estates Engineering School and Polytechnic Institute, (both predecessors of the Czech Technical University) maintained technical collections already before the museum was founded. Another early collection belonged to Vojtěch Náprstek’s Czech Industrial Museum, which opened in 1874.

The Technical Museum began building its library in 1908 and industrial firms including Škoda Works and Daněk & Co. donated many publications to its new collection.

The museum was renamed the Czechoslovak Technical Museum in 1918 and fundraising for a new building began in 1921. In 1935, Milan Babuška won the architectural competition for the Technical and Agricultural museums on Letná. Construction of the Technical Museum started in 1938, but the German occupation authorities disrupted planned moving.

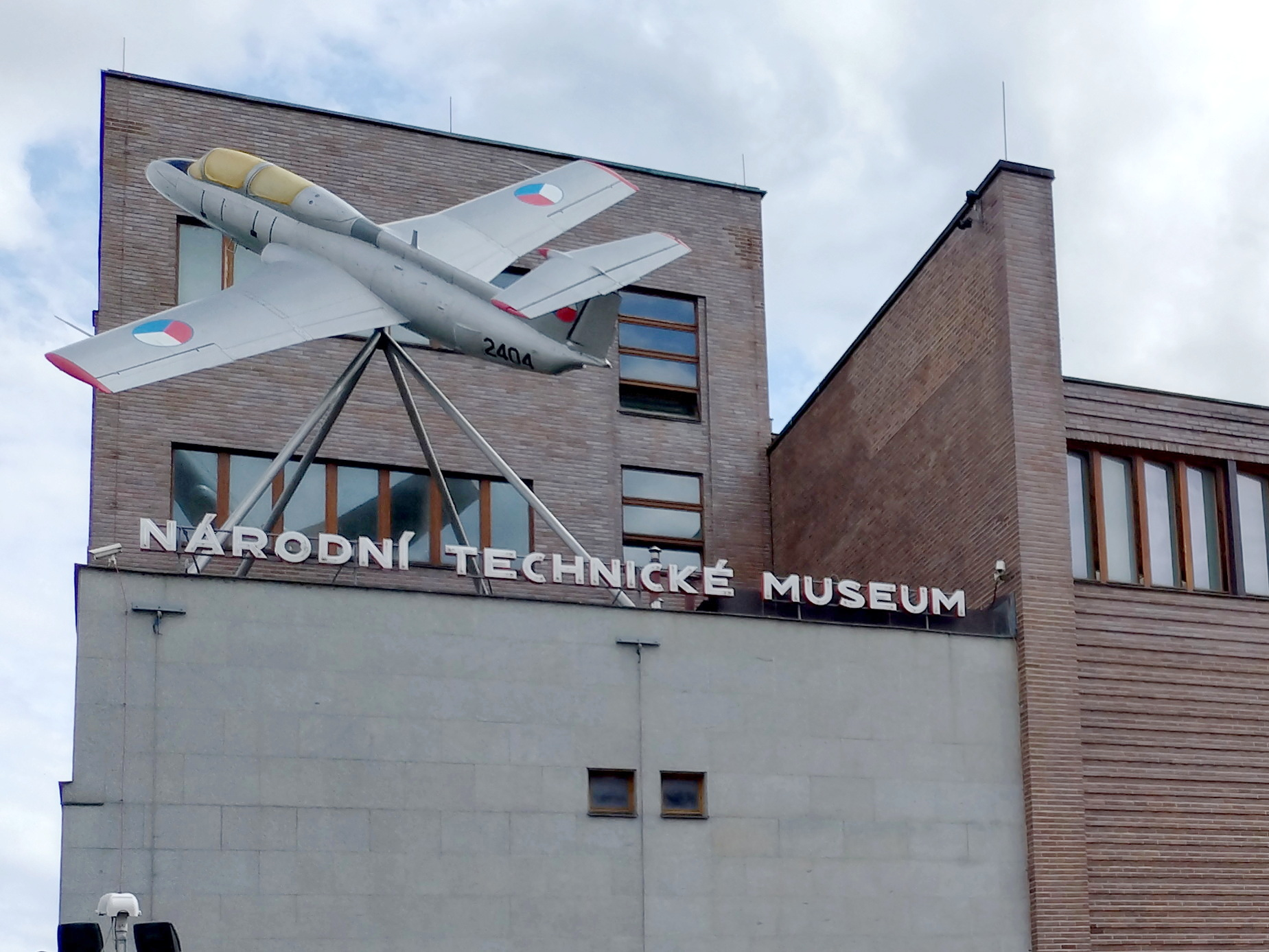
Aero L-29 Delfín on the NTM building

The museum’s collections were moved to Invalidovna in Karlín after it was forced to leave Schwarzenberg Palace in 1941. At Invalidovna, Zdeněk Wirth and Ladislav Machoň established the Archive of Architectural Production in 1942. After the war, the museum gained access to part of its Letná building and moved its cycling collection there in 1948. Other institutions occupied parts of the building until the late 1990s. In 1951, the state took over the museum, which was renamed the National Technical Museum. The Brno branch became a separate institution in 1961, taking the name Technical Museum in Brno. In 1969, NTM established a department for the history of technology, which organized publications, seminars and conferences. In 1972, the museum hosted a meeting in Prague at which ICOM’s committee for science and technology museums, CIMUSET, was reorganized. Museum director Josef Kuba chaired the committee from 1971 to 1977 and again from 1983 to 1989

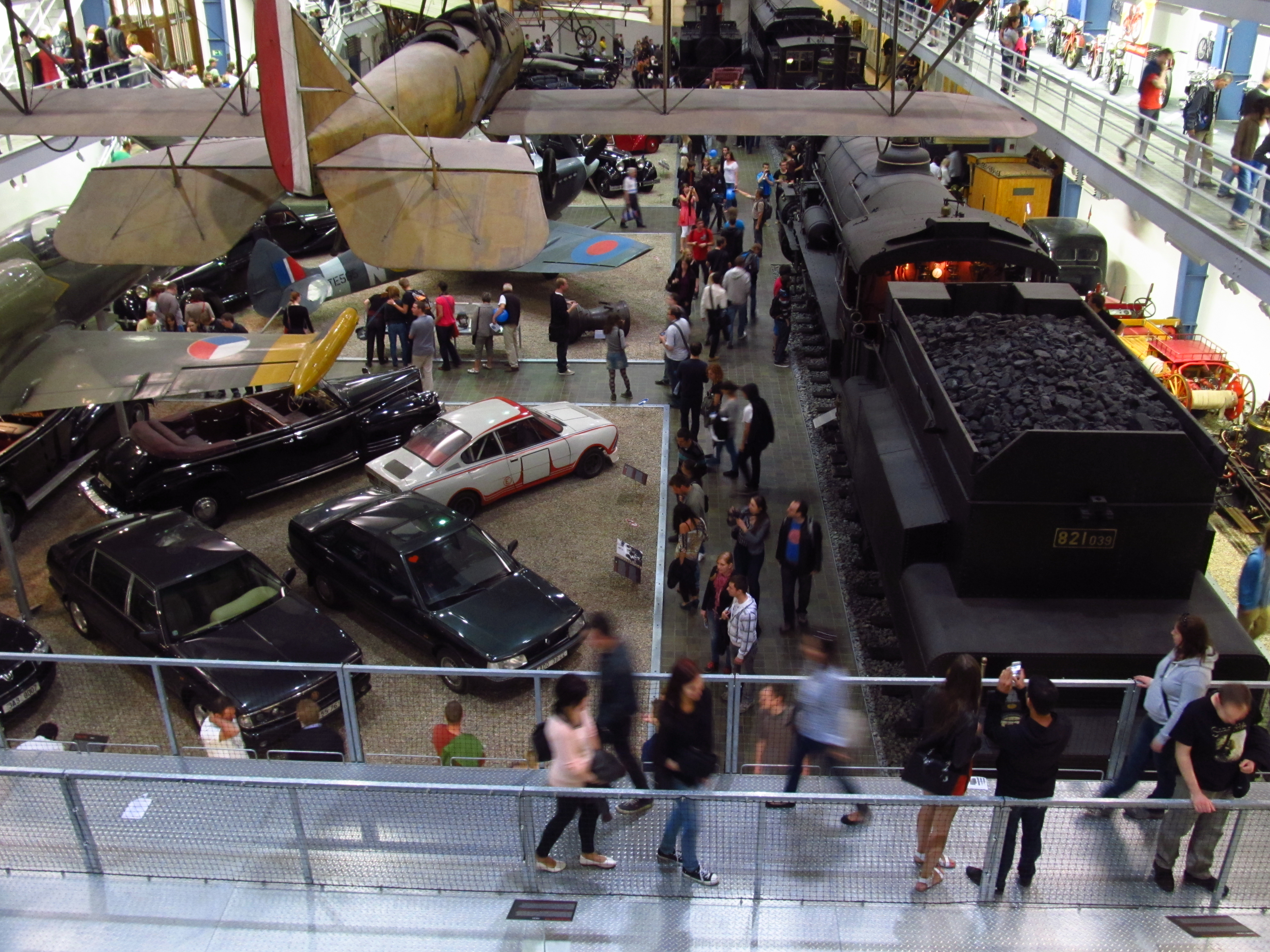
Inside the National Technical Museum

In 1995, three new galleries opened: Industrial Design, Single Building and Fine Arts. The fine arts gallery presented paintings and sculptures relating to industry, science and technology.

In August 2002, floodwater entered the museum’s storage rooms at Invalidovna, damaging collections and more than 80 per cent of the architectural archive. The damaged documents were frozen before being dried and cleaned. Most of the archive was saved, although drying took until 2011. The archive was later moved to new storage facilities at Čelákovice.

Renovation of the main building began in 2003. The museum closed to visitors in September 2006 and reopened on 16 February 2011. The museum reopened with five permanent exhibitions covering transport, architecture and construction, astronomy, printing and photography. The remaining exhibitions followed, with the last opening in October 2013.

== Selected exhibits ==
The aircraft of aviation pioneer Jan Kašpar is displayed in the transport hall. It was used for his flight from Pardubice to Velká Chuchle on 13 May 1911. The cars on display include President Tomáš Garrigue Masaryk’s 1935 Tatra 80 landaulet. Rudolf Caracciola’s winning Mercedes-Benz W154 from the 1939 German Grand Prix is also in the transport hall.

A model of a beet-sugar factory forms the centrepiece of the Sugar and Chocolate exhibition. The model was built for the Prague Chamber of Commerce and Trade’s exhibition in 1908. More than twenty engineering firms supplied parts for the factory, reproduced at one-tenth full size.

Two sextants in the museum’s astronomy collection are associated with Tycho Brahe and Johannes Kepler. Erasmus Habermel made one for Brahe and his collaborators in 1600.

On long-term loan from Kynžvart Castle, the Kynžvart daguerreotype is displayed in the photographic exhibition. Louis Daguerre made the still-life photograph in 1839 and presented it to Austrian Chancellor Klemens von Metternich. It was inscribed on UNESCO’s Memory of the World Register in 2017.

The museum’s collection includes the polarograph that Jaroslav Heyrovský and Masuzo Shikata designed in 1924. An early machine developed by Otto Wichterle to make soft contact lenses dates from 1961. Visitors can also see a working model made by Jiří Mládek using parts from a Merkur construction kit.

== Exhibits ==
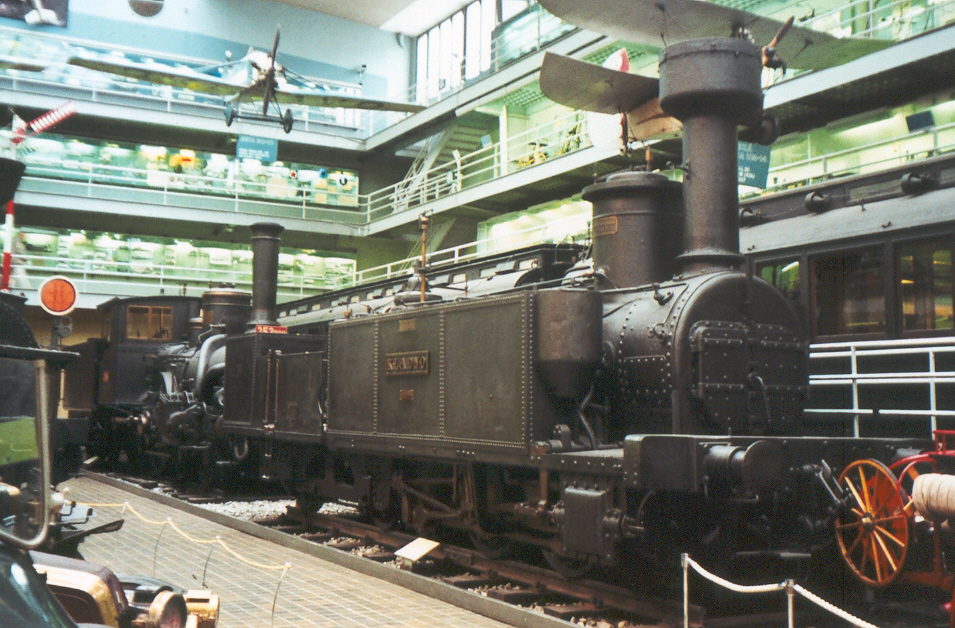
Locomotive Kladno (1855)

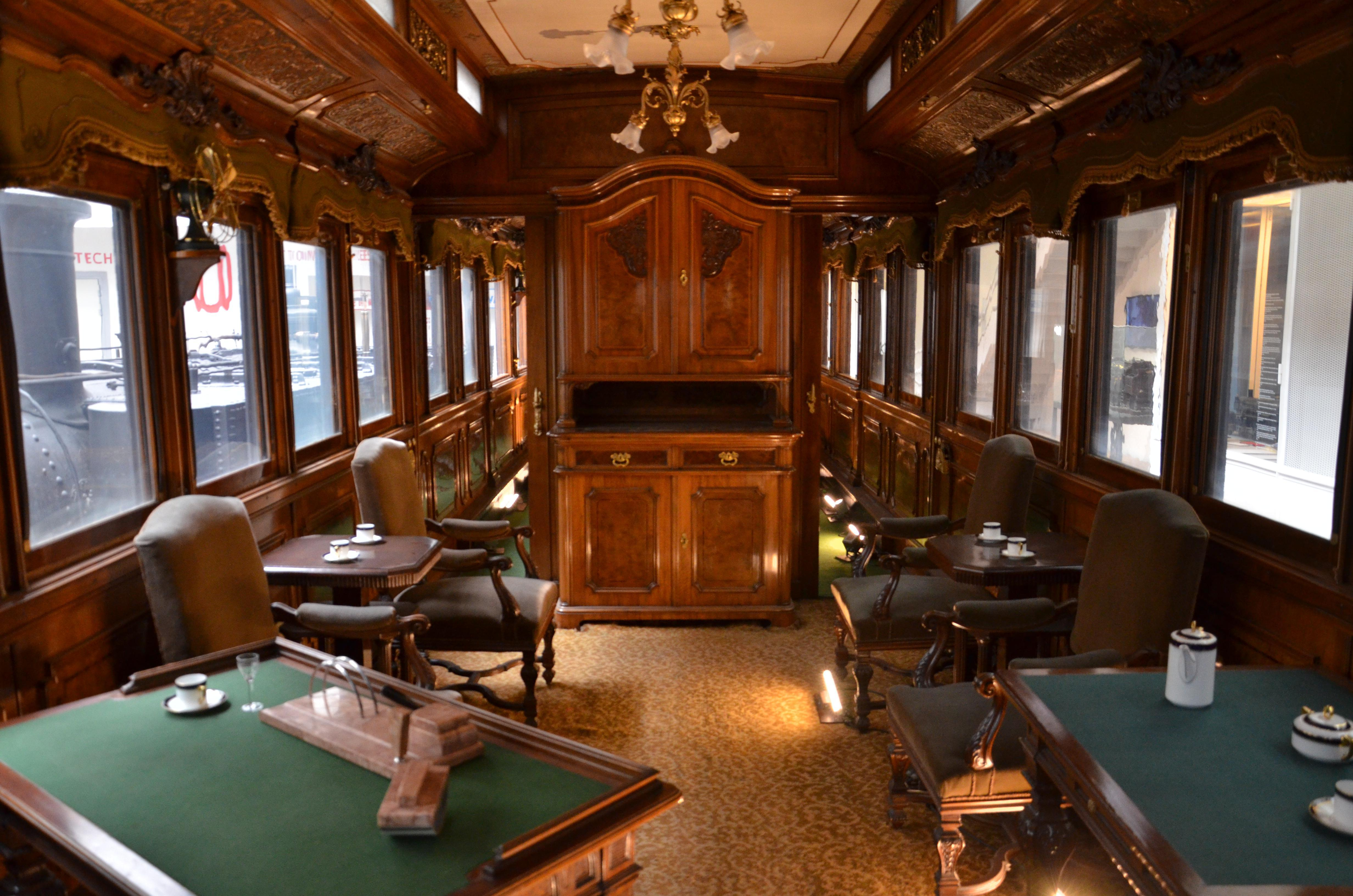
Interior of salon car of Franz Joseph I

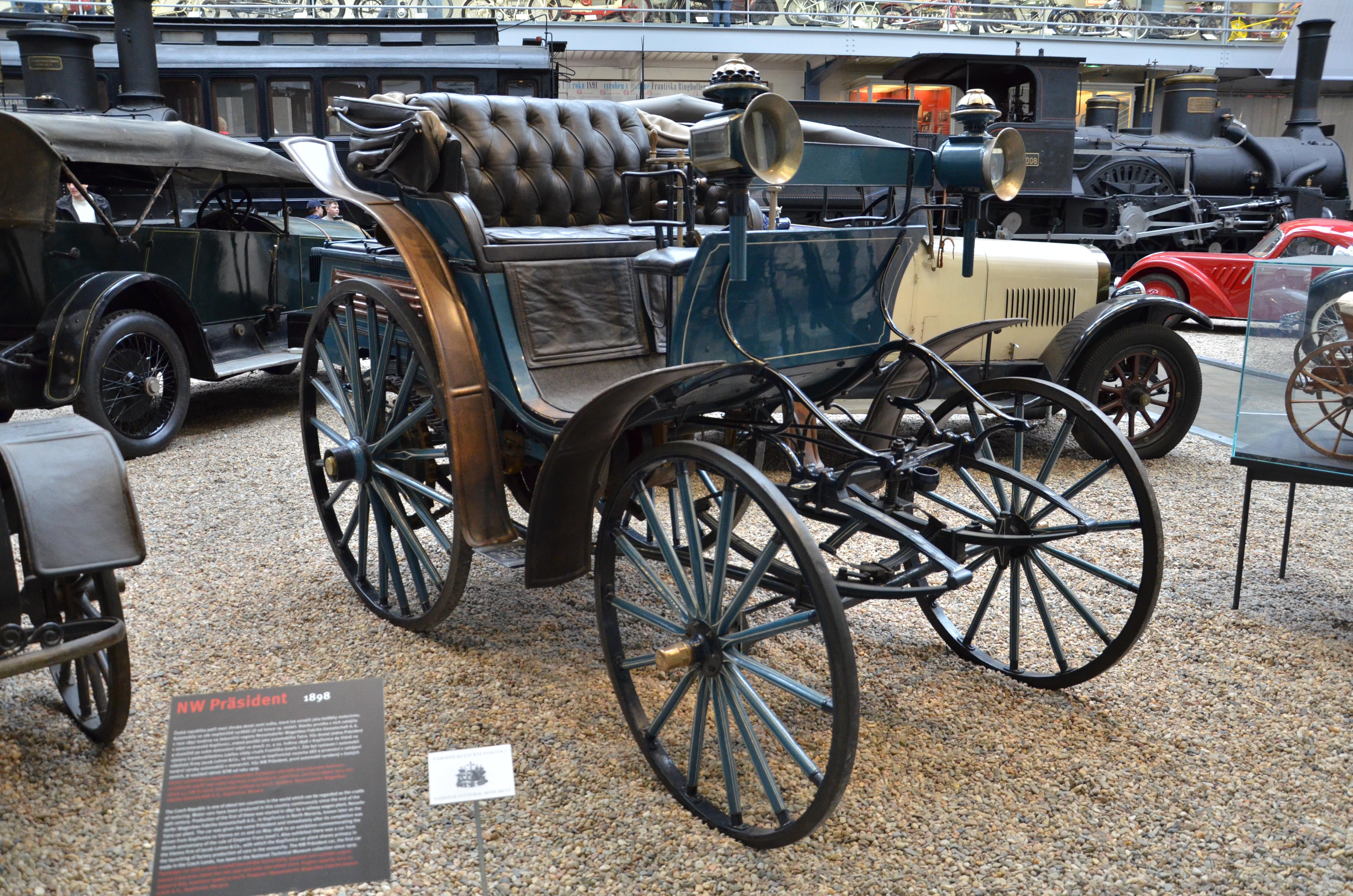
Benz Viktoria (1893)

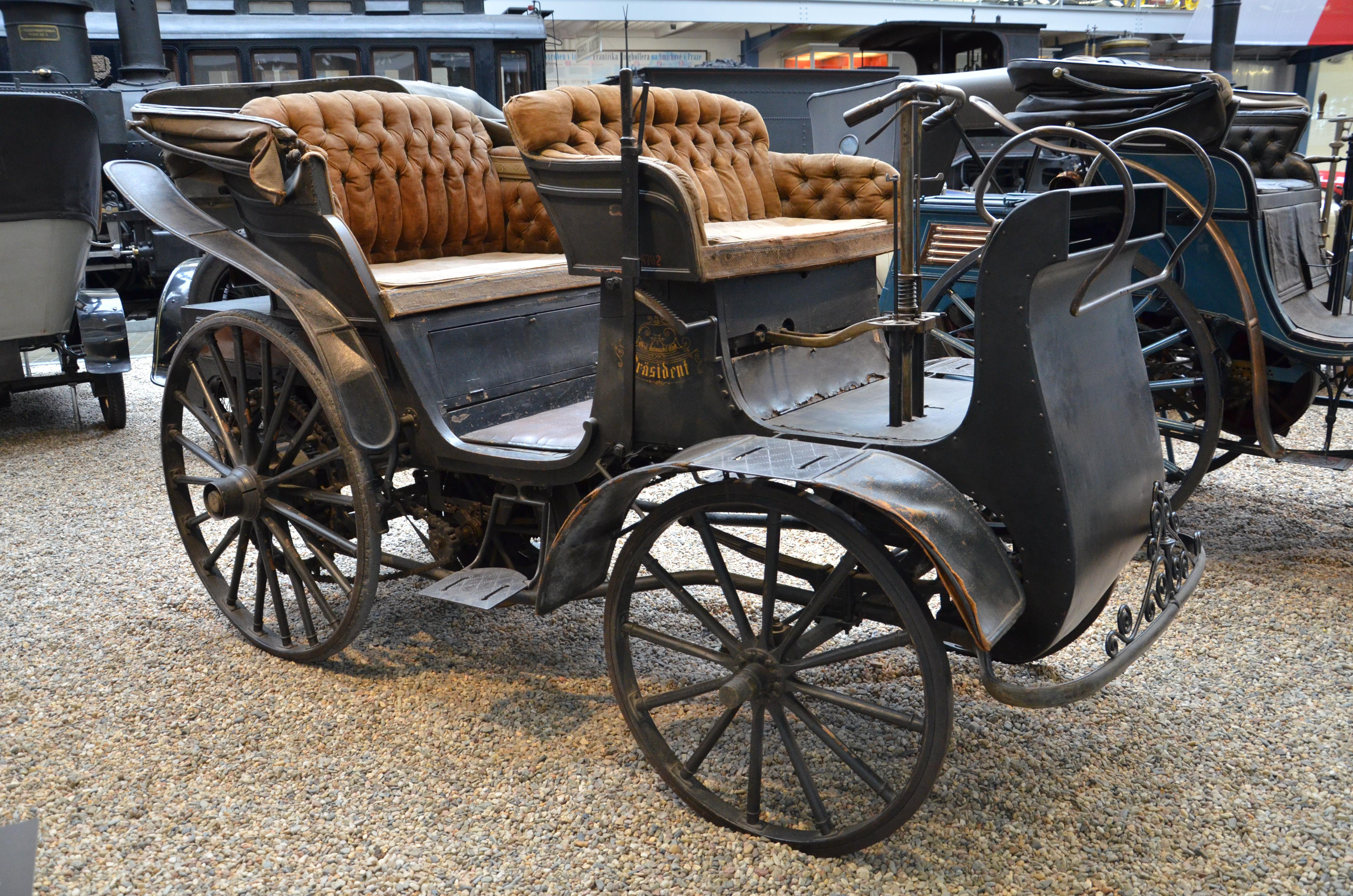
NW Präsident (1898)

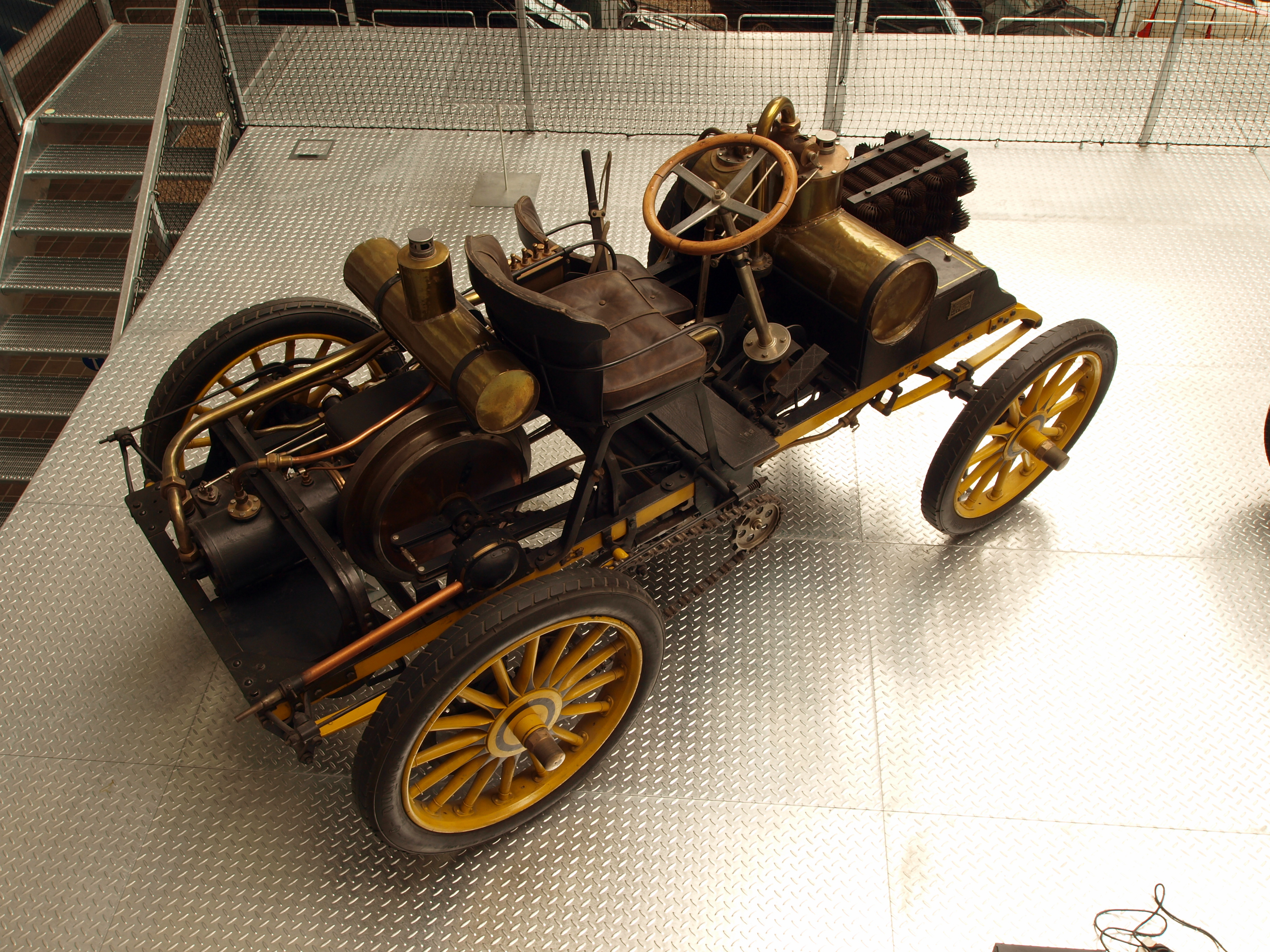
NW 12 HP Rennzweier (1900), race car of Theodor von Liebieg

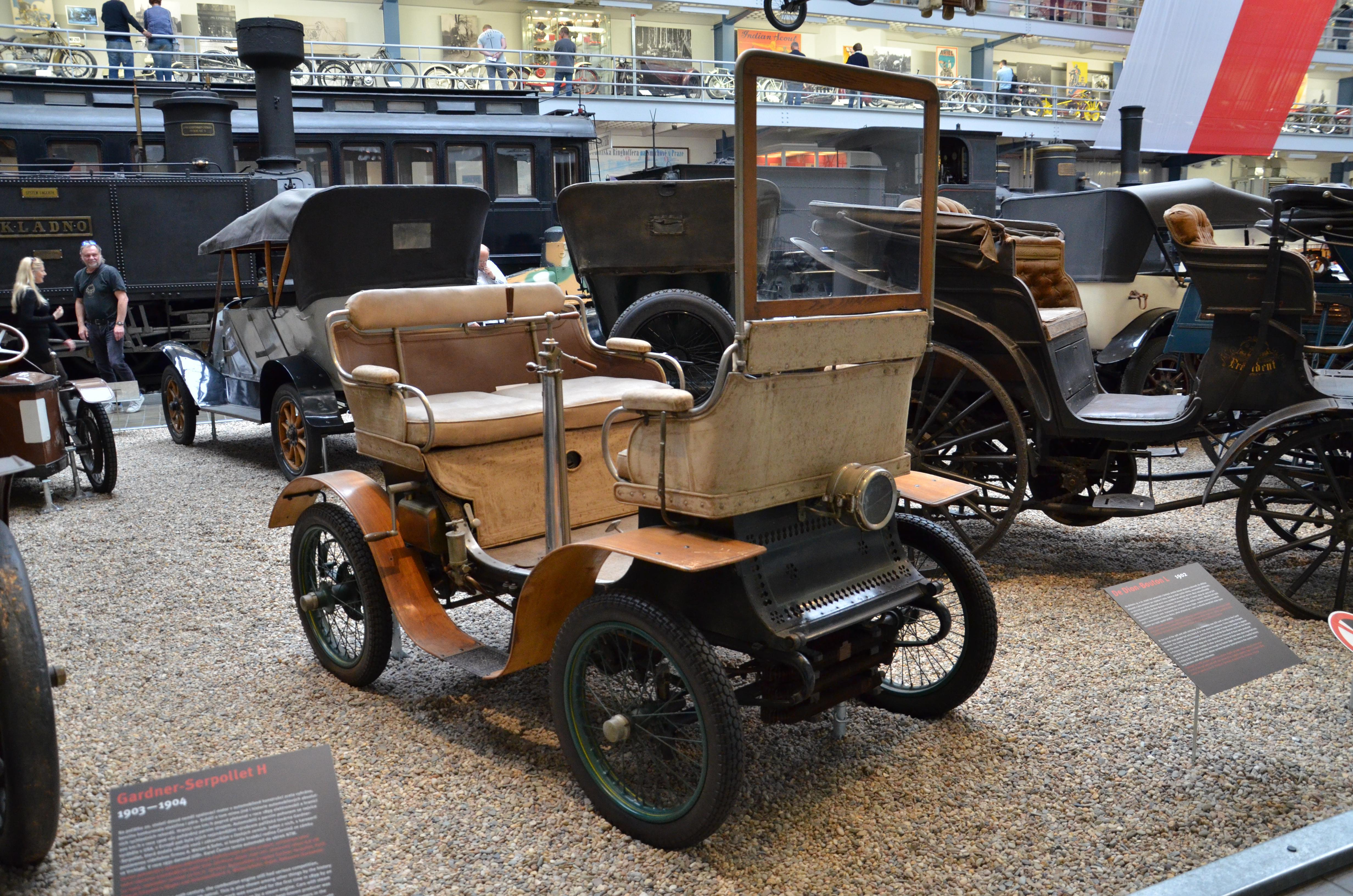
De Dion-Bouton L (1902)

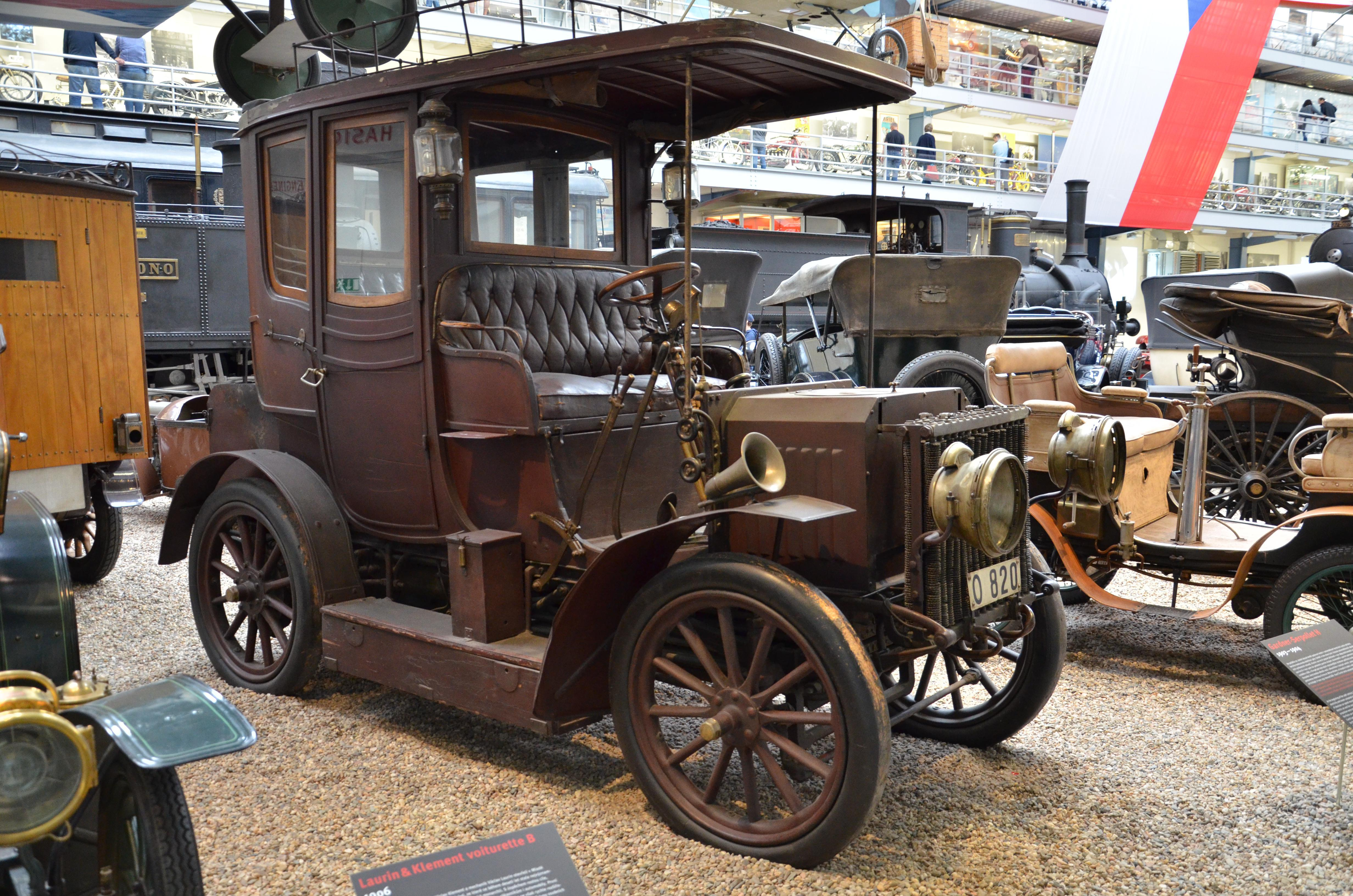
Gardner-Serpollet H (1903-1904)

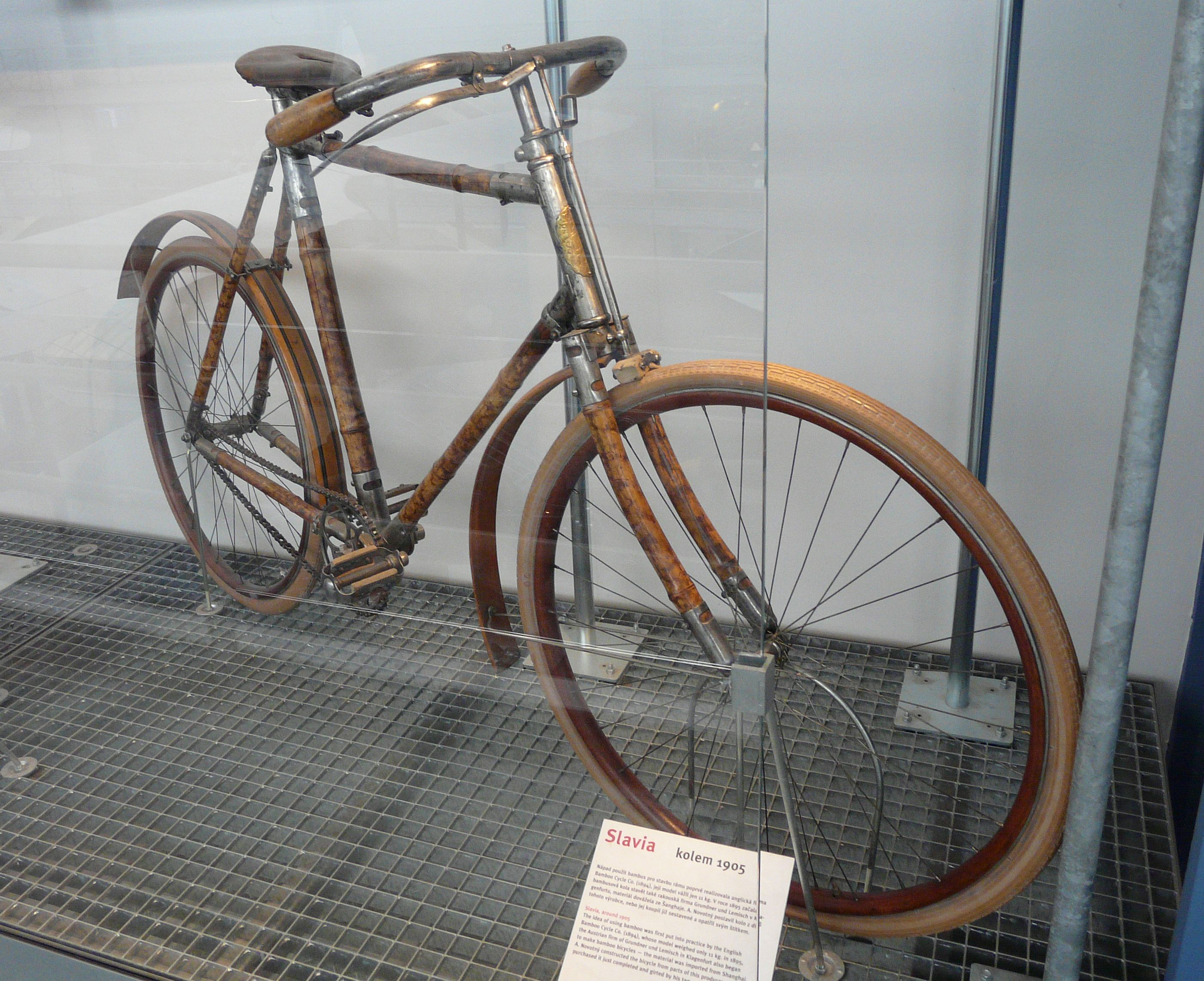
Bike Slavia (1905)

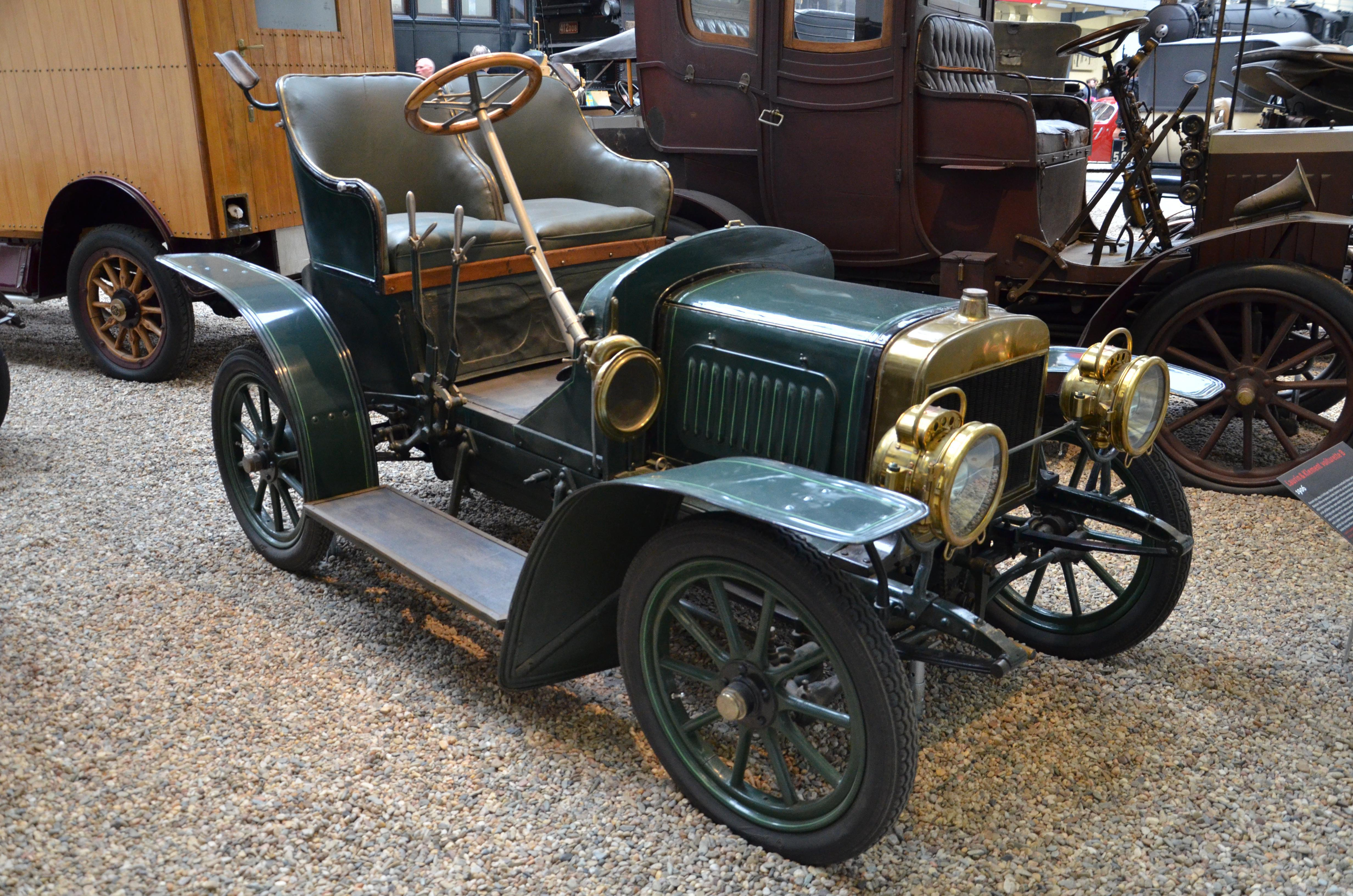
Laurin & Klement voiturette B (1906)

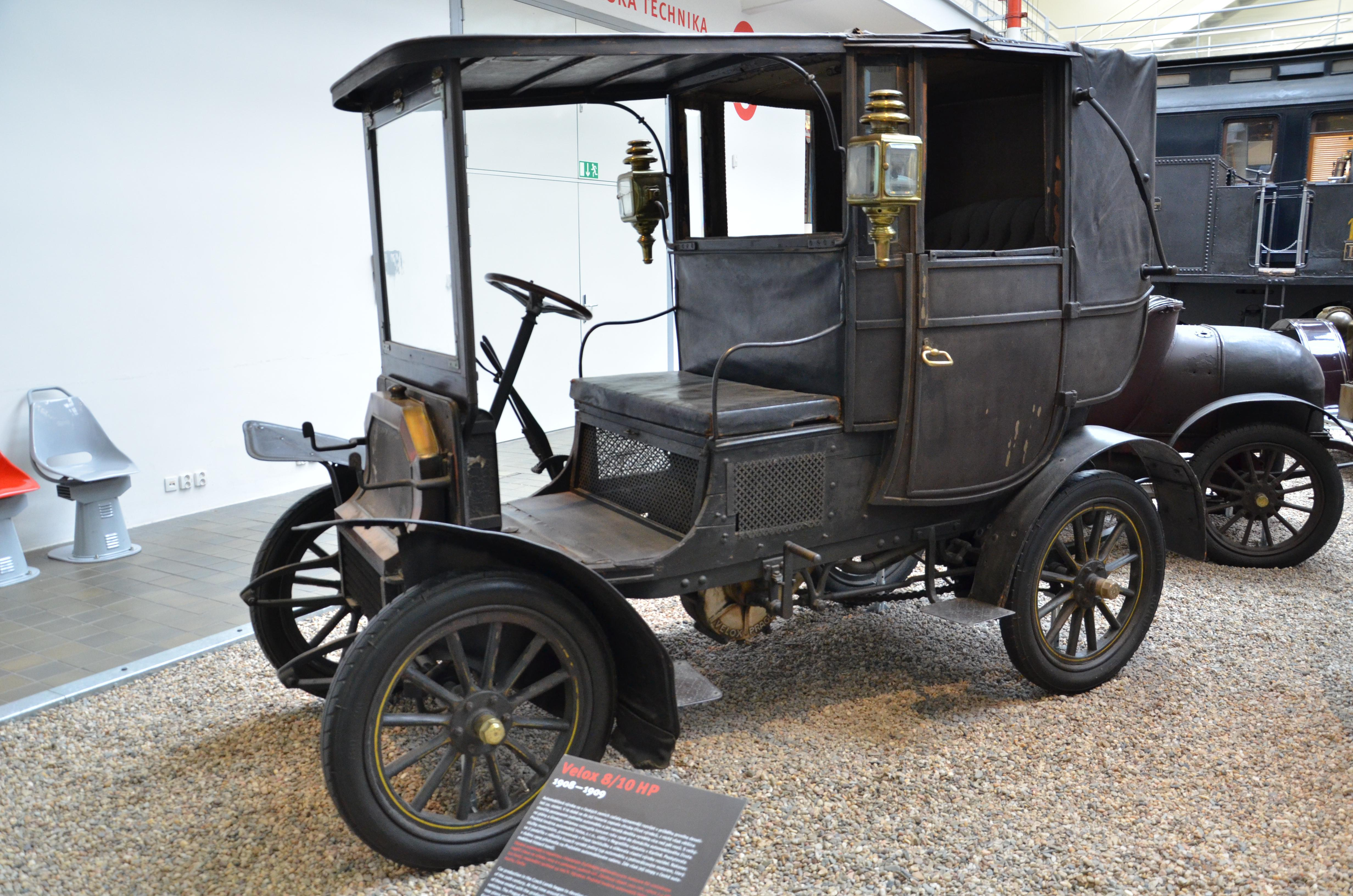
Velox 8/10 HP (1908-1909)

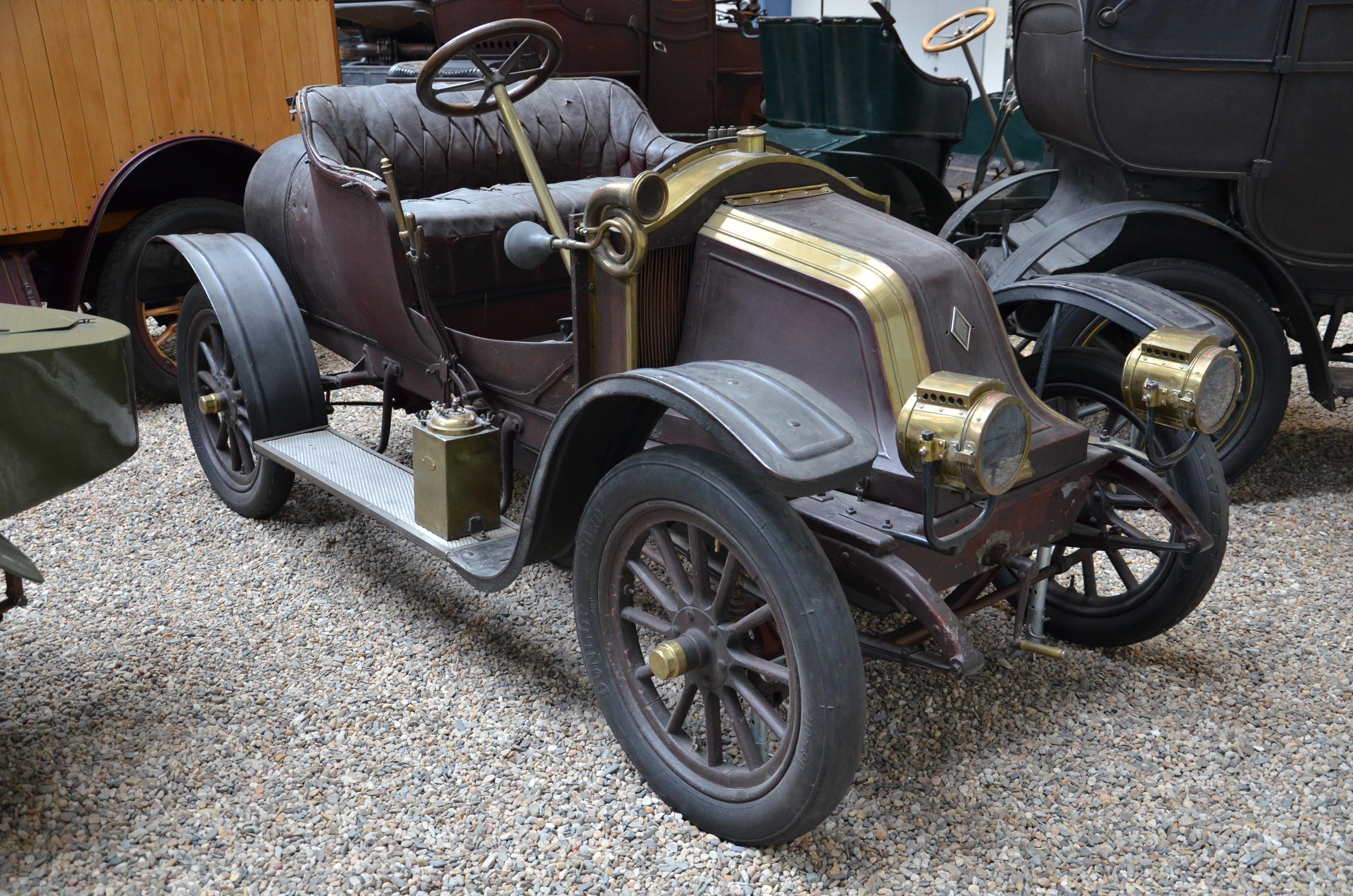
Renault AX (1909)

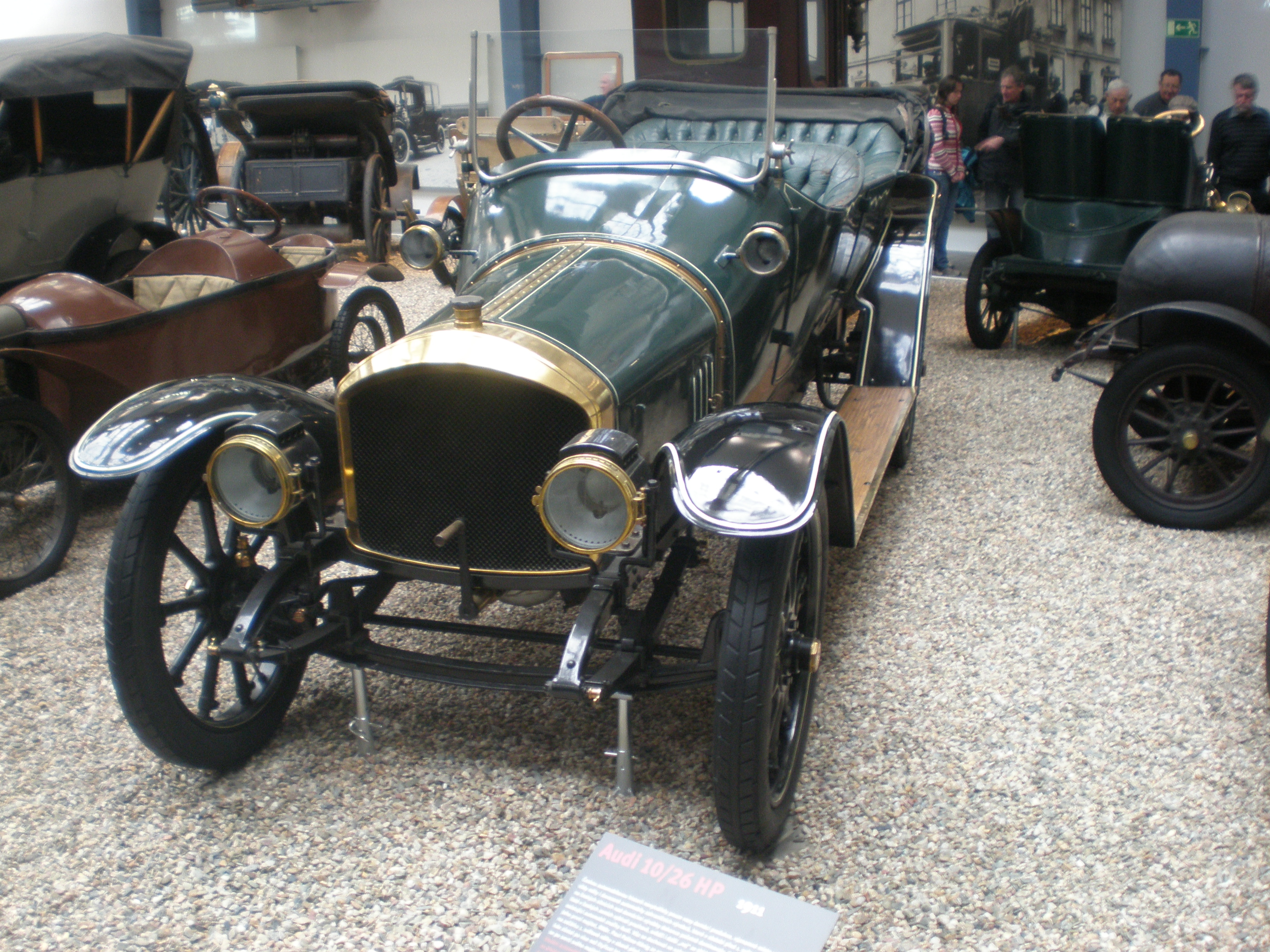
Audi 10/26 PS A (1910)

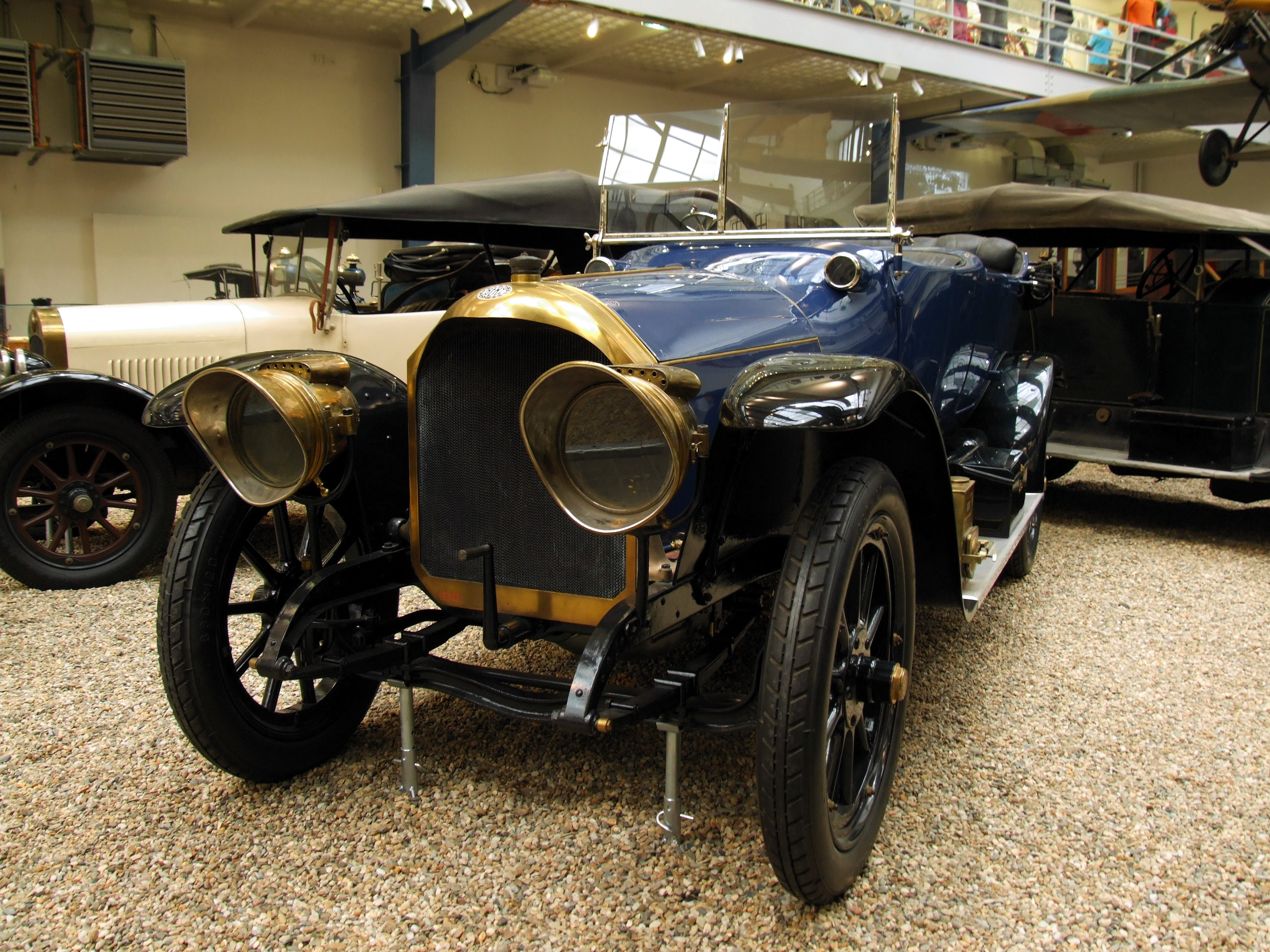
Benz 16/40 HP (1914)

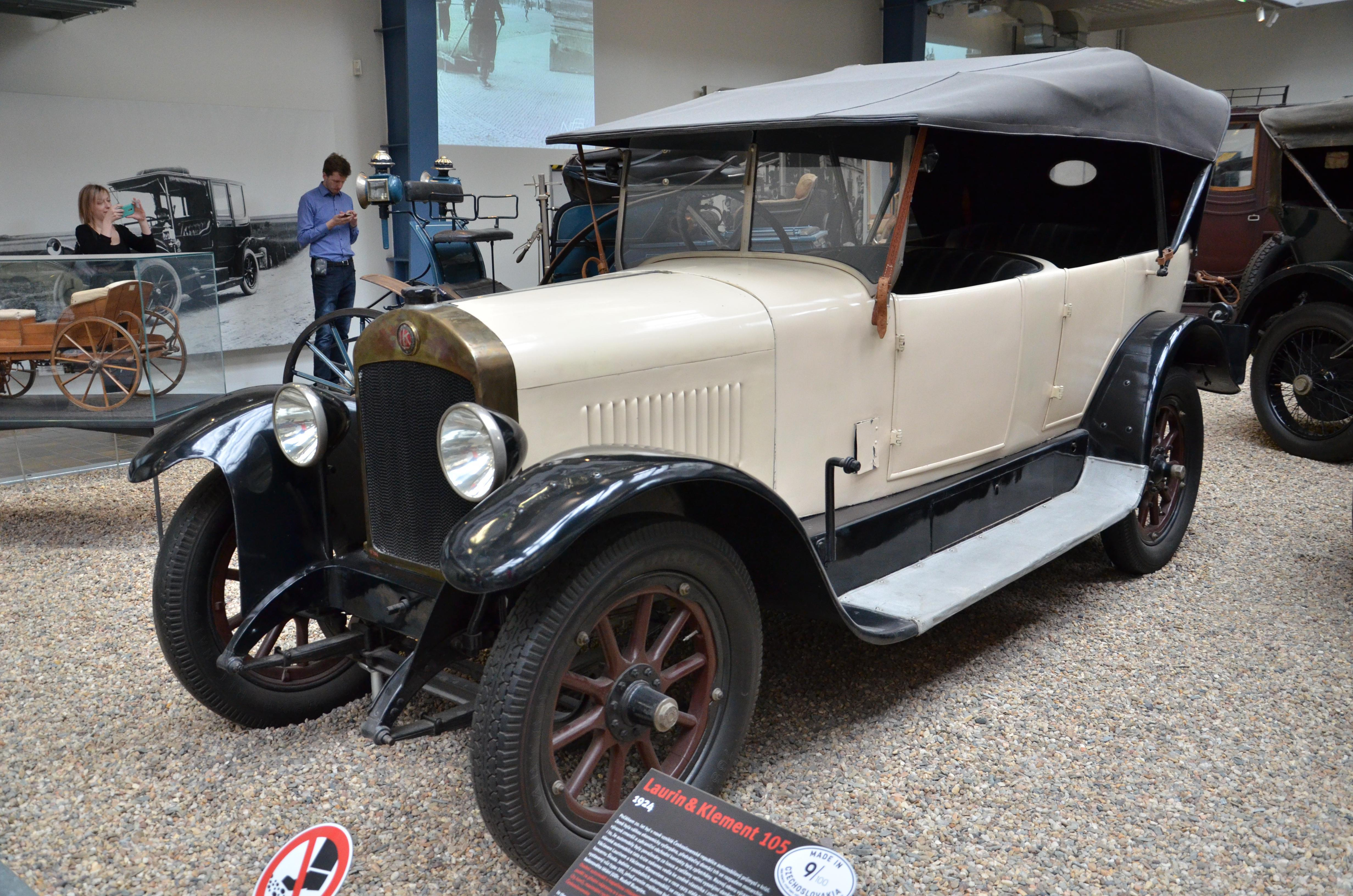
Laurin & Klement 105 (1924)

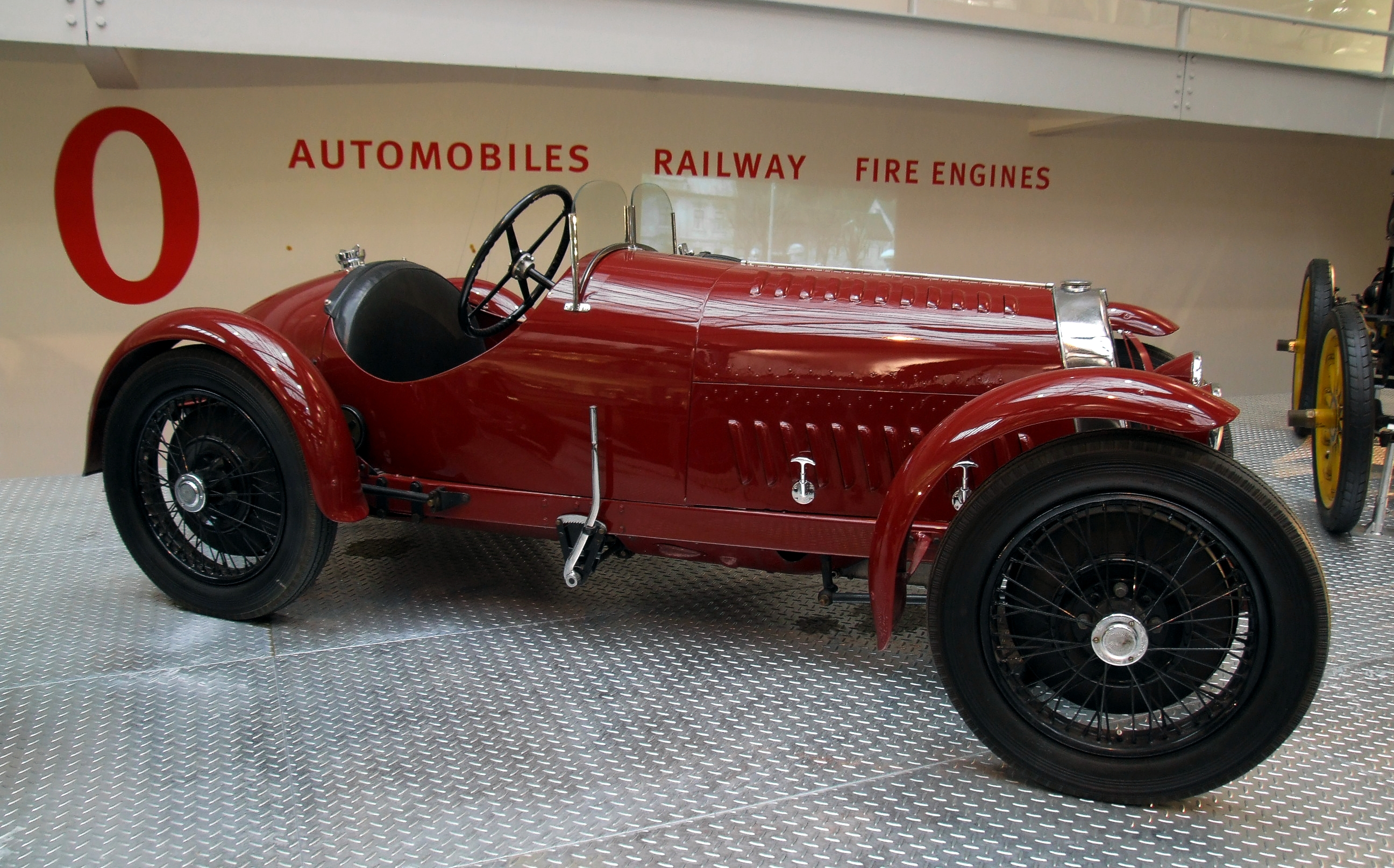
Wikov 7/28 (1929)

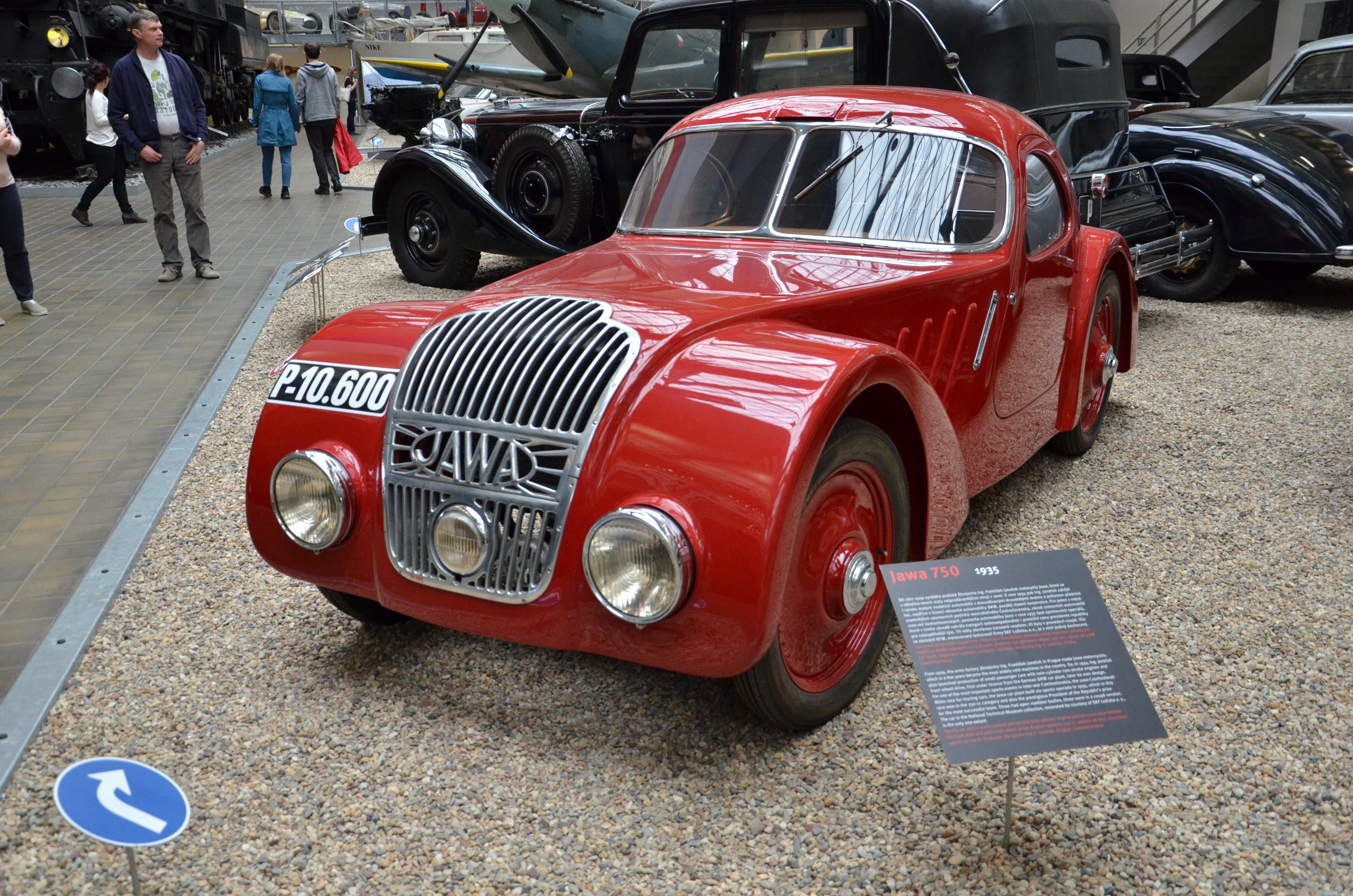
Jawa 750 (1935)

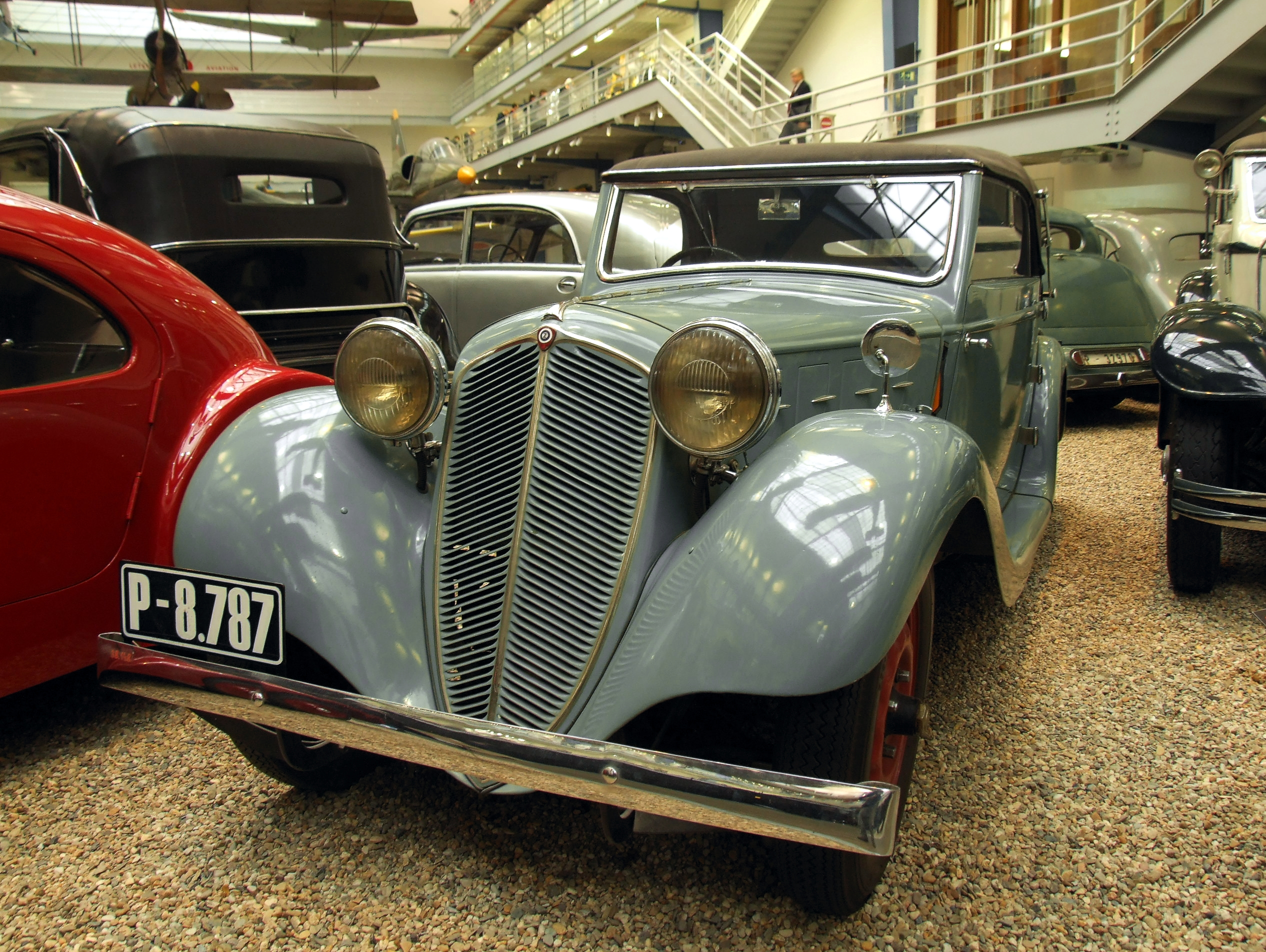
Z-4 (1936)

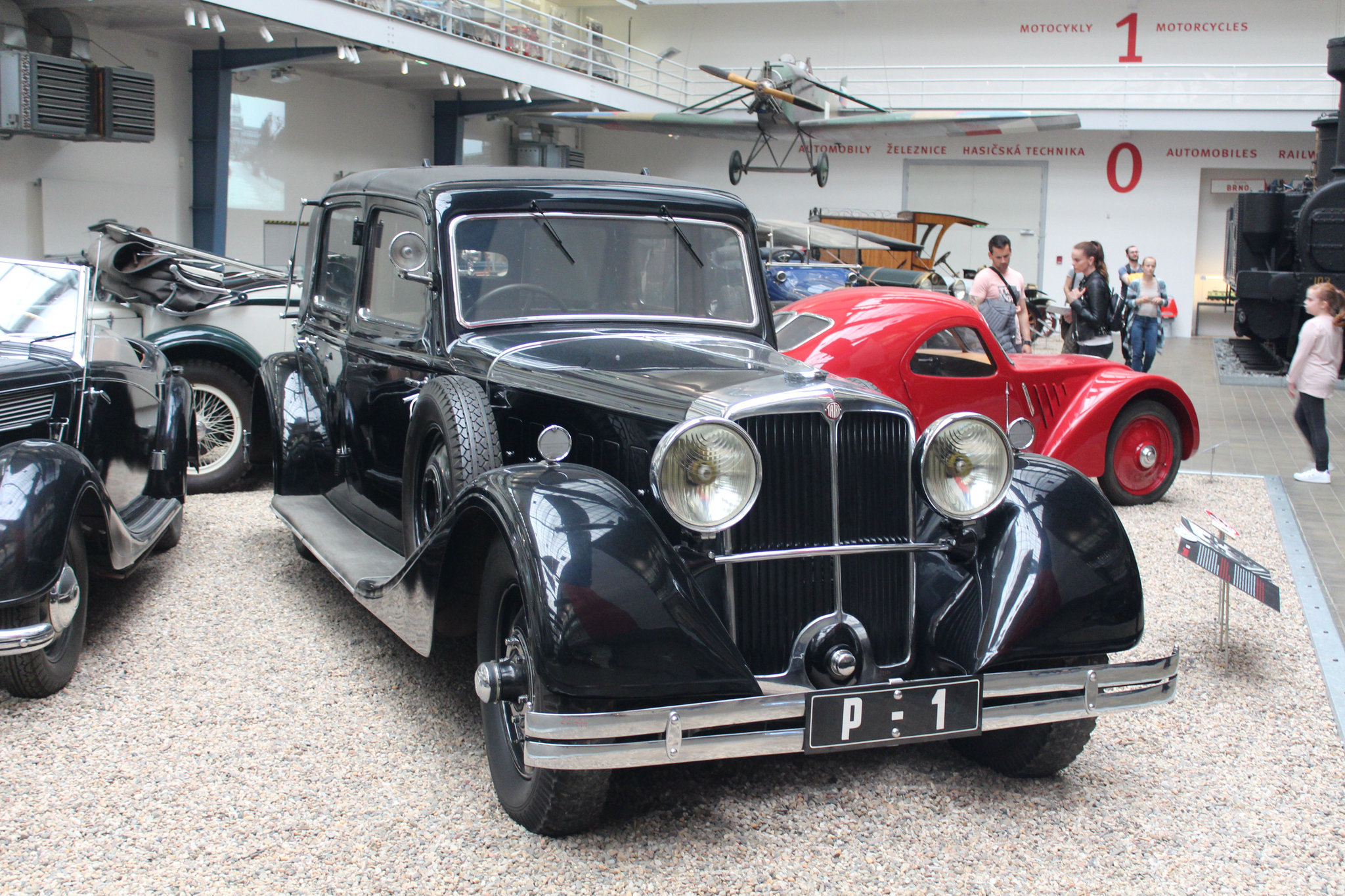
Tatra 80 (1935) of President T. G. Masaryk

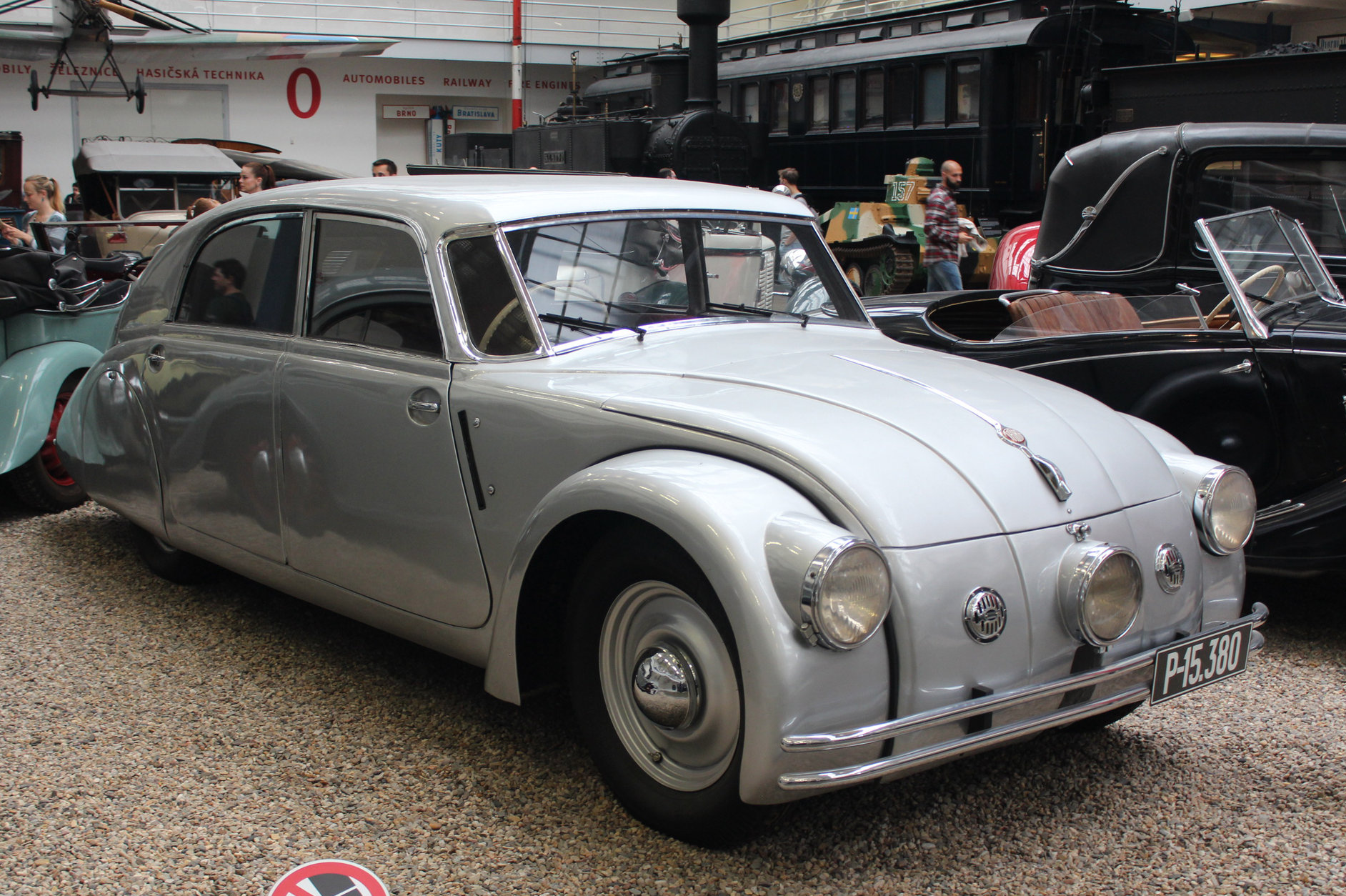
Tatra 77 (1937)

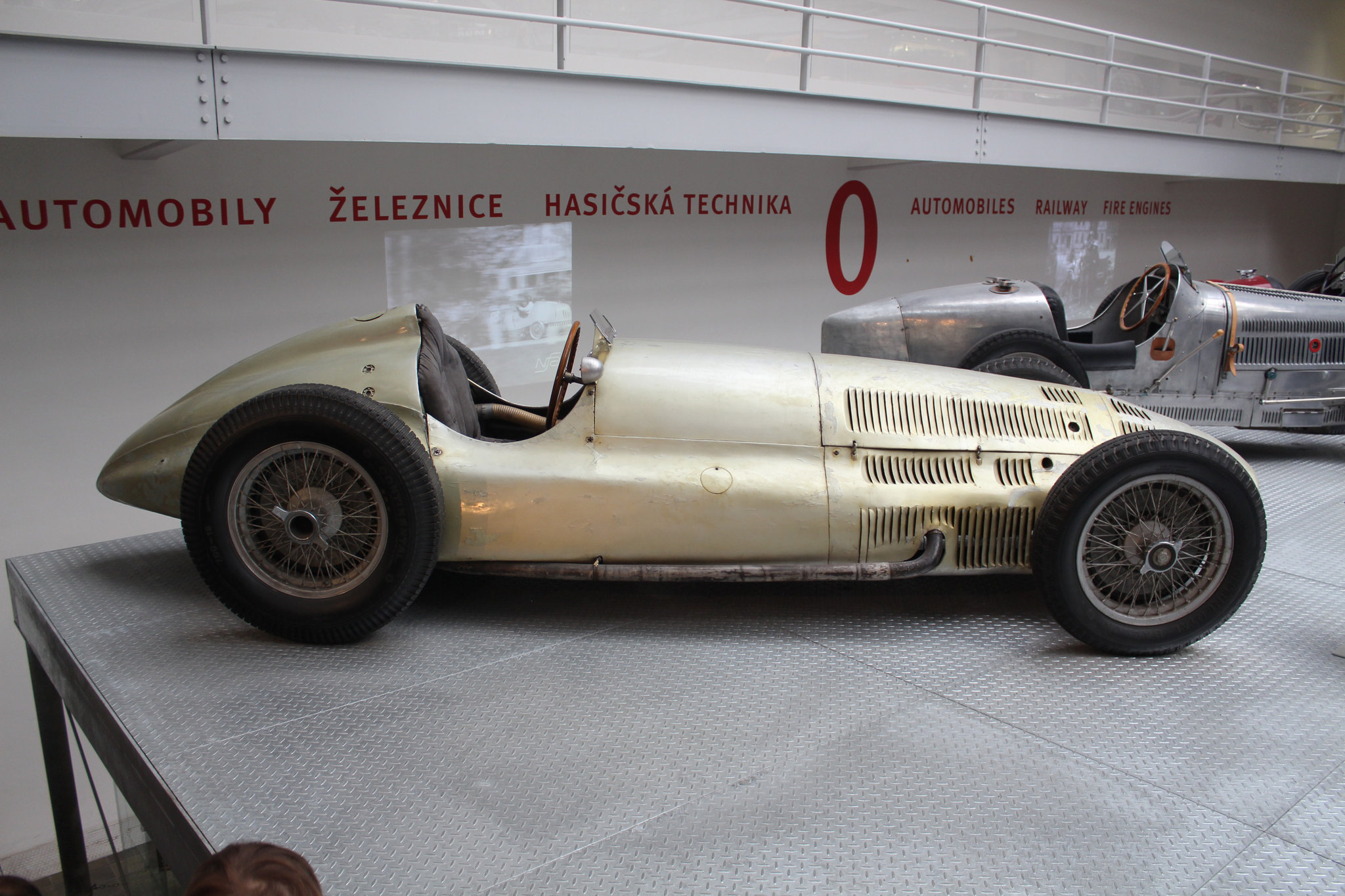
Mercedes Benz W154 (1938-1939), car of Rudolf Caracciola, speed 315 km/h

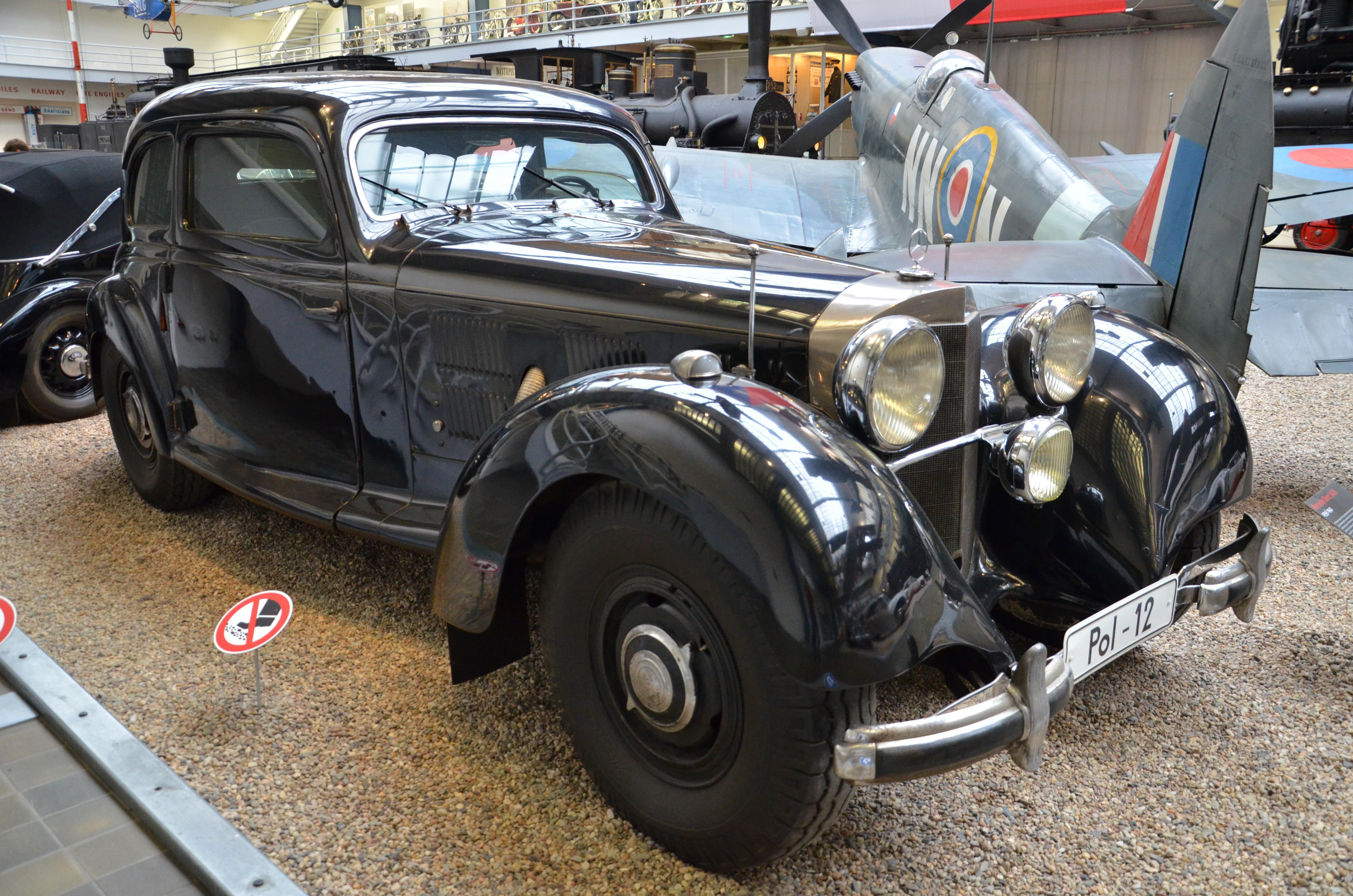
Mercedes-Benz 540K (1939-1942), car of Karl Hermann Frank

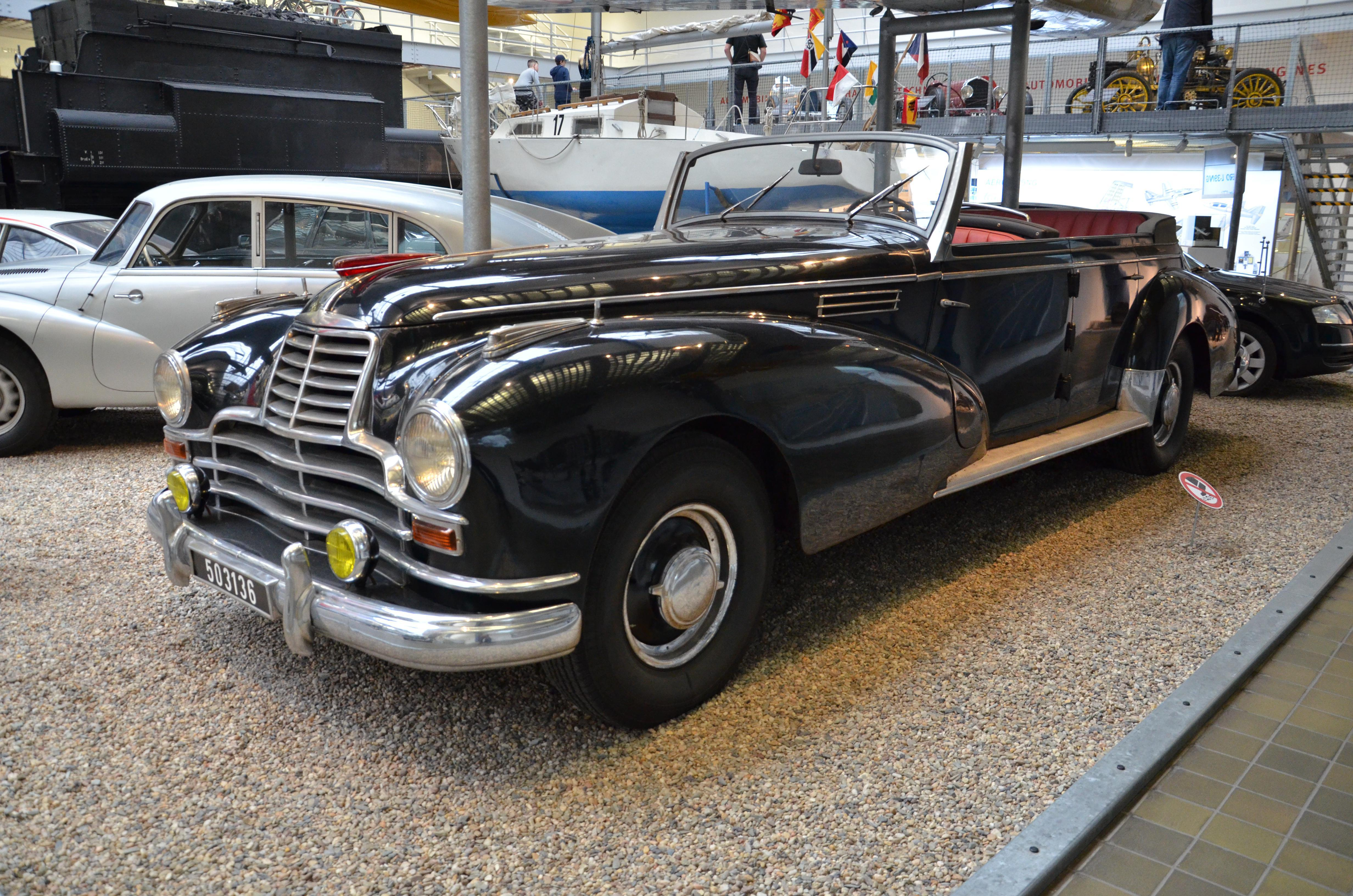
Mercedes-Benz 770 (1939-1952)

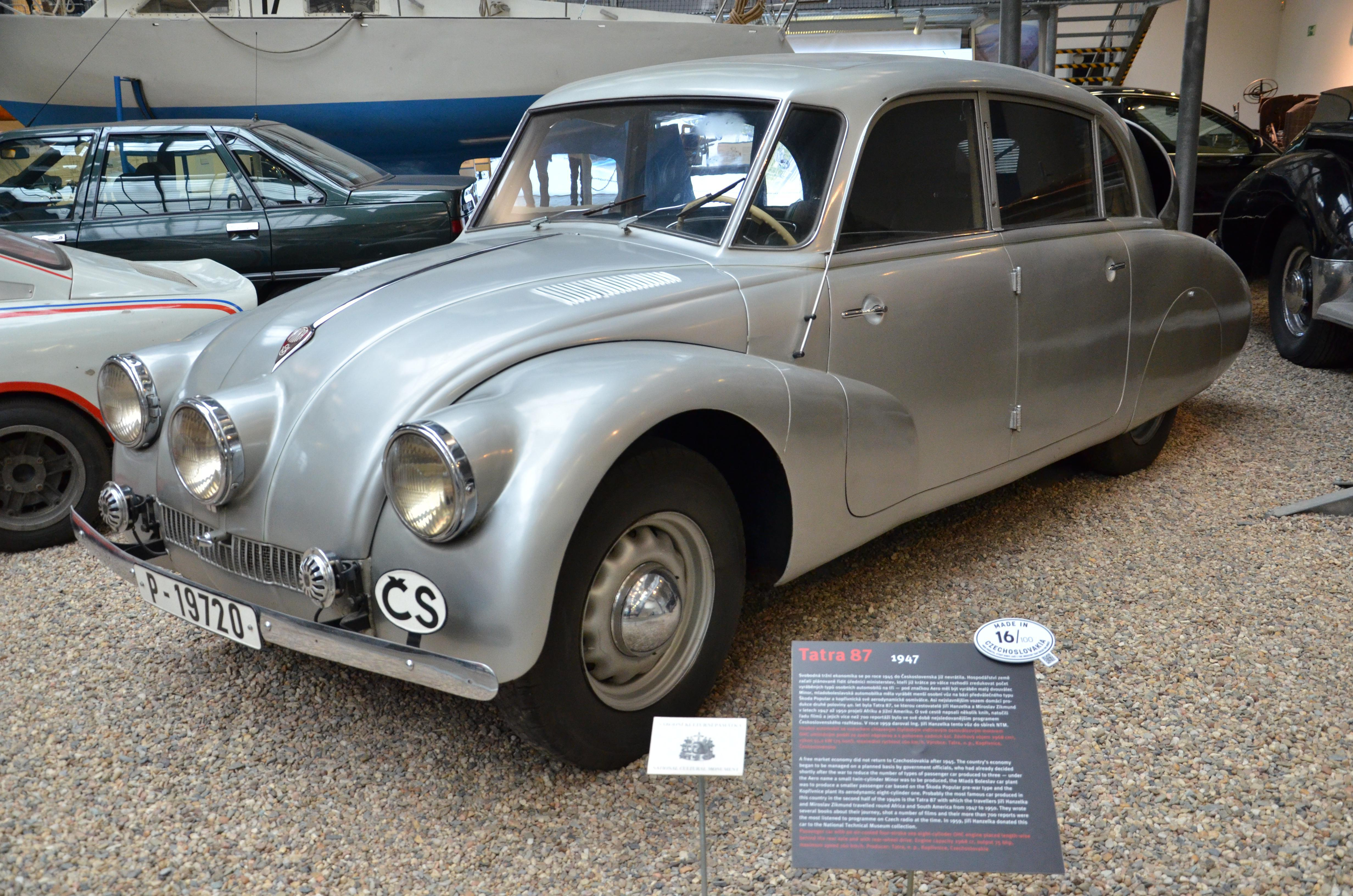
Tatra 87 (1947), car of travelers Hanzelka and Zikmund

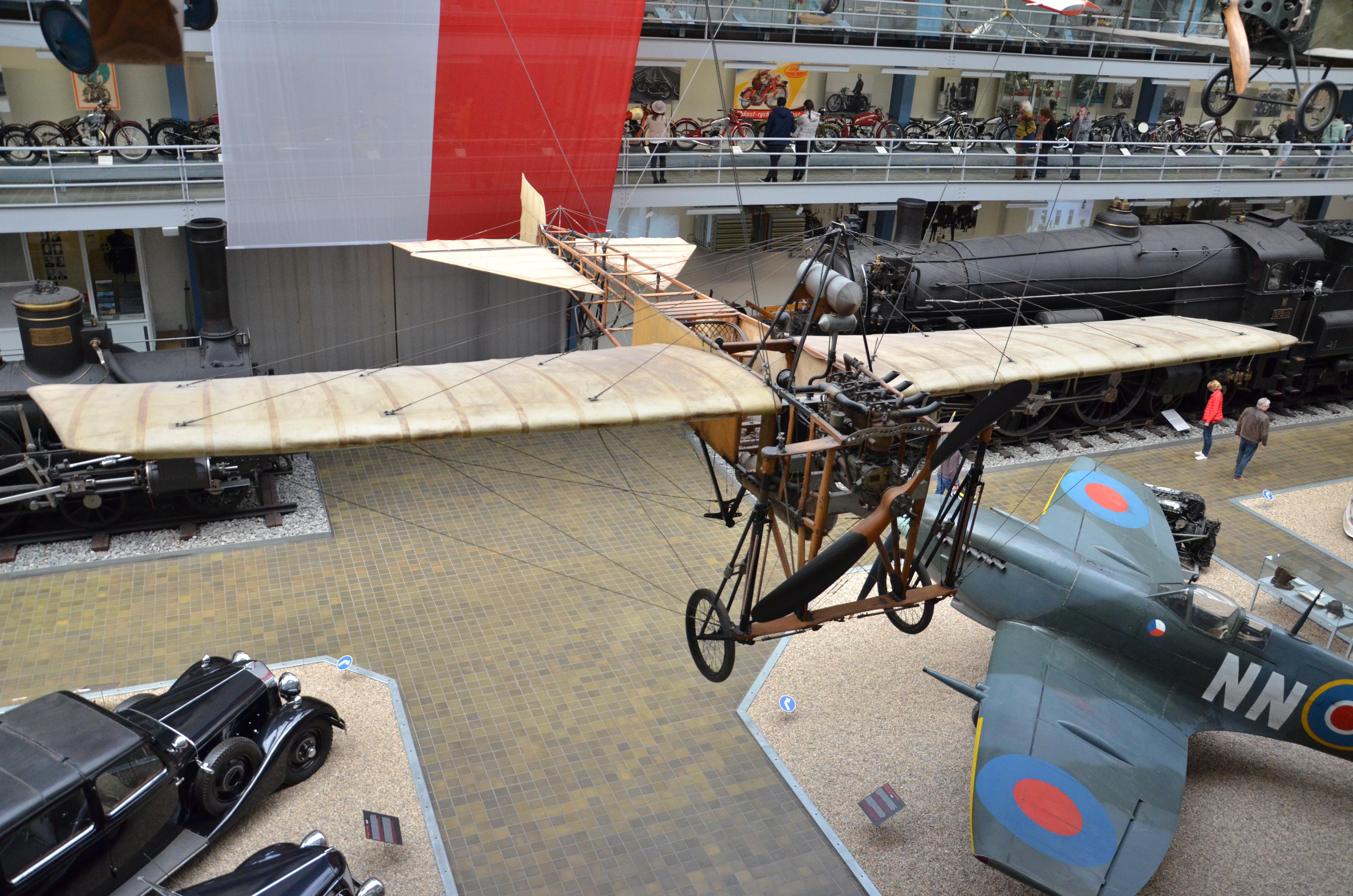
Kašpar JK-Blériot (1911), aircraft of the first Czech pilot Jan Kašpar

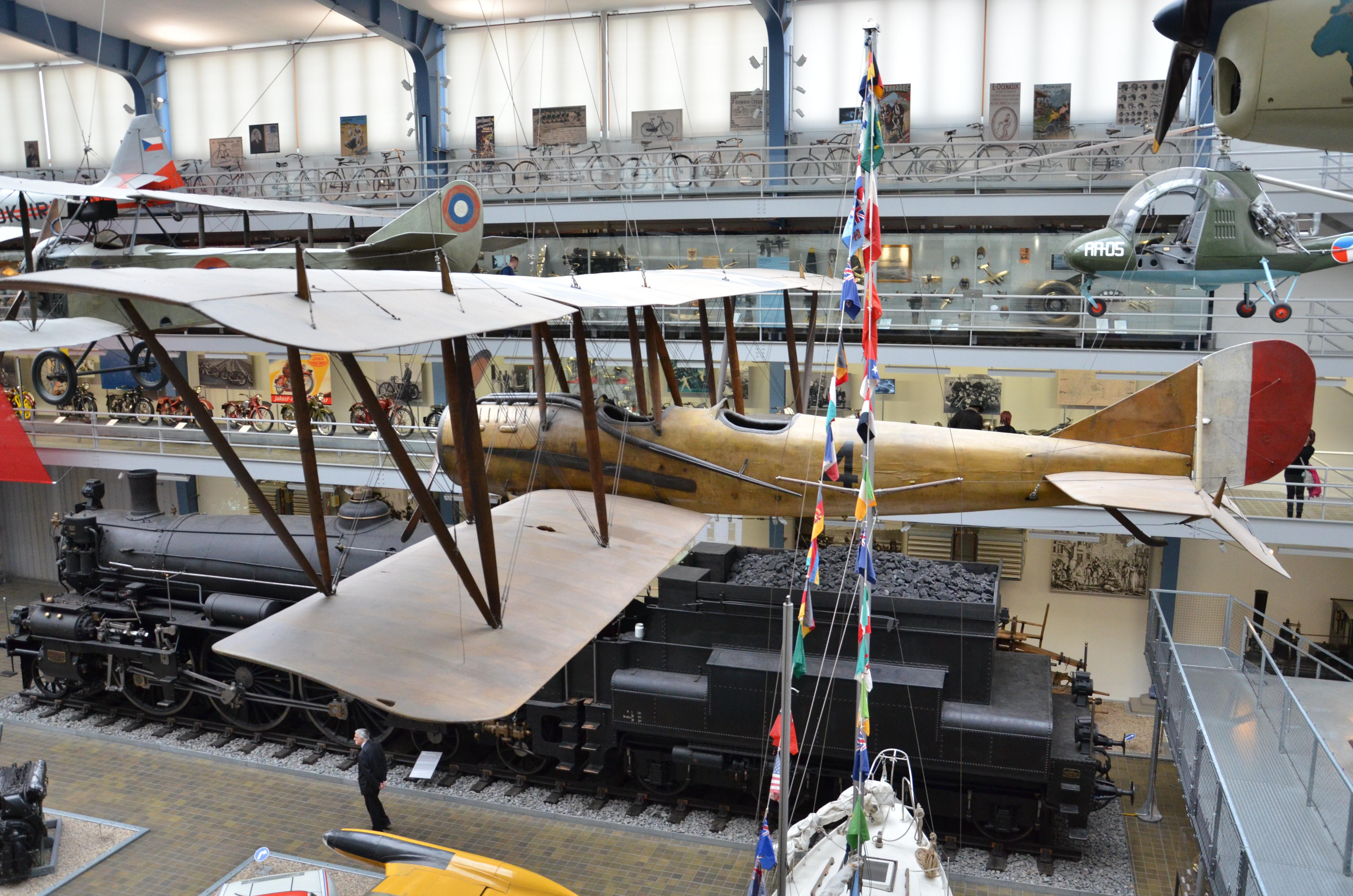
L. W. F. Model V Tractor (1917), American two-seat biplane, brought by Czechoslovak Legion from Russia

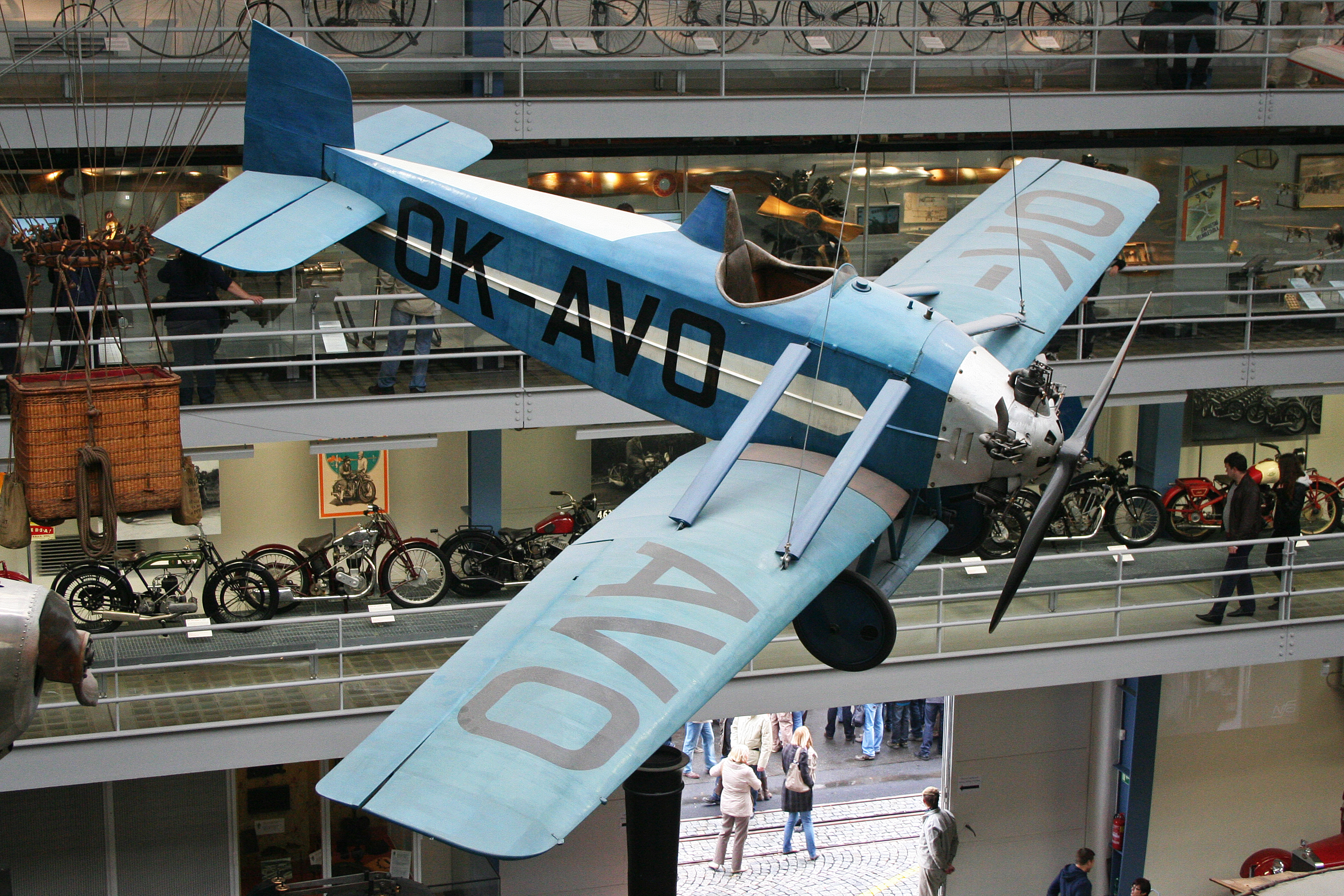
Avia BH-10 (1924)

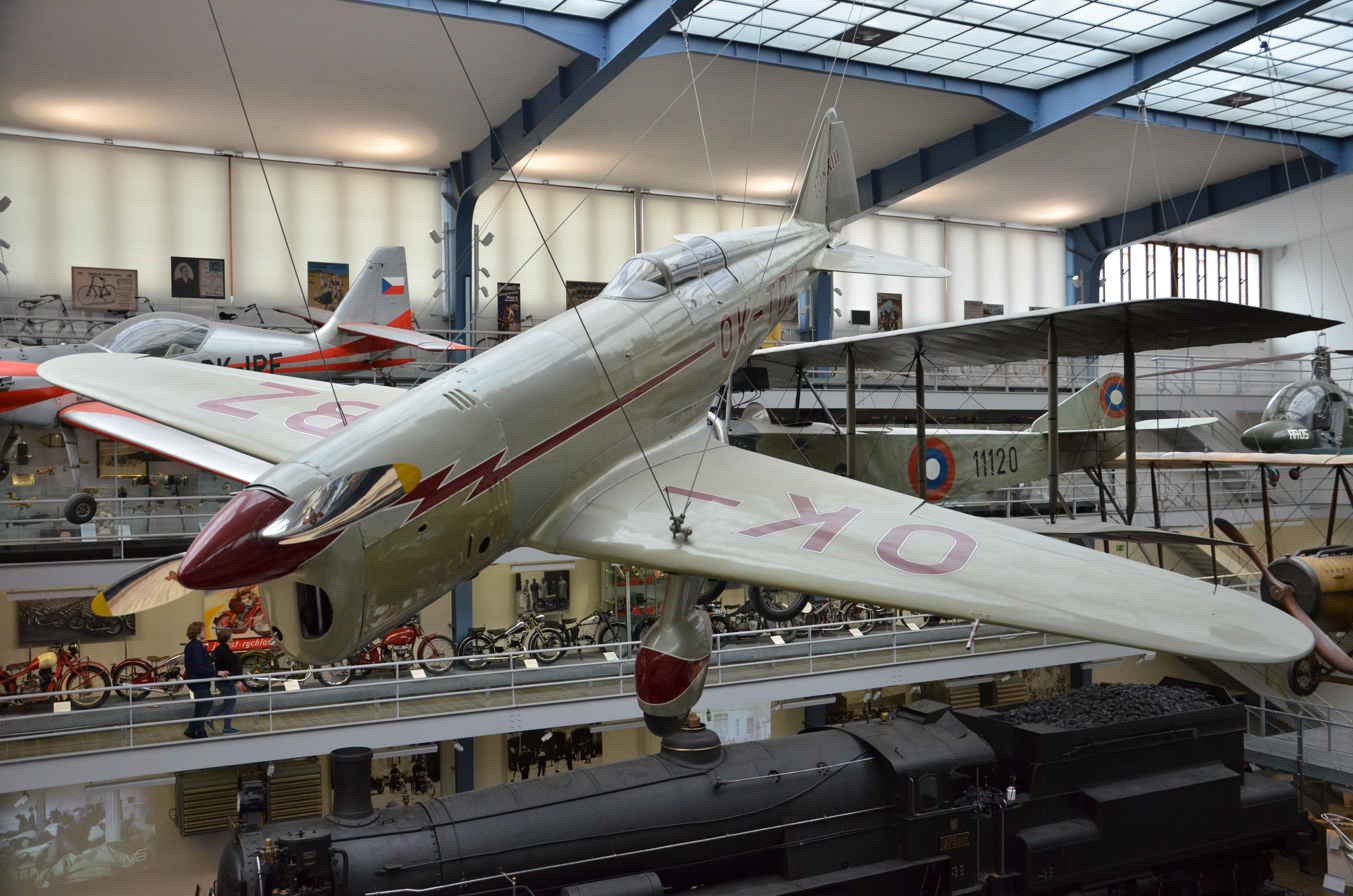
Zlín XIII (1937)

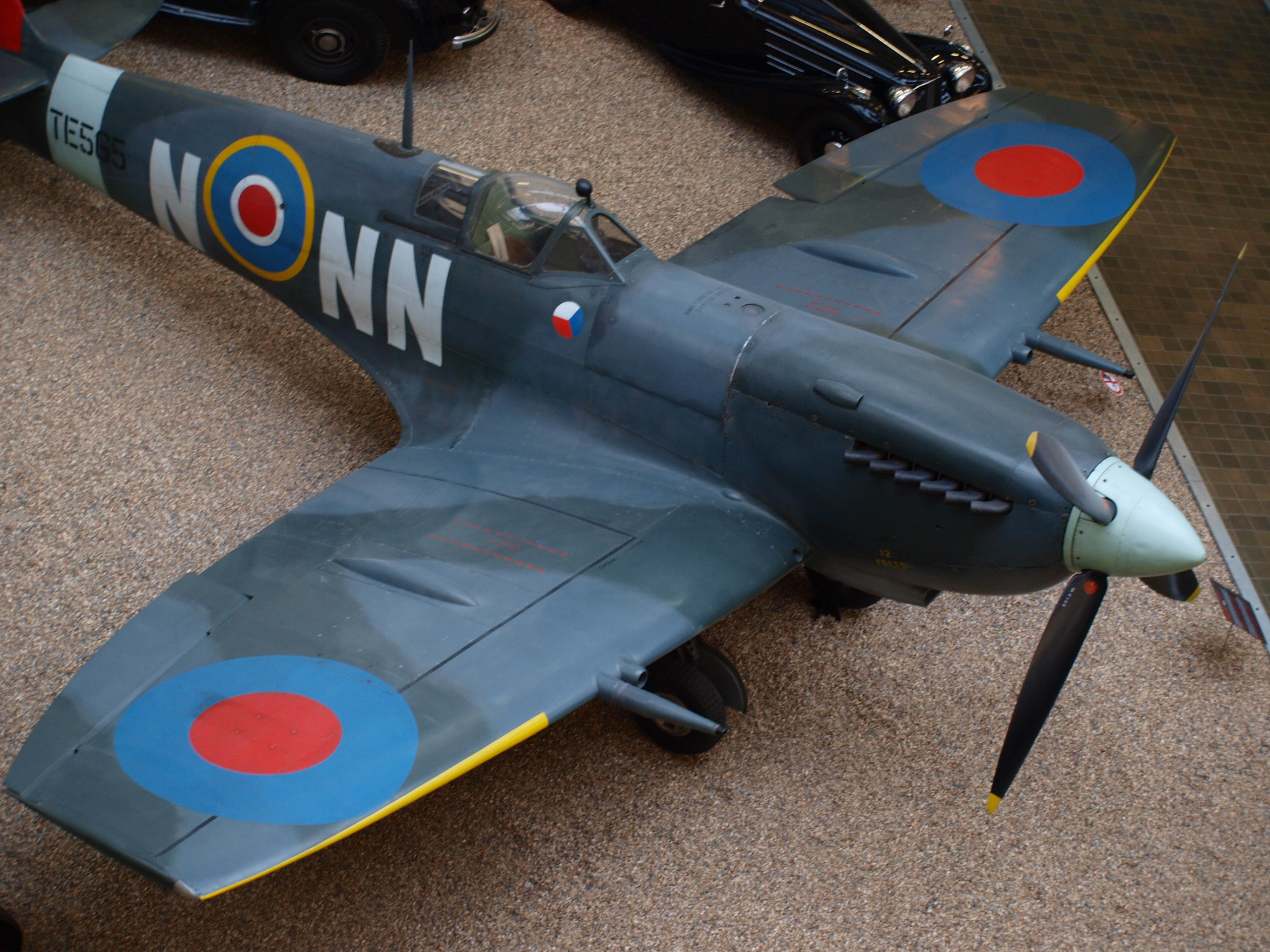
Supermarine Spitfire LF Mk.IXE (1945)

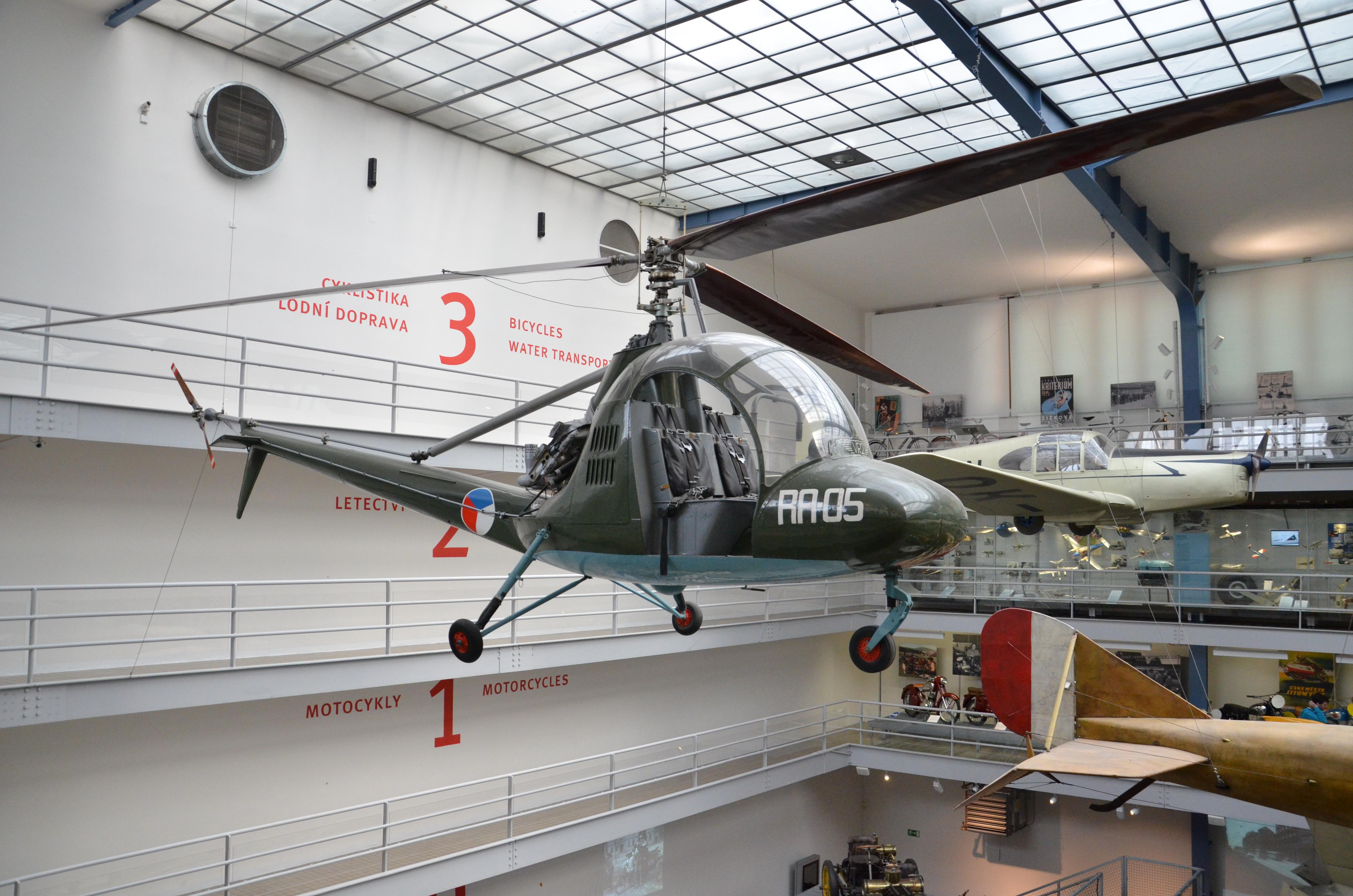
Aero HC-2 Heli Baby (1955)

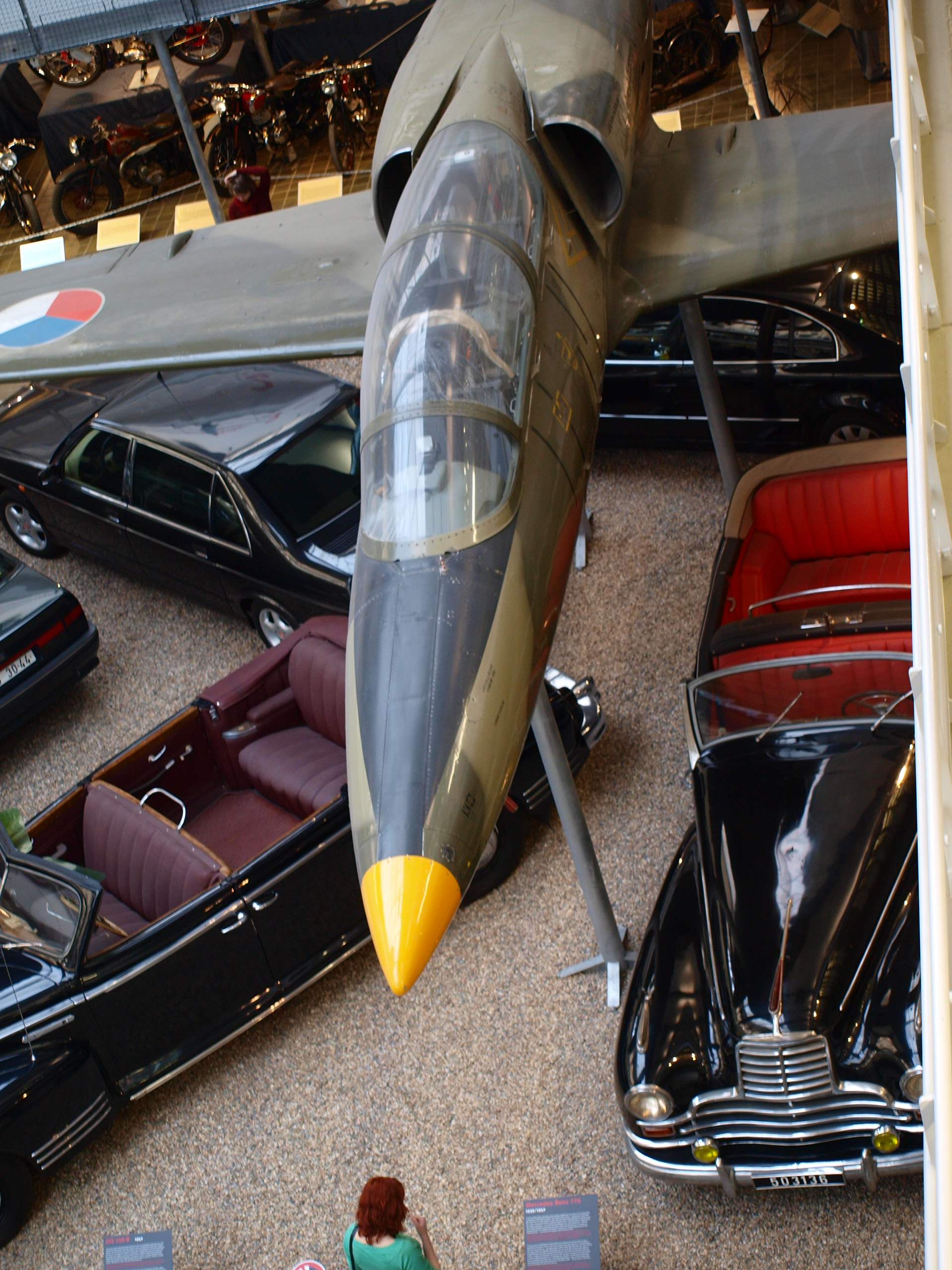
Aero L-39 Albatros (1978)

== See also ==
- Kbely Aviation Museum
- List of museums in Prague
