= Tatra 70 =

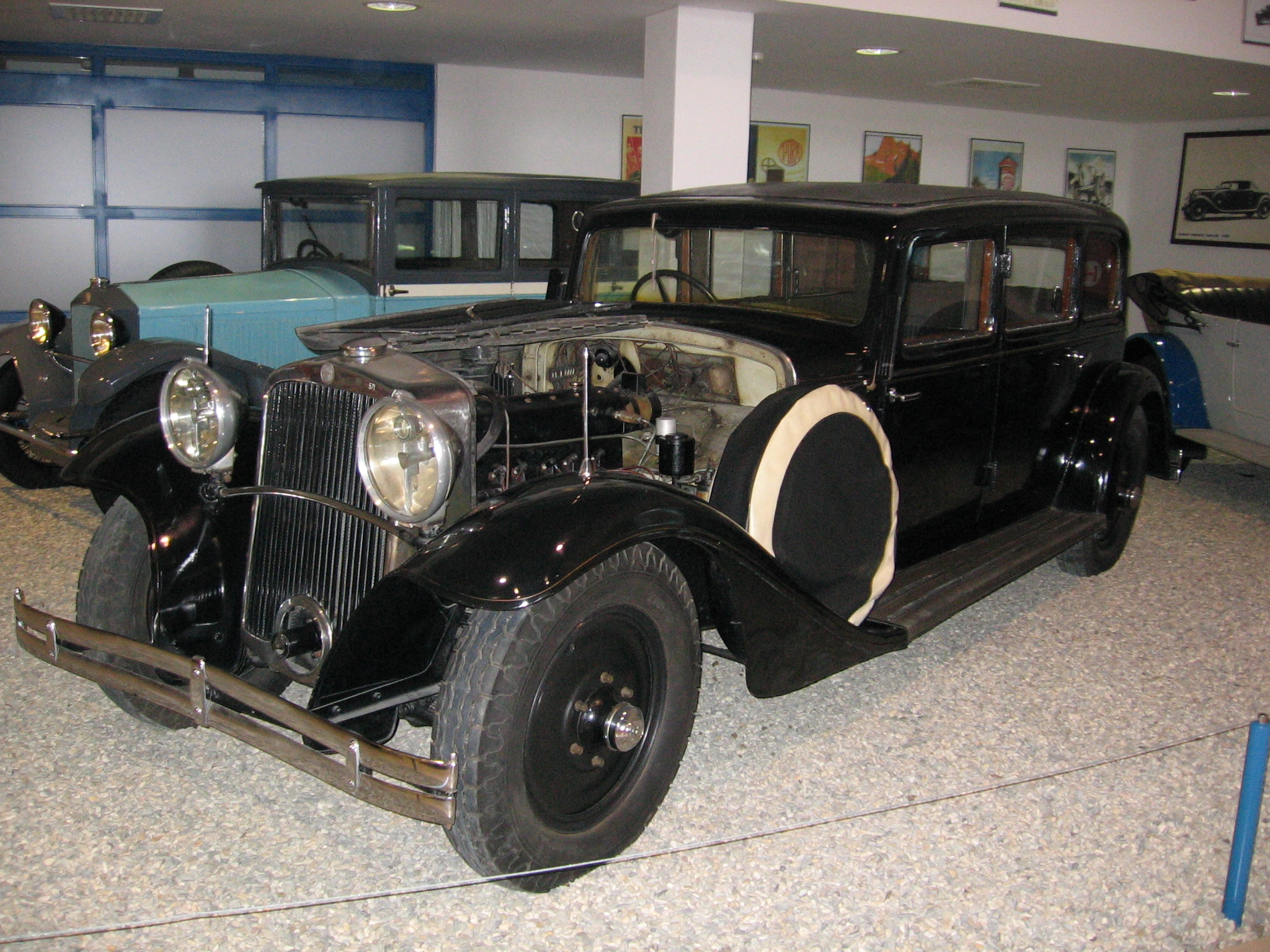

Overview
- Manufacturer: Tatra
- Production: 1931–32 (Tatra 70); 1934–37 (Tatra 70A)

Body and chassis
- Class: luxury full-size car
- Body style: sedan, convertible, limousine, coupé
- Layout: FR layout
- Chassis: backbone chassis

Powertrain
- Engine: Tatra 70: 3,406 cc I6; Tatra 70A: 3,845 cc I6
- Transmission: 4-speed manual

Dimensions
- Wheelbase: 3,800 mm (149.6 in)
- Length: 5,350 mm (210.6 in)
- Width: 1,800 mm (70.9 in)
- Height: 1,730 mm (68.1 in)
- Curb weight: 2,200–2,500 kg (4,850–5,512 lb)

Chronology
- Predecessor: Tatra 31
- Successor: Tatra 87

The Tatra 70 is a Czechoslovak luxury car that was made by Tatra at Kopřivnice from 1931 to 1937. It succeeded the Tatra 31.

== Tatra 70 ==
The model was launched in 1931, the same year as the Tatra 80, and the two models have the same backbone chassis and swing axle suspension. The front wheels have a rigid axle with overhead transverse leaf springs. The rear wheels are on a swing axle with half transverse leaf springs. The Type 70 has disc wheels, whereas the Type 80 has wire wheels.

But the underlying difference is the engine. The Type 80 was given a 5,990 cc, 65-degree V-12 sidevalve engine, but the Type 70 has a water-cooled six-cylinder OHC 3,406 cc engine that produces 65 hp (48 kW). The engine camshaft is driven by a bevel. Transmission is via a multi-plate dry clutch and four-speed gearbox to the rear wheels. The car weighs about 2,400 kg (5,300 lb) and its top speed is 110 km/h (68 mph).

The model was offered with a choice of bodies that included a four-seat sedan, two-door coupé, four-door convertible and six-seat limousine. A fire engine version was also built. Total production was 50 cars by 27 April 1932.

== Tatra 70A ==
In 1934 the Tatra 70A replaced the 70. Its engine and transmission were derived from the Type 70 but engine capacity was increased to 3,845 cc. This increased performance to 70 hp (52 kW) and top speed to 130 km/h (81 mph). The weight of the revised model is 2,450 kg (5,400 lb). Total production was 70 cars by 28 August 1936.

Production ceased in 1937. However, after the Second World War Tatra built one Tatra 70 from spare parts, which it supplied on 23 May 1947 to President Edvard Beneš.

== Sources ==
- Schmarbeck, Wolfgang (1977). Tatra, Die Geshichte Tatra Automobile (in German). Bad Oeynhausen: Verlag des Internationalen Auto und Motorrad-Museums. ASIN B015S8O2OS.
- Tuček, Jan (2017). Auta první republiky 1918–1938 (in Czech). Prague: Grada Publishing. pp. 159–160, 285–286. ISBN 978-80-271-0466-6.
