= Běchary =

- Municipality
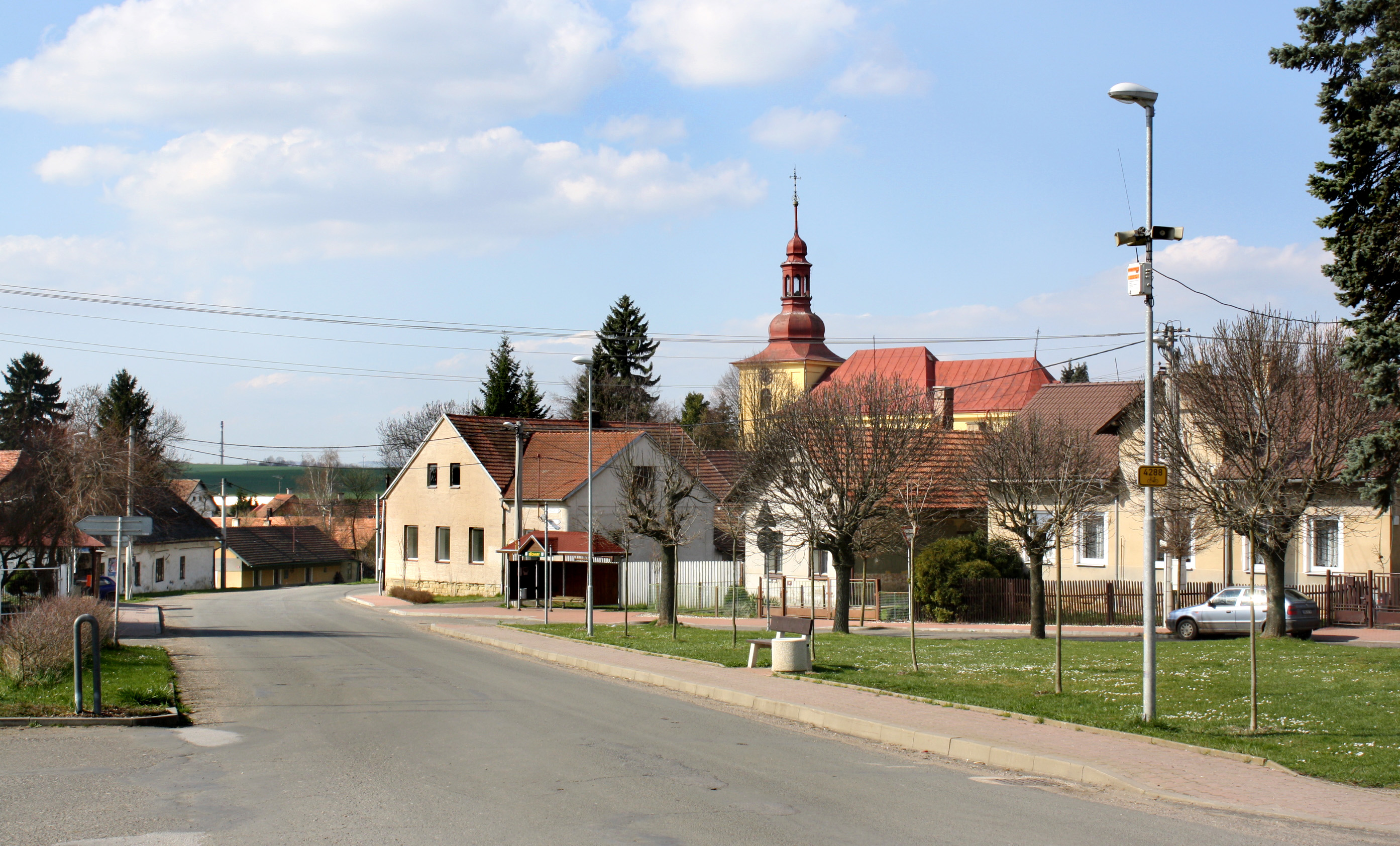
- Centre of Běchary

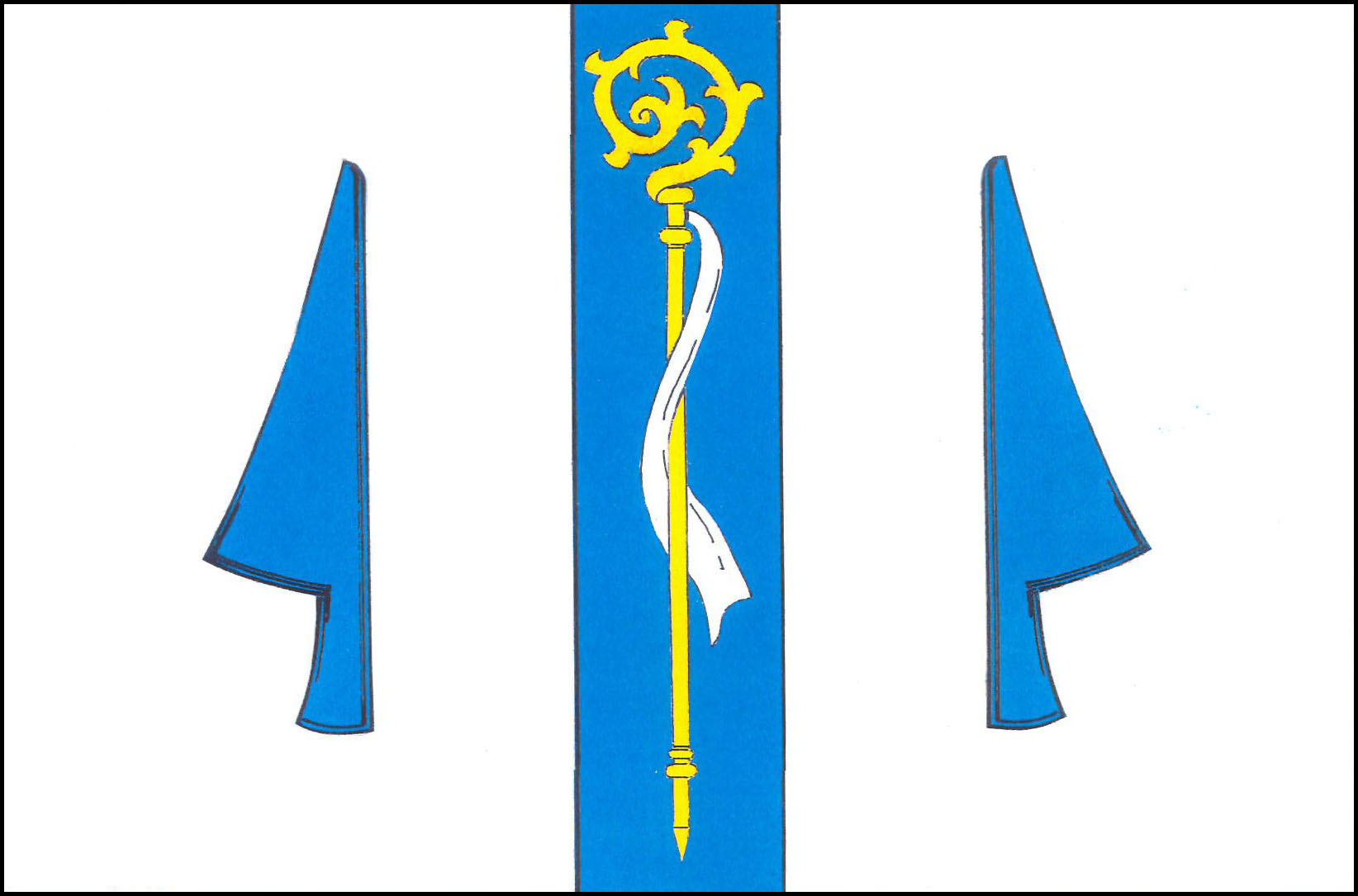
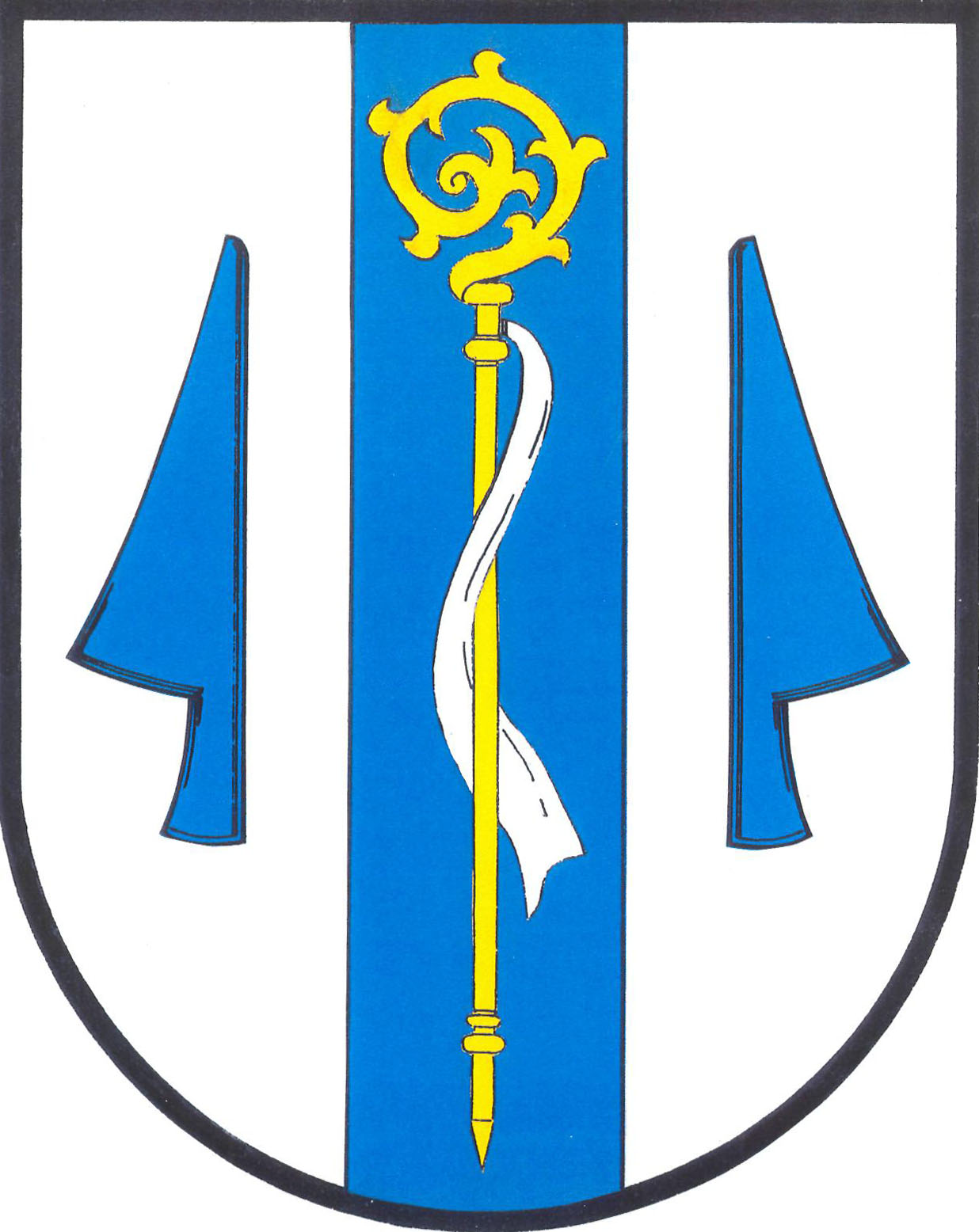
- Flag Coat of arms

- Location in the Czech Republic
- Coordinates: 50°18′51″N 15°17′33″E
- Country: Czech Republic
- Region: Hradec Králové
- District: Jičín
- First mentioned: 1290

Area
  - Total: 8.79 km^{2} (3.39 sq mi)
- Elevation: 230 m (750 ft)

Population (2026-01-01)
  - Total: 276
  - Density: 31.4/km^{2} (81.3/sq mi)
- Time zone: UTC+1 (CET)
  - Summer (DST): UTC+2 (CEST)
- Postal code: 507 32
- Website: www.bechary.cz

Běchary is a municipality and village in Jičín District in the Hradec Králové Region of the Czech Republic. It has about 300 inhabitants.

== Administrative division ==
Běchary consists of two municipal parts (in brackets population according to the 2021 census):

- Běchary (217)
- Běchárky (20)

== Etymology ==
The initial name of the village was Běchaři, meaning "the village of běchařs". Běchař was an Old Czech term for a certain type of craftsman. However, it is not known today what this word exactly meant.

== Geography ==
Běchary is located about 14 kilometres (9 mi) south of Jičín and 59 km (37 mi) northeast of Prague. It lies on the border between the Central Elbe Table and Jičín Uplands. The highest point is at 260 m (853 ft) above sea level.

== History ==
The first written mention of Běchary is from 1290. Before 1559, the village was part of the Kopidlno estate, and then it was joined to the Staré Hrady estate. From 1609 until the establishment of an independent municipality in 1848, it belonged again to the Kopidlno estate.

== Demographics ==
Historical population

Year	Pop.	±%
1869	622	—
1880	721	+15.9%
1890	720	−0.1%
1900	699	−2.9%
1910	692	−1.0%

Year	Pop.	±%
1921	675	−2.5%
1930	661	−2.1%
1950	455	−31.2%
1961	368	−19.1%
1970	299	−18.8%

Year	Pop.	±%
1980	264	−11.7%
1991	224	−15.2%
2001	239	+6.7%
2011	219	−8.4%
2021	237	+8.2%

Source: Censuses

== Transport ==
There are no railways or major roads passing through the municipality.

== Sights ==
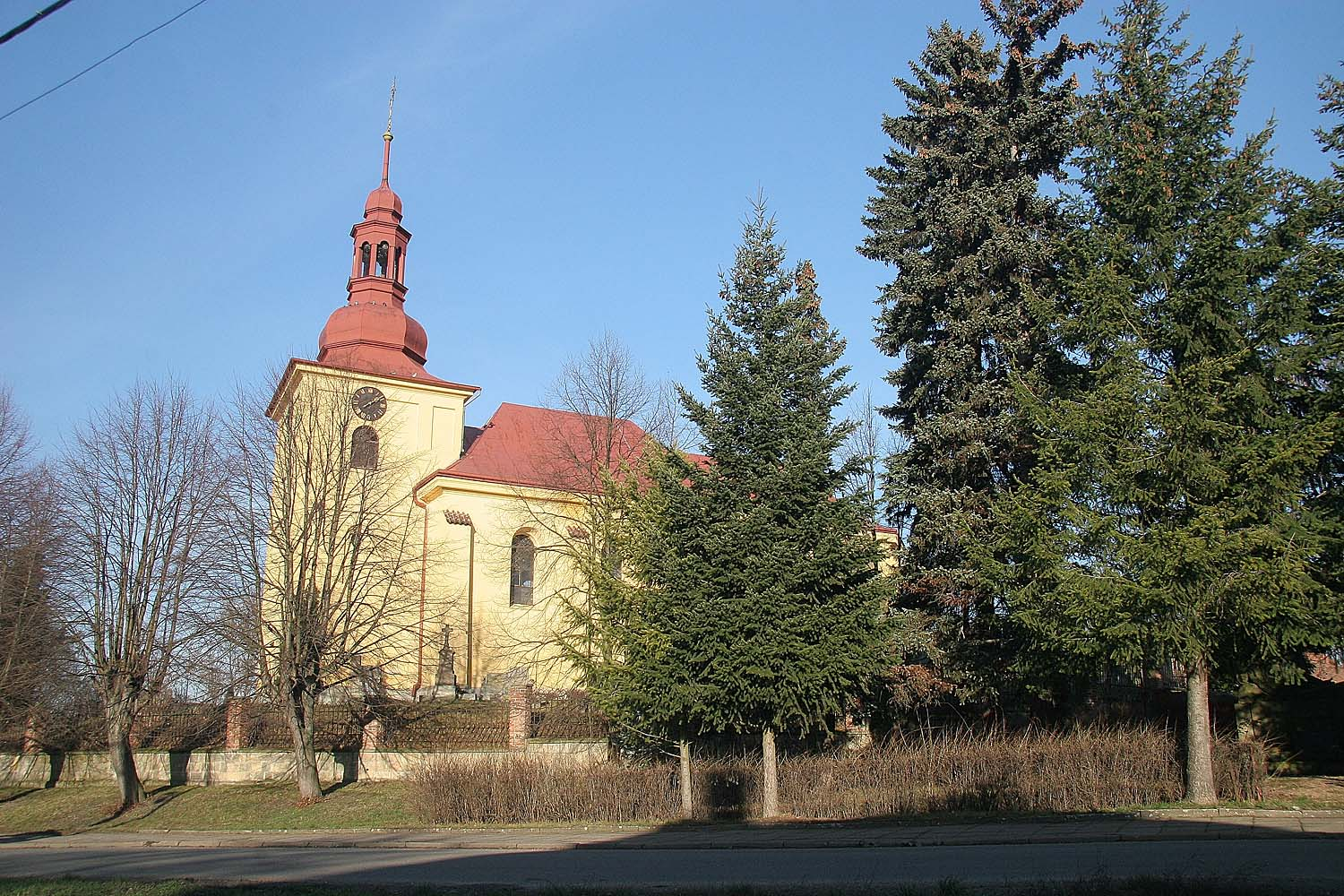
Church of Saint Adalbert

The main landmark of Běchary is the Church of Saint Adalbert. It is a Gothic church with significant Baroque modifications.
