= Jan Hladík =

Jan Hladík may refer to:

- Jan Hladík (artist), Czech artist
- Jan Hladík (footballer), Czech footballer
