= Jenny Hladíková =

Czech printmaker and artist (1930–2022)

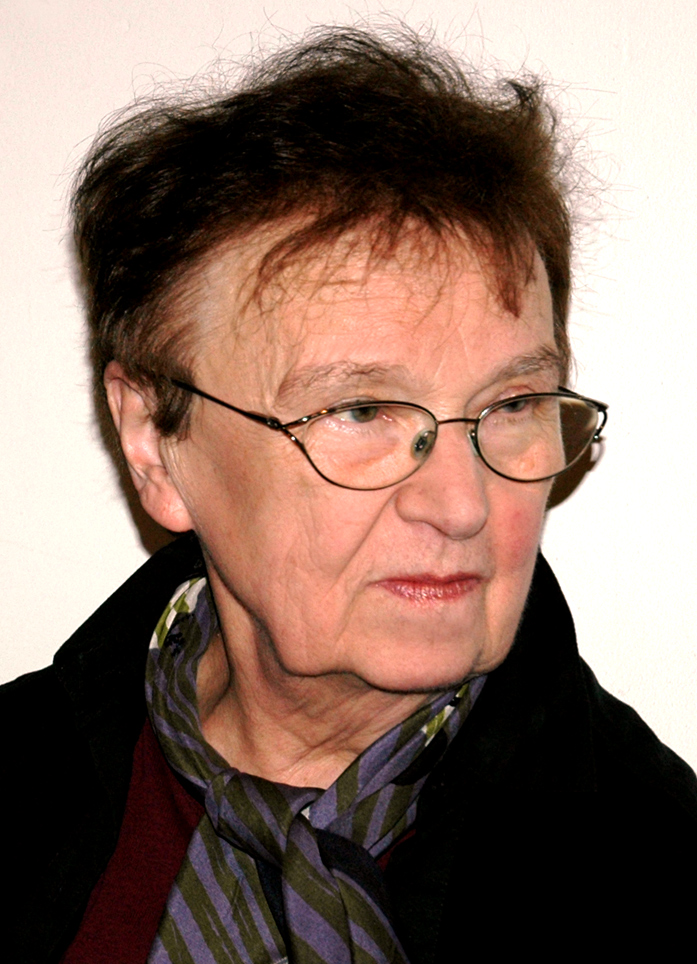
- Jenny Hladíková (2012)
- Born: Jenny Hršelová; 9 June 1930; Prague, Czechoslovakia
- Died: 25 July 2022 (aged 92); Prague, Czech Republic
- Education: Academy of Arts, Architecture and Design in Prague
- Occupations: textile artist, printmaker, painter
- Notable work: "Gesture of Green" (tapestry)
- Spouse: Jan Hladík
- Awards: Prix de Mecénes, Vevey 1977

Jenny Hladíková (née Hršelová; 9 June 1930 – 25 July 2022) was a Czech printmaker, painter and maker of tapestries.

== Life ==
Jenny Hršelová was born on 9 June 1930 in Kolín. In 1941–1948, she attended the Real Gymnasium in Kolín (professor of drawing Bohuslav Kutil). After moving to Prague, she graduated from the Jan Masaryk Real Gymnasium in Prague in 1949.

In 1949–1954, she studied at the Academy of Arts, Architecture and Design in Prague in the studio of monumental painting and textiles of Alois Fišárek. In 1955, she married her classmate, the artist Jan Hladík.

In the late 1950s, the Hladík couple acquired a printing press and Jenny Hladíková began to create her own graphic matrices, which Jan Hladík then printed. The couple built a joint studio in Prague-Podolí, where Jan Hladík constructed originally designed vertical looms for weaving tapestries. Jenny was first an expert advisor and later a collaborator on the large-scale work Blue Garden (190 × 430 cm, Parkhotel (Mama Shelter) Prague).

Jenny Hladíková exhibited her first tapestry in 1966 at a show of Czechoslovak tapestry in Prague Castle Riding Hall on the occasion of a meeting of the AICA International Congress of Critics, and one of her other tapestries was selected the following year for the 3rd International Biennale of Tapestry in Lausanne, where she exhibited again in 1969. Her first solo exhibition was in 1969 at Gallery on Charles Square, which was run by Ludmila Vachtová. The importance of Czechoslovak authors' textile artworks ought to be reflected in the forthcoming International Colloquium on Contemporary Tapestry, with the promised participation of about 50 artists and theoreticians from 11 countries, scheduled to take place in Prague in August 1968. However, due to the occupation of Czechoslovakia by the Warsaw Pact troops, it was no longer possible.

Since 1993, she has been a member of the art department of the Umělecká beseda. In 1999 she had a large retrospective exhibition of tapestries and prints in the Gallery of the Mánes Union of Fine Arts.

Jenny Hladíková lived and worked in Prague, where she also died on 25 July 2022.

=== Awards ===
In 1977, Jenny Hladíková received the Prix de Mecénes for her tapestry Gesture of Green at the international exhibition La Vigne, le Vin, le Sacré in Vevey. In 1979, she became a founding member of the Association Pierre Pauli in Lausanne.

== Work ==
=== Graphic art and painting ===
In the early 1960s, Jenny Hladíková dedicated herself to multi-coloured linocut (Park, 1963) and created a series of colour monotypes. She composed the print matrices from cut and dyed pieces of waxed paper and fabric assembled as abstract compositions on a ground covered with a base colour. She accomplishes the artistic effect by combining and layering irregular shapes and muted colour tones with the occasional bold colour accent. The individual sheets are not named and the interpretation of the work is left to the viewer (Untitled, 1963–65). The monotypes were the basis for the first tapestries (Four Stories, 1967). In parallel, she created numerous studies of structures in the form of drypoint or etching.

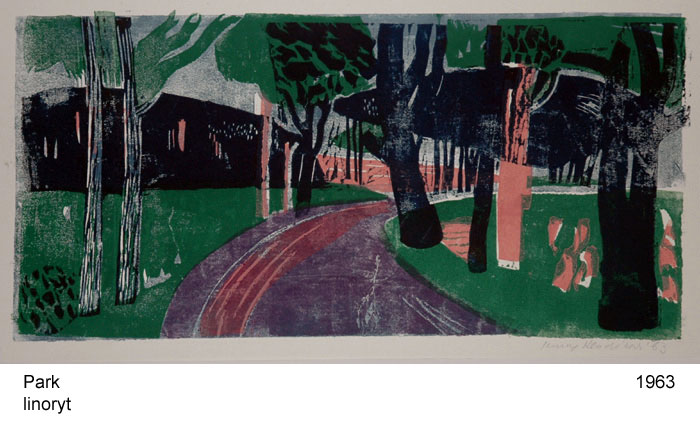
Park (multi-coloured linocut), 1963

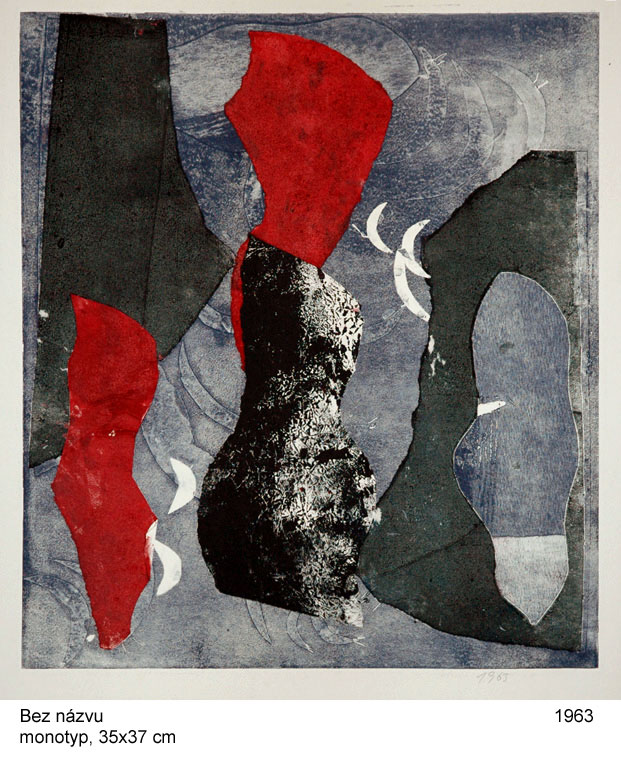
Untitled (monotype) 35 × 37 cm, 1963

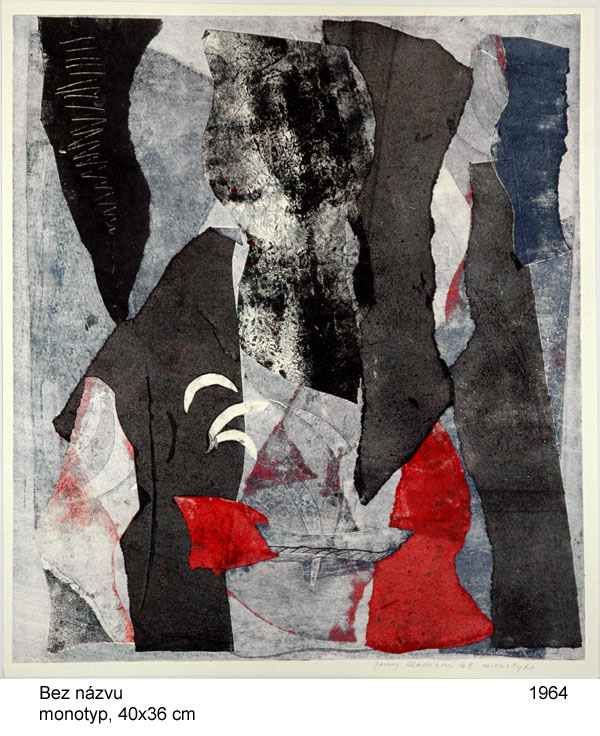
Untitled (monotype) 40 × 36 cm, 1964

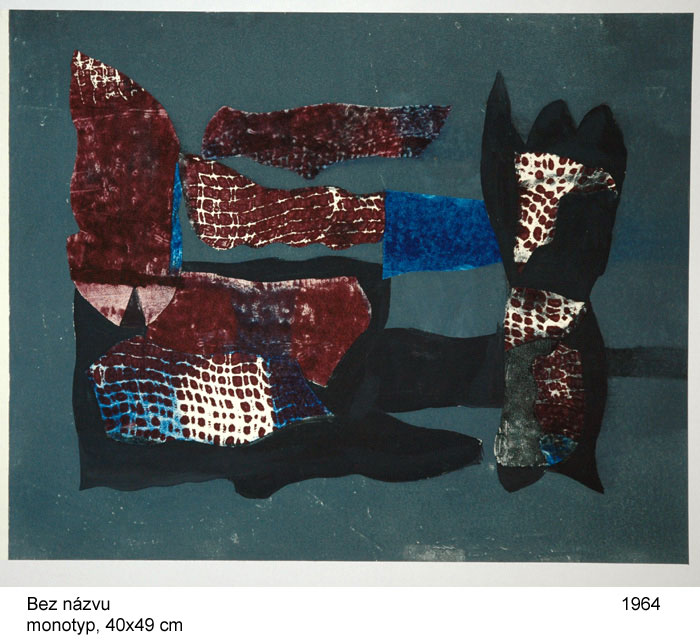
Untitled (monotype) 40 × 49 cm, 1964

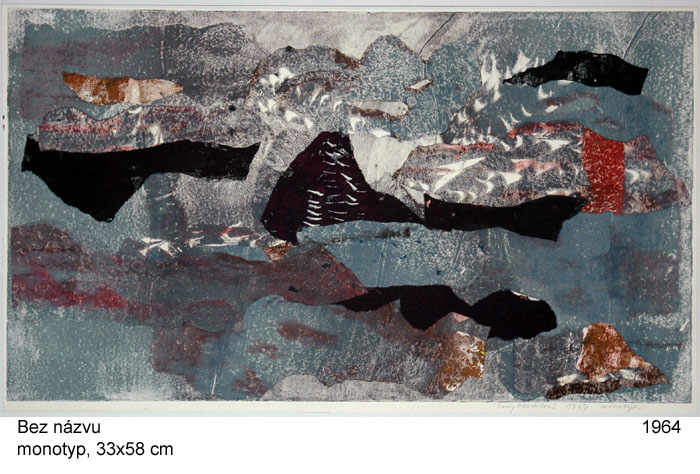
Untitled (monotype) 33 × 58 cm, 1964

In the second half of the 1960s, a series of black and white abstract structural prints were made from scraps of fabric, paper and scraps of cotton cordonnet. The arrangement of the individual components sometimes produces a linear drawing (Cords, 1966), but usually follows no predetermined order and works with an element of chance. The direction of the lines in soft curves and their local thickening gives the impression of movement (Growth, 1967, Flow, 1968), while at other times the artist uses the rough structure of the fabric as an irregular grid, representing living tissue (Meeting of Tissues, 1967, Two Tissues, 1972). In the titles of other abstract compositions she refers to natural phenomena (Dark Passage, 1966, Horizontal Layer, 1980) and living organisms (Vegetation, 1968, Vegetative Gesture, 1975), only rarely naming a concrete symbol (Cross, 1966, Big T, 1968, Angels, 1970). Individual small-format prints created in this way became the basis for tapestries (Tissue, structural print, 1967, tapestry, 1968).

In addition to printmaking, after 2000 the artist has also worked in watercolour and in the combination of watercolour and drawing. The subject of these works are natural structures and abstract landscapes.

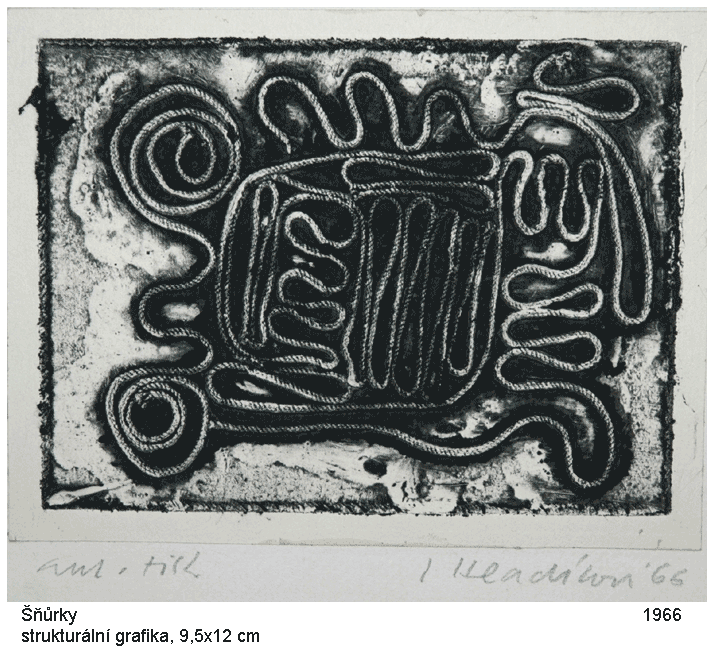
Cords (structural print), 9,5 × 12 cm, 1966

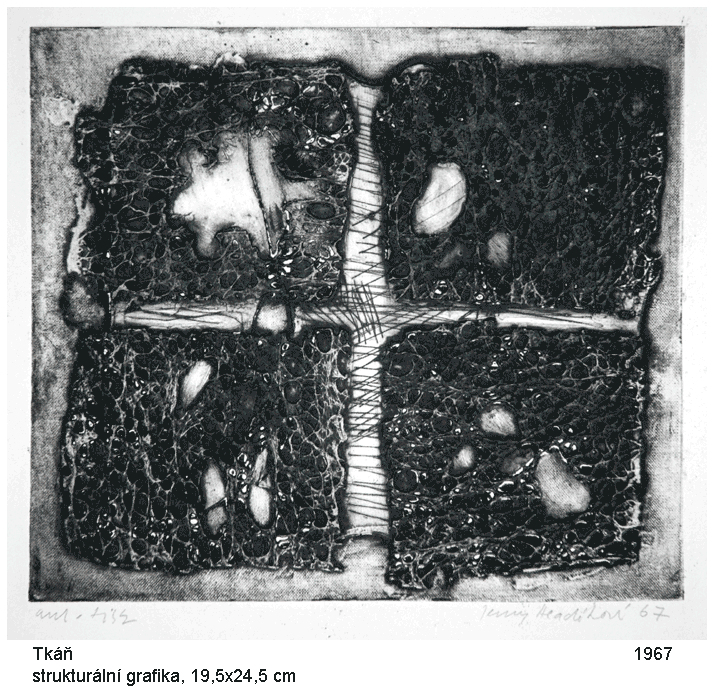
Tissue (structural print), 19,5 × 24,5 cm, 1967

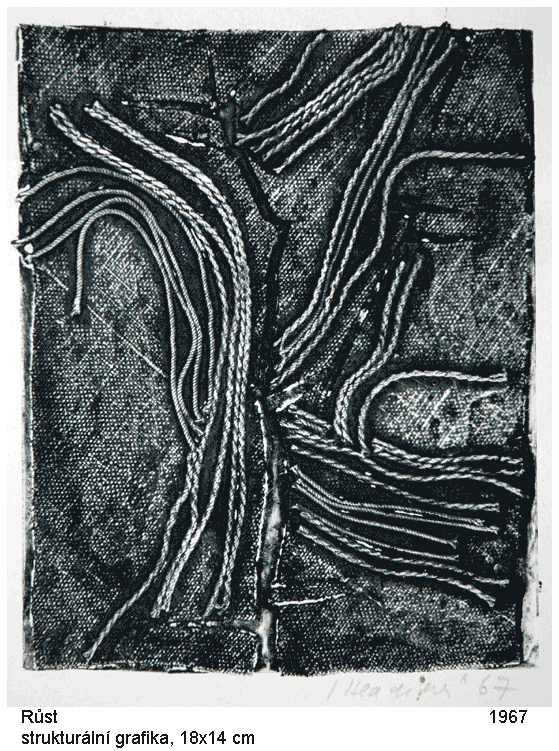
Growth (structural print), 18 x 14 cm, 1967

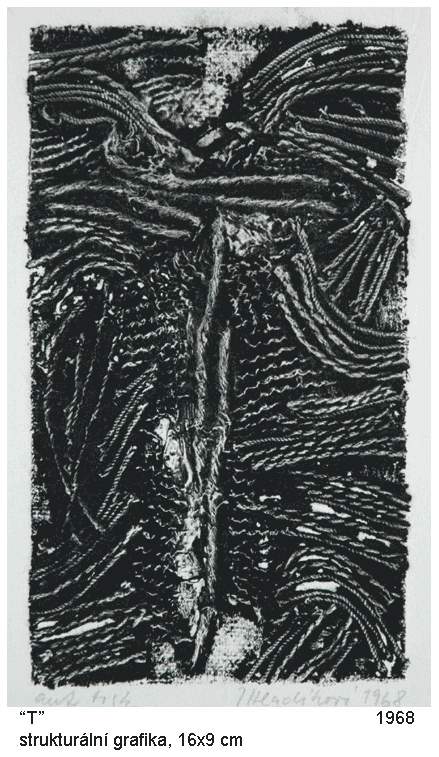
„ Big T“ (structural print), 16 × 9 cm, 1968

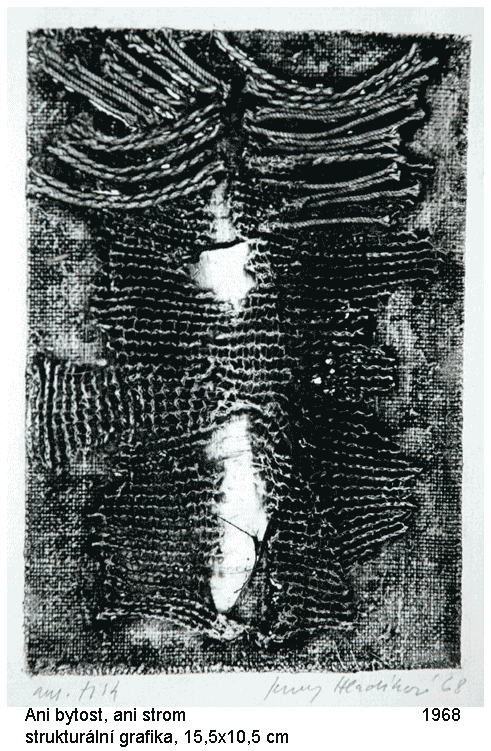
Neither creature nor tree (structural print), 15,5 x 10,5 cm, 1968

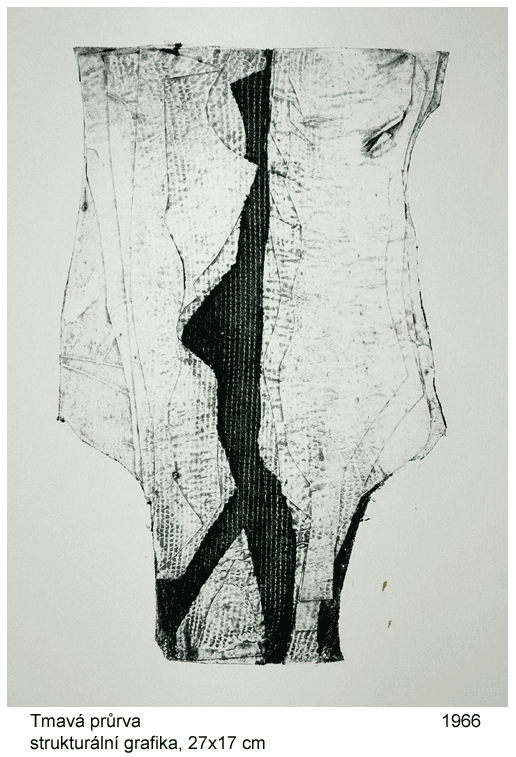
Dark chasm (structural print)), 27 x 17 cm, 1966

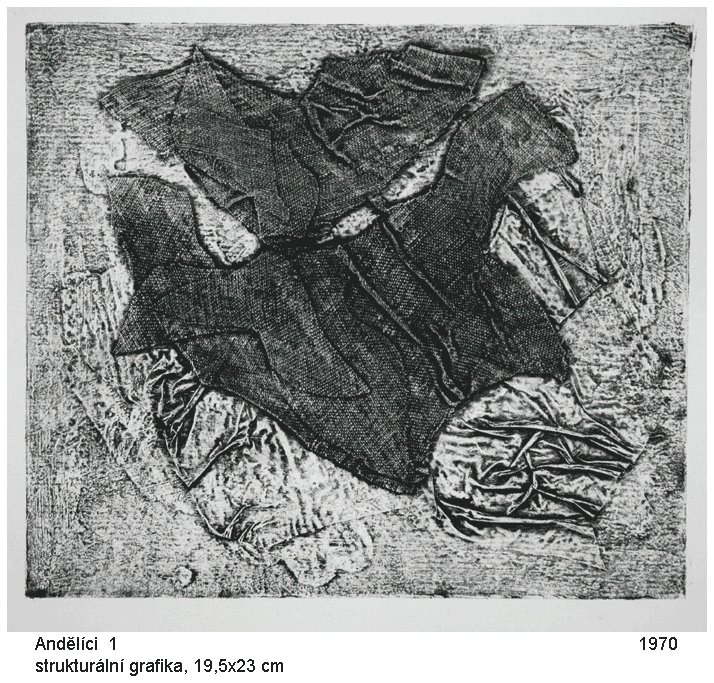
Angels (structural print)), 19,5 x 23 cm, 1970

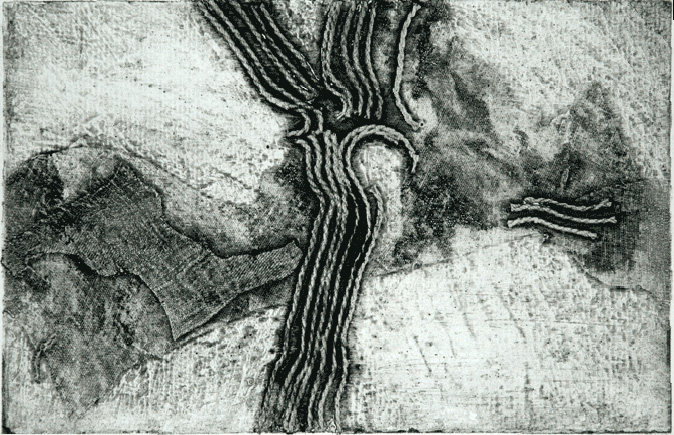
Branches (structural print), 15,5 × 24 cm, 1972

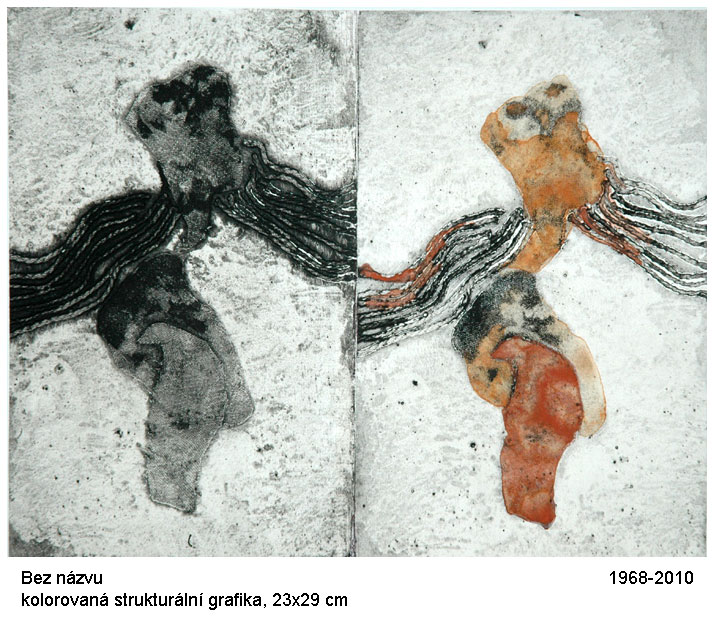
Untitled (coloured structural print), 23 × 29 cm, 1968–2010

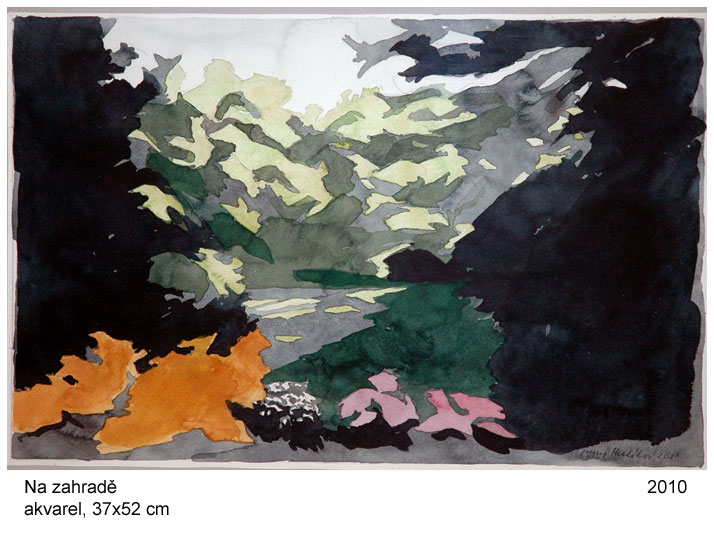
In the garden (watercolour), 2010

=== Tapestry ===
Jenny Hladíková is the author of dozens of large-scale tapestries based on her own themes, at first abstract, later tapestries inspired by details of landscapes and natural processes, transformations of light and colour. She is one of the leading protagonists of author's woven tapestries, which first appeared in exhibitions alongside traditional workshop tapestries in the 1960s and marked a revolution in the concept of this line of textile art.

She wove her first tapestries during her studies, but then consistently devoted herself to printmaking, returning to them again only in 1965, when she assisted Jan Hladík in the creation of the monumental tapestry Blue Garden (1965), woven using the technique of weft-faille.

In 1966–68, she wove five of her own original tapestries, the fourth of which was selected for the prestigious Biennale internationale de la tapiserie in Lausanne in 1967. Already in the 1960s, Jenny Hladíková was one of the most progressive artists who, while not abandoning the traditional rectangular format, used it with distinctive inventiveness. Her works are parables about time, change and growth, expressing the dynamics of movement and growing out of the artist's own process of textile work. The calm surface of the "background", woven with a classical binding, makes contrast to the restless texture. The tapestry Flow (1970) belongs to works of this type.

In the 1960s, Jenny Hladíková converted some of her monotypes and structural prints into tapestries. In a few, she uses compositions of folded flat shapes with irregular outlines, weaving in different coloured yarn to suggest plasticity, disrupting the linear outline (Four Stories, 1967) or accentuating a particular element (Tissue, 1968). The structural system plays a dominant role in the composition, where the dense ropes of structures created by the wrapping technique create an embossed surface on the surface of the tapestry. Structure also had a strong emotional meaning for her, as well as a luminous value.

Some tapestries designed by the Hladík couple were woven by the workshops of the Umělecká řemesla Praha, in which case the signature JJ Hladík is woven in the lower right and the emblem of the Umělecká řemesla in a lime leaf in the lower left. (Note: tapestry in the Parkhotel Praha - in the corridor of the restaurant on the first floor)

Since 1968, she has created a new weaving technique with wool yarn of varying strength, leaving loose fibres in the weft, which she then drapes over the woven warp on the face. This allows her to create a much more dynamic relief composition and suits her intention to capture movement. Jenny Hladíková's distinctive dynamic tapestry Flow (1970) anticipated her other works reflecting her inspiration from nature and its phenomena, such as Tissue Encounter (1972) or the colourful and structurally expressive Place of Encounter (1978).

No longer adhering to a graphic template, the artist freely depicts the drama of natural processes in monumental compositions (Gesture of Green, 270 × 160 cm, 1976; Memory of Heather, 109 × 200 cm, 1977). By this time, she had already achieved a sovereignty in her weaving technique that allowed her to capture optical phenomena such as the reflection of rock formations on the surface of water (Quarry, 172 × 290 cm, 1977). A series of tapestries loosely inspired by movement, the elements and natural phenomena concludes with Baroque Principle (300 × 180 cm, 1980, UPM).

Since the late 1970s, Jenny Hladíková has returned to the classical method of weaving and has made greater use of concrete landscapes as a model (Tree, 1978). She concentrates on capturing mood, the play of light and shadow, and spatial depth. The surface and ripples of the water are a frequent subject ('Opatovice Pond, 1981, Leafing, 1992). In her treatment, a seemingly simple subject such as a staircase offers a subtle shift of perspective in the rectangular frame of the warp, along with a perfect impressionistic illusion of vivid patches of light and shadow (Stairs, 1984). If the subject is a play of light and impression, she moves freely to abstraction (Night-traces of Light, 1987), or to dramatic depictions of perspective (On the Way from Křivoklát, 1996) and spatial depths, capturing the grandeur of natural scenery (Spring Mountains, 1998).

For her realizations in architecture she has collaborated with architects, for example with the author of the modern theatre in Most, Ivo Klimeš. Jenny Hladíková did not refrain from the techniques of non-woven tapestry, originating from Nonwoven fabric (Art protis).

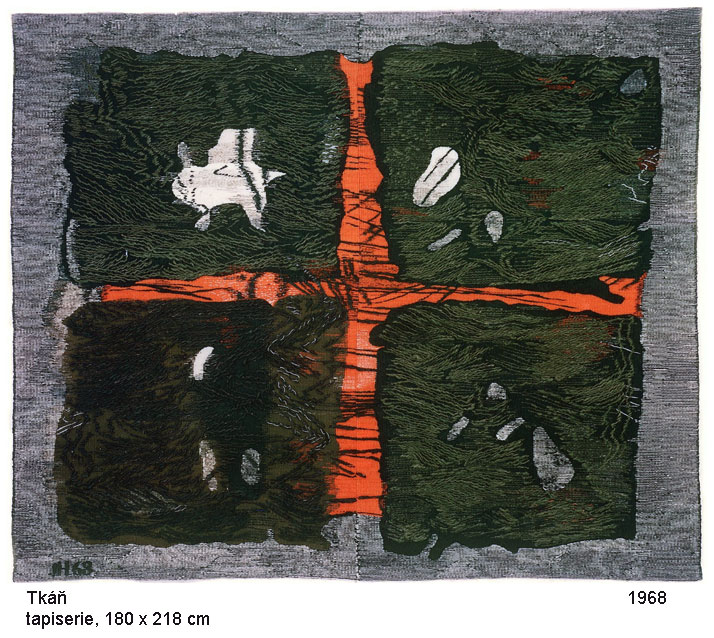
Tissue, author's, hand-woven tapestry 180 × 218 cm, 1968

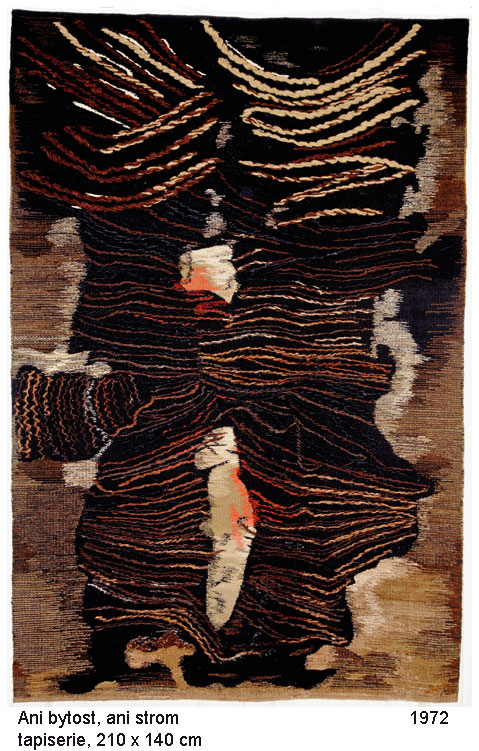
Neither creature nor tree, author's, hand-woven tapestry 210 × 140 cm, 1972

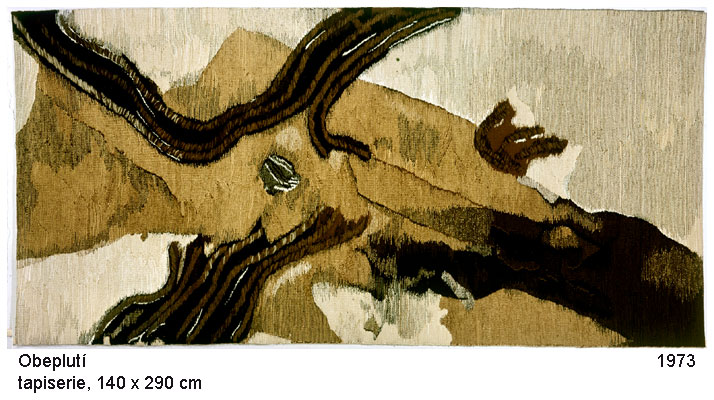
Circumnavigation, author's, hand-woven tapestry 140 × 290 cm, 1973

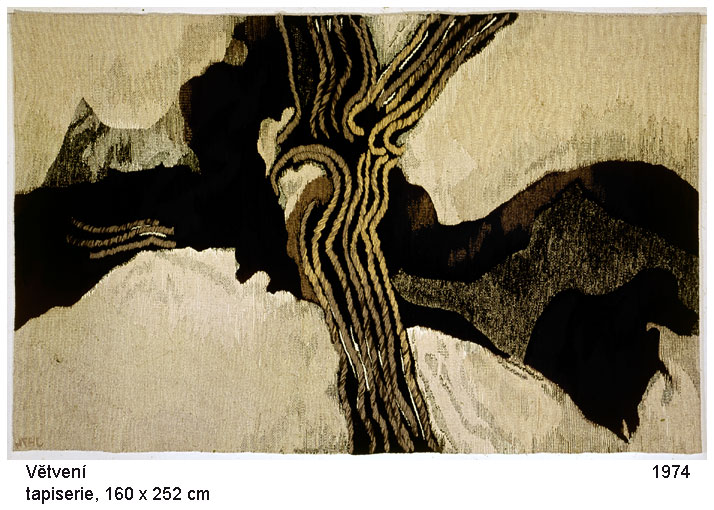
Branching, author's, hand-woven tapestry160 × 252 cm, 1974

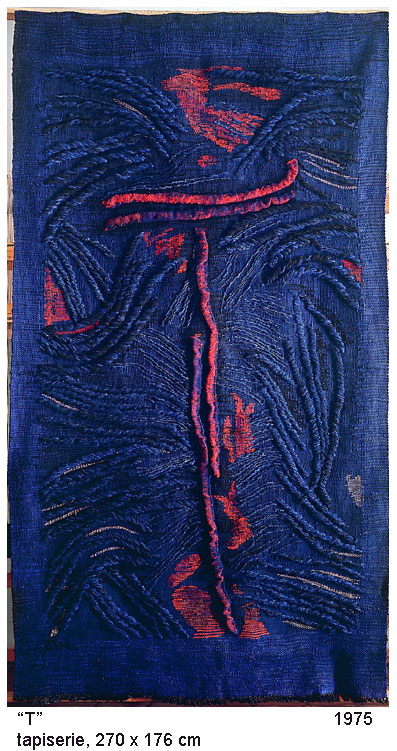
Big T, author's, hand-woven tapestry 270 × 176 cm, 1975

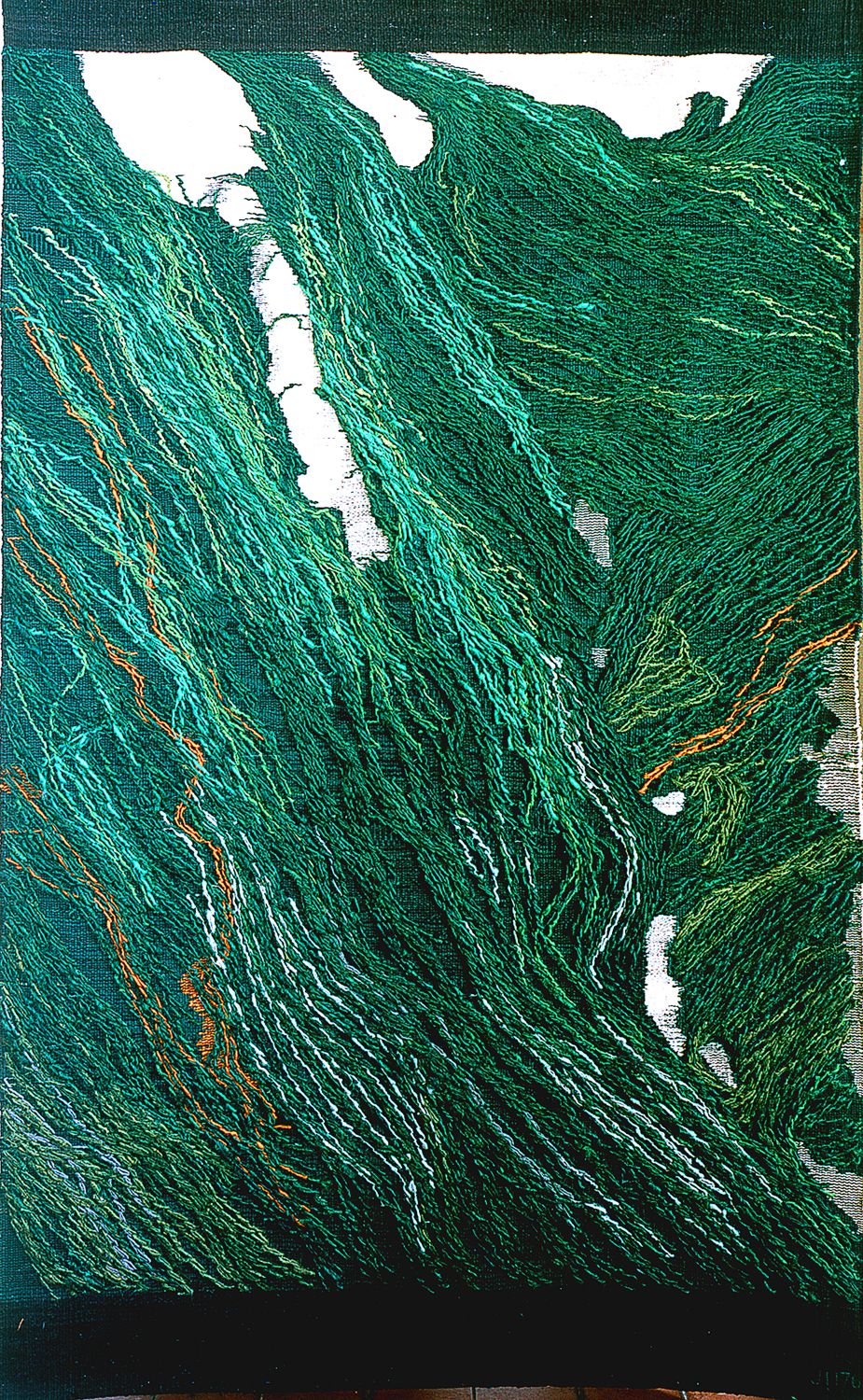
Gesture of Green, author's hand-woven tapestry 270 × 140 cm, 1976

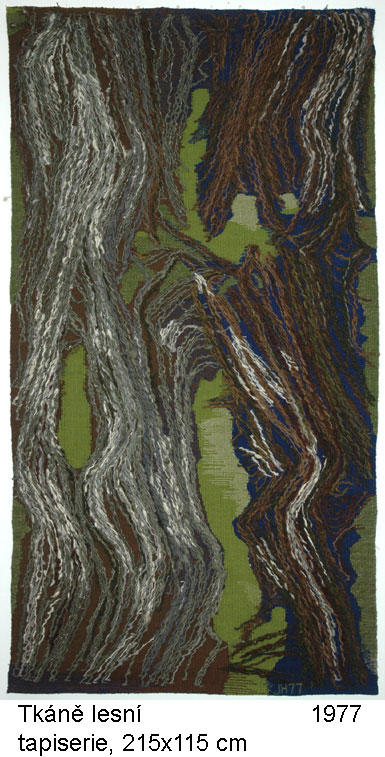
Tissues of the Forest, author's, hand-woven tapestry 215 × 115 cm, 1977

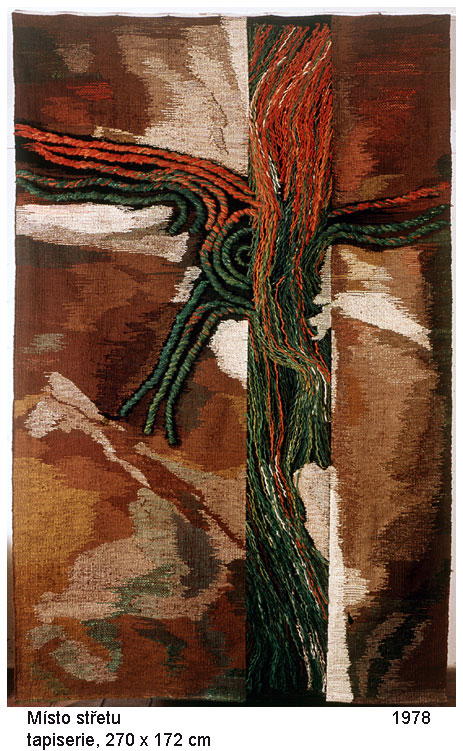
Place of Conflict, author's, hand-woven tapestry 270 × 172 cm, 1978

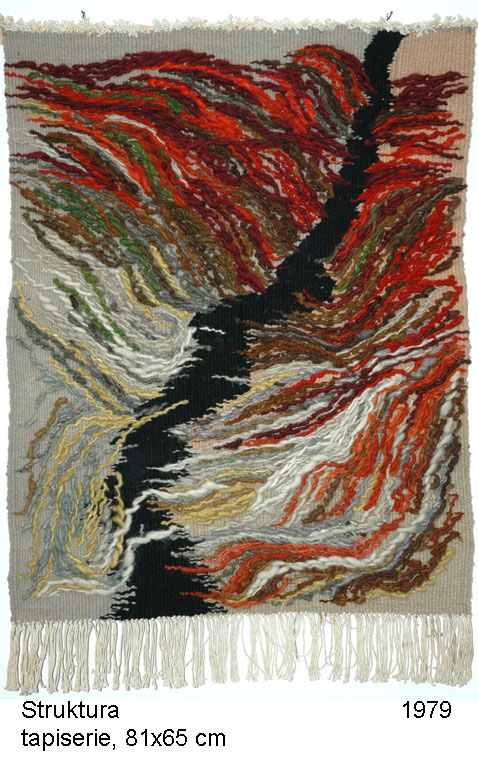
Structure, author's, hand-woven tapestry 81 × 65 cm, 1979

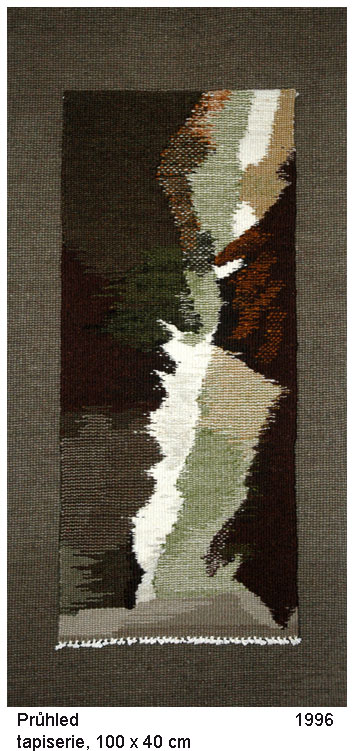
Opening, author's, hand-woven tapestry 100 × 40 cm, 1996

=== Representation in collections (tapestries) ===
- Museum of Decorative Arts in Prague
- Moravian Gallery in Brno
- North Bohemian Museum in Liberec
- Slovak National Gallery in Bratislava
- Central Museum of Woolen Arts, Łódź

=== Private collections ===
- Anne and Jacques Baruch Gallery, Chicago, United States
- Collection des Tapisseries Contemporaines de l'Association Pierre Pauli, Vaud, Switzerland
- Raiffeisenhof, Graz, Austria
- Private collections Italy, Switzerland, England, Prague

=== Realisation in public space ===
- Czechoslovak Airlines, Helsinki
- Czechoslovak Radio
- Ministry of Foreign Affairs, Prague
- North Bohemian Communications Directorate, Ústí nad Labem
- Municipal Theatre, Most: Structure of the landscape
- Forum Hotel, Prague
- Parkhotel (now Mama Shelter Hotel), Prague
- Komerční banka, Liberec
- Unicoop, Prague

=== Exhibitions ===
==== Author's ====
- 1969 Gallery on Charles Square, Prague
- 1973 Jindřichův Hradec (castle) (with Jan Hladík), catalogue
- 1980 North Bohemian Gallery of Fine Arts in Litoměřice
- 1990 Chateau Roztoky u Prahy (with M. Blabolilova and D. Vinopalová)
- 1990 Atrium, Prague (with Jan Hladík)
- 1994 Galerie Bonaventura, Prague
- 1994 Staré Hrady Castle
- 1997 Convent of the Monastery in Žďár nad Sázavou (with Jan Hladík)
- 1999 Tapestries - Monotypes - Graphics (retrospective), Mánes, Prague (curator Kybalová L.)
- 2001 Tapestries, House of Art in Opava (with Jan Hladík, curator Kybalová L.)
- 2001 Tapestry - graphics, Galerie Klenová in Klatovy (with Jan Hladík, curator. Fišer M.)
- 2005 Small Hall of the Trade Fair Palace, National Gallery in Prague, (with Jan Hladík, curator Horneková J.)
- 2005 Tapestry - Journey - Speech (tapestries, drawings, watercolours), Ostrov (curator Čepeláková T.)

==== Collective (selection) ====
- 1966 Československá tapiserie 1956–66 / Czechoslovak Tapestry 1956-66, Prague Castle Riding Hall
- 1967 Biennale internationale de la tapiserie, Lausanne
- 1968 Mezinárodní výstava soudobé tapiserie / International exhibition of contemporary tapestry, Prague
- 1969/70 Exposición internacional de experriencias artistico-textiles, Museo Espaňol de Arte Contemporáneo, Madrid + Tinell, Barcelona
- 1971/72 La Tapisserie tchécoslovaque contemporaine, Amiens, Rennes, Macon, Angers, Mulhouse
- 1972 Manufacture Nationale des Gobelins, Paris
- 1971/72 Československá tapiserie 1966–71 / Czechoslovak Tapestry 1966-71', Queen Anne's Summer Palace Prague, Bratislava Castle
- 1973 Československé užité umění / Czechoslovak applied art, Bruges
- 1975 Tapiserie v architektuře / Tapestry in architecture, Dům umění města Brna (House of Arts, Brno)
- 1976 Focus on Fiber, an International Tapestry Exhibition, Jacques Baruch Gallery, Chicago
- 1977 Exposition Internationale de Tapisserie, La Vigne, le Vin, le Sacré, Musée Jenisch, Vevey (prix de Mécénes)
- 1977/78 Hedendagse Wandtapijten Textielmuseum, Tilburg
- 1978 Tapiseria i staklo u Čehoslovačkoj, Muzej primenjene umetnosti, Belgrade, Sarajevo
- 1981 Textilkunst 81, Stadtausstellung, Linz, Künstlerhaus Vienna
- 1982 Československá tapiserie 20. století / Czechoslovak tapestry of the 20th century, Emmaus Monastery, Prague
- 1985 100 let UPM / 100 years of UPM, Museum of Decorative Arts in Prague
- 1986 Art Textile Contemporrain - La Collection de l'Assotiation Pierre Pauli, Musée des Arts Décoratifs de la Ville de Lausanne, Maison de la Culture du Plateau-Nord-Royal, Montreal
- 1990 Výstava tapiserií / Exhibition of tapestry, Sankturinovský dům, Kutná Hora
- 1991 Alternativy české a slovenské tapiserie / Alternatives of Czech and Slovak tapestry, Brno
- 1993 2e Triennale internationale de Tournai – Tapisserie et Arts de Tissu de l'Autre Europe, Tournai
- 1994 10 Jahre Textilkunst, Galerie in Fernmeldezentrum, Graz
- 1995 110 let UPM / 110 years of UPM, Museum of Decorative Arts in Prague
- 1993/98 Výroční výstavy / Annual exhibitions Umělecká beseda, Prague
- 2000 Art Textile Contemporrain – La Collection de l'Assotiation Pierre Pauli, Lausanne
- 2001 300 Years of Czech Decorative Art, Takasaki Museum of Art, Japan
- 2007 Průzračný svět / A transparent world, Gallery of modern art Roudnice nad Labem
- 2007 Die Durchsichtige Welt, Landschloss, Pirna Zuschendorf
- 2009 25 Jahre Internationale Textilkunst, Graz

== Sources ==
=== Author catalogues ===
- Tomeš J.: Jenny Hladíková - tapiserie a grafika / Tapestry and Graphic Art, SČVU Praha 1969
- Klimešová V., Tomeš J.: Jan Hladík a Jenny Hladíková: Tapiserie / Tapestry, Museum of Decorative Arts in Prague 1973
- Dolejš J.: Jenny Hladíková - tapiserie / tapestry, Jaroslav Svoboda - sklo / glass, SČGVU Litoměřice 1980
- Zemina J.: Jan Hladík, Jenny Hladíková, Atrium Praha 1990
- Jan Hladík, Jenny Hladíková: tapiserie - grafika / Tapestry - Graphic Art, Cisterciana Sarensis, Žďár nad Sázavou 1997
- Jenny Hladíková Tapiserie - Grafika 1963–1998 / Tapestry - Graphic Art 1963-1998, Mánes, Prague 1999
- Kybalová L.: Jenny Hladíková Tapiserie - Grafika / Tapestry - Graphic Art, Dům umění města Opavy 2001
- Jenny Hladíková -Grafika a tapiserie ze 60. let / Graphic Art and Tapestry from 1960s, Galerie Magna, Ostrava 2004
- Jenny Hladíková - tapiserie, monotypy, grafika / tapestry, monotypes, graphic art, Národní dům Prostějov, 2004
- Jan Hladík - Jenny Hladíková, tapiserie / tapestry, National Gallery Prague 2005

=== General sources ===
- Hlaváček L., Hollar 60, Galerie Hollar, Praha 1960
- Kybalová L., Tučná D., Československá tapiserie 1956-1966 / Czechoslovak Tapestry 1956-1966, SČVU 1966
- Šetlík J, Tučná D, La tapisserie tchécoslovaque contemporaine, Manufacture nationale des gobelins, Paris 1972
- Ludmila Kybalová, Současná česká tapiserie / Contemporary Czech tapestry, GVU Roudnice nad Labem 1974
- Hedendaagse ambachtskunst uit Tsjechoslowakije, Bruges 1974
- M. Jarry: La Tapisserie – Art du XXe siécle, Fribourg 1974
- Csehszlovák faluszönyegek 1945–1975, Műcsarnok (Kunsthalle Budapest) 1975
- Czeska i słowacka tkanina artystyczna 1945-1975, Łódź 1975
- Focus on fiber, an international tapestry exhibit, Jacques Baruch Gallery, Chicago 1976
- Viera Luxová, Dagmar Tučná: Československá tapiséria 1945-75 / Czechoslovak Tapestry 1945-75, Bratislava 1978
- Tapiserija i staklo u Čehoslovačkoj, Muzej primenjene umetnosti, Beograd 1978
- Alena Adlerová, Současné užité umění - sklo, keramika, tapiserie, šperk / Contemporary applied art - glass, ceramics, tapestry, jewellery (Authorś individual artworks), North Bohemia Gallery of Fine Arts Litoměřice 1979
- Bohumír Mráz, Marcela Mrázová: Contemporary tapestry / Zeitgenössische Tapiserie, Odeon Praha 1980
- F. P. Thomson: Tapestry – Mirror of History, London 1980; ISBN 978-0-7153-7686-7
- Erika Bileter, Textilkunst 81, 320 s., Institut für künstlerische Textilgestaltung, Linz 1981
- Expoziţie de tapiserie, sticlă, ceramică din r. s. cehoslovacă, Muzeul Colecţiilor de Artă - MNAR (Museum of Art Collections), Bucureşti 1985
- Tučná Dagmar, Tapiserie a skleněné objekty / Tapestries and glass objects, Karlovy Vary Art Gallery 1990, ISBN 80-85014-02-5
- Konstantina Hlaváčková: Jenny Hladíková, in: Anděla Horová (ed.), Nová encyklopedie českého výtvarného umění / New Encyclopedia of Czech Fine Arts, Vol. I., Academia Prague 1995, p. 267; ISBN 80-200-1209-5
- Pavliňák P (ed.) Slovník českých a slovenských výtvarných umělců 1950-1999 (H) / Dictionary of Czech and Slovak Visual Artists 1950-1999 (H), Chagall Art Centre, Ostrava 1999
- André Gavillet, Erika Billeter, Pierre Magnenat, Anic Zanci: Art Textile Contemporain/Contemporary Textile Art : Collection of the Pierre Pauli Association, 2000, Benteli Verlag; ISBN 978-3-7165-1212-8; ISBN 3-7165-1212-5
- 300 Years of Czech Decorative Art, Takasaki Museum of Art, Takasaki 2001
- Umělecká beseda 1863-2003, Galerie hlavního města Prahy 2003
- Průzračný svět / Durchsichtige Welt, Galerie moderního umění, Roudnice nad Labem 2007
- Advocates for Art: Polish and Czech Fiber Artists from the Anne and Jacques Baruch Collection, 2010, Mayer Thurman C.C., ISBN 1-930230-39-7
- In Art There is Freedom, Umělecká beseda, Praha 2013
- Taťána Šteiglová: Česká textilní tvorba druhé poloviny 20. století / Czech Textile Art of the Second Half of the 20th Century. Ped. F. Palackého University, Olomouc 2015, ISBN 978-80-244-4636-3on line
- Umělecká beseda, katalogy výstav Výtvarného odboru UB / catalogues of exhibitions of the Art Department of UB 1994-2000
