= Jan Hladík (artist) =

Czech artist (1927–2018)

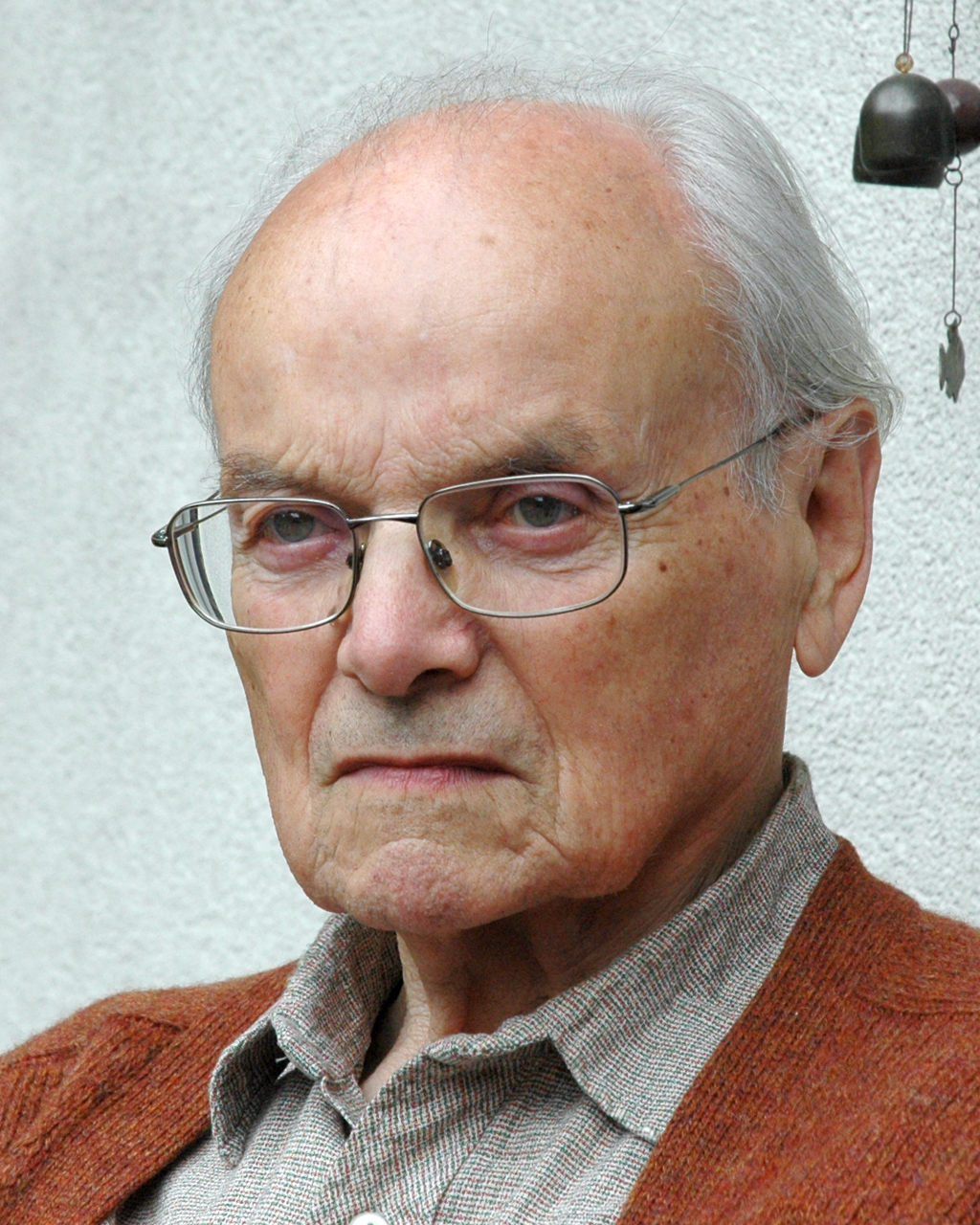
- Jan Hladík (2012)
- Born: 21 May 1927; Prague, Czechoslovakia
- Died: 3 June 2018 (aged 91); Prague, Czech Republic
- Education: High School of Arts and Crafts
- Occupations: textile artist, printmaker, painter, illustrator
- Spouse: Jenny Hladíková

Jan Hladik' (21 May 1927 – 3 June 2018) was a Czech textile artist, printmaker, painter and illustrator.

== Life ==
In 1942–1944, during World War II, Jan Hladík studied at the State Graphic School in Prague under Prof. Jaroslav Vodrážka and Prof. Karel Müller. His classmates were Václav Sivko, Vladimír Fuka or Mikuláš Medek. In 1945, he was admitted to the High School of Arts and Crafts, and chosen by prof. Alois Fišárek, head of the studio of applied painting and textile art. In 1947, he took a month-long study tour to Paris and Brittany with his classmates and prof. Fišárek to see contemporary French and world art. Jan Hladík completed his studies in 1950 with a collection of decorative fabrics made using the serigraphy printing technique.

Soon after the 1948 Czechoslovak coup d'état, the Hladík family was persecuted. Jan Hladík was conscripted into the PTP labour camp, the family property was confiscated, his father was arrested and imprisoned. After serious electric shock injury at the military service and his return to civilian life, Jan Hladík found it difficult to find commissions in the field of textile design, despite the support of Prof. Fišárek. He made his living as a printmaker, selling drawings and ceramics, and occasionally illustrating books.

In 1955 he married Jenny Hršelová and returned to handmade textile art. For the exhibition of the newly established Group 7 of textile artists (1958) he wove the first tapestries with abstract motifs based on his own graphic designs. Alongside his original tapestries, which became his main artistic output from 1959 onwards, he created graphic sheets (woodcuts, linocuts, etchings and especially mixed media using assemblage), tempera drawings and oil paintings.

In 1960, he was accepted into the Union of Czechoslovak Visual Artists (SČVU) and exhibited textile works at the Milan Triennial. In 1963 he had his first solo exhibition in Prague and in 1965 he was invited for the first time to the Biennale Internationale de la Tapisserie in Lausanne where he was then selected again in 1967, 1969, 1977 and 1979. He became one of the founders of the Pierre Pauli Association (1979).

Hladík's friendship with Josef Topol and the actors of Divadlo za branou (Theatre behind the gate) in the early 1970s inspired him to create tapestries of theatre scenes (Tomášová, Tříska, and others).

He had been a member of Czech Graphic Artists Association Hollar since 1967 and had his first exhibition of graphic work in 1970 just before the regime's liquidation of the association's activities and the closure of the exhibition hall. His second solo exhibition of graphic art took place more than 12 years after the fall of the communist regime in 2002.

He died in June 2018 in Prague.

=== Honours and prizes ===
- 1966 Award for Applied Arts, Union of Czechoslovak Visual Artists
- 1967 Honorable mention for participation in EXPO 67, Montreal
- 2007 Hollar Foundation Award

== Work ==
=== Printmaking, drawing, painting ===
The first drawings and graphic sheets produced at the end of the war in high school were studies of Cubist principles of painting and image construction, influenced especially by Bohumil Kubišta. Bohumil Kubišta's monograph was brought to Jan Hladík in 1944 by his classmate Mikuláš Medek.

A trip to Paris in 1947 and direct experience with the artworks of the Surrealists, Picasso, Braque and other painters led to a gradual relaxation of artistic expression. By the end of the 1950s he made his first abstract prints, alongside figurative drawings and paintings.

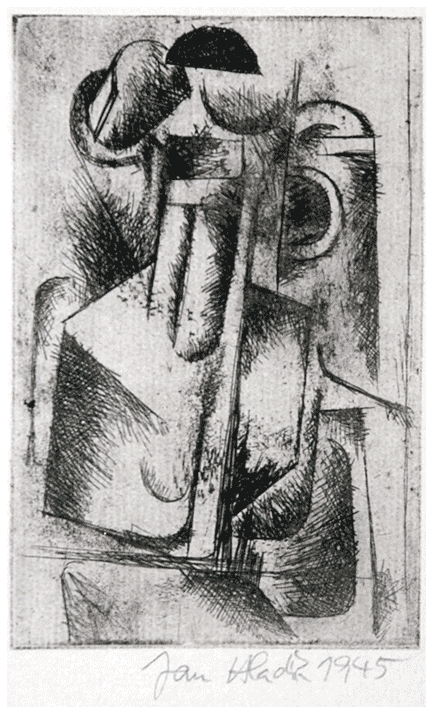
Cubist composition, etching, 1945

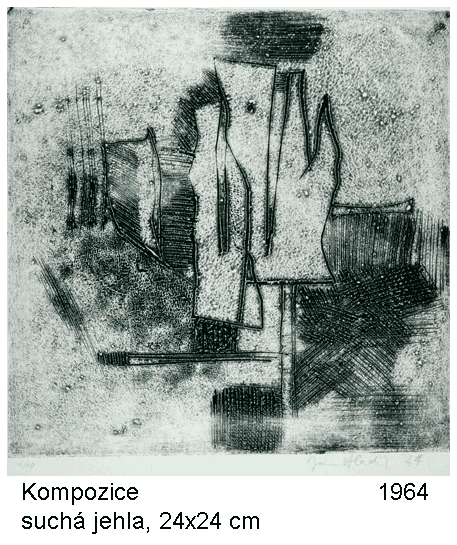
Composition, drypoint 24 × 24 cm, 1964

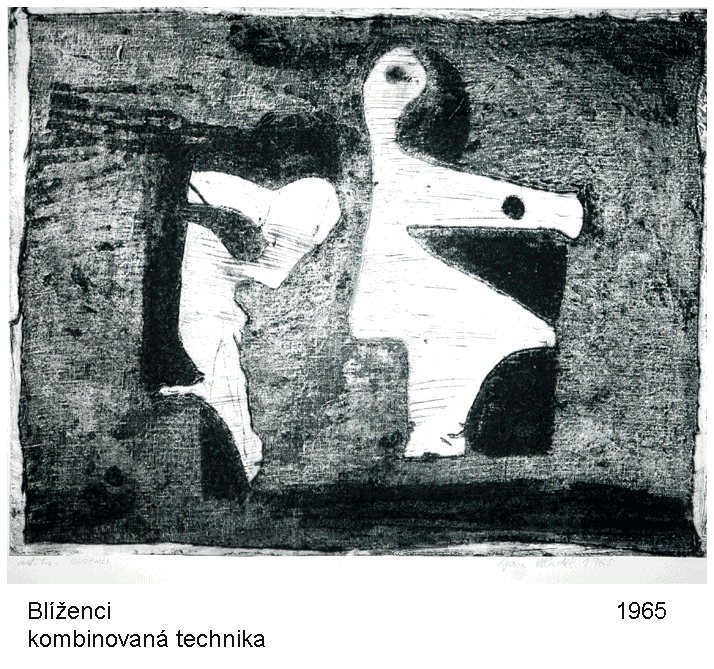
Gemini, mixed media, 1965

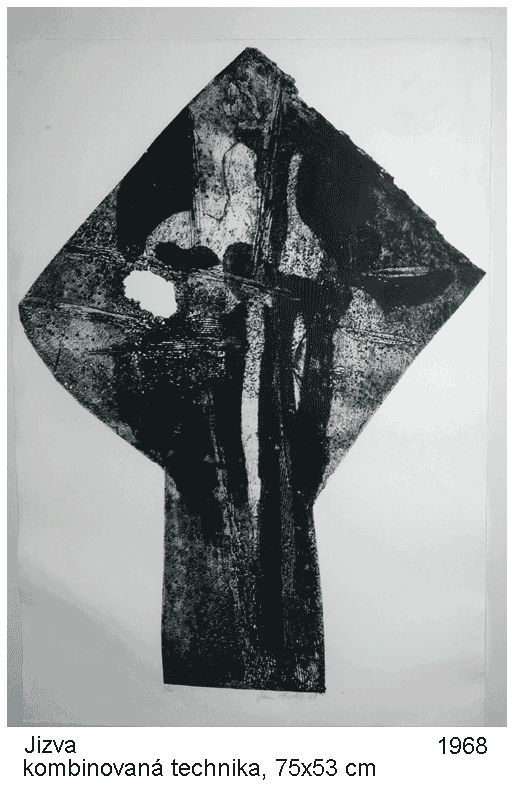
Scar, mixed media 75 × 53 cm, 1968

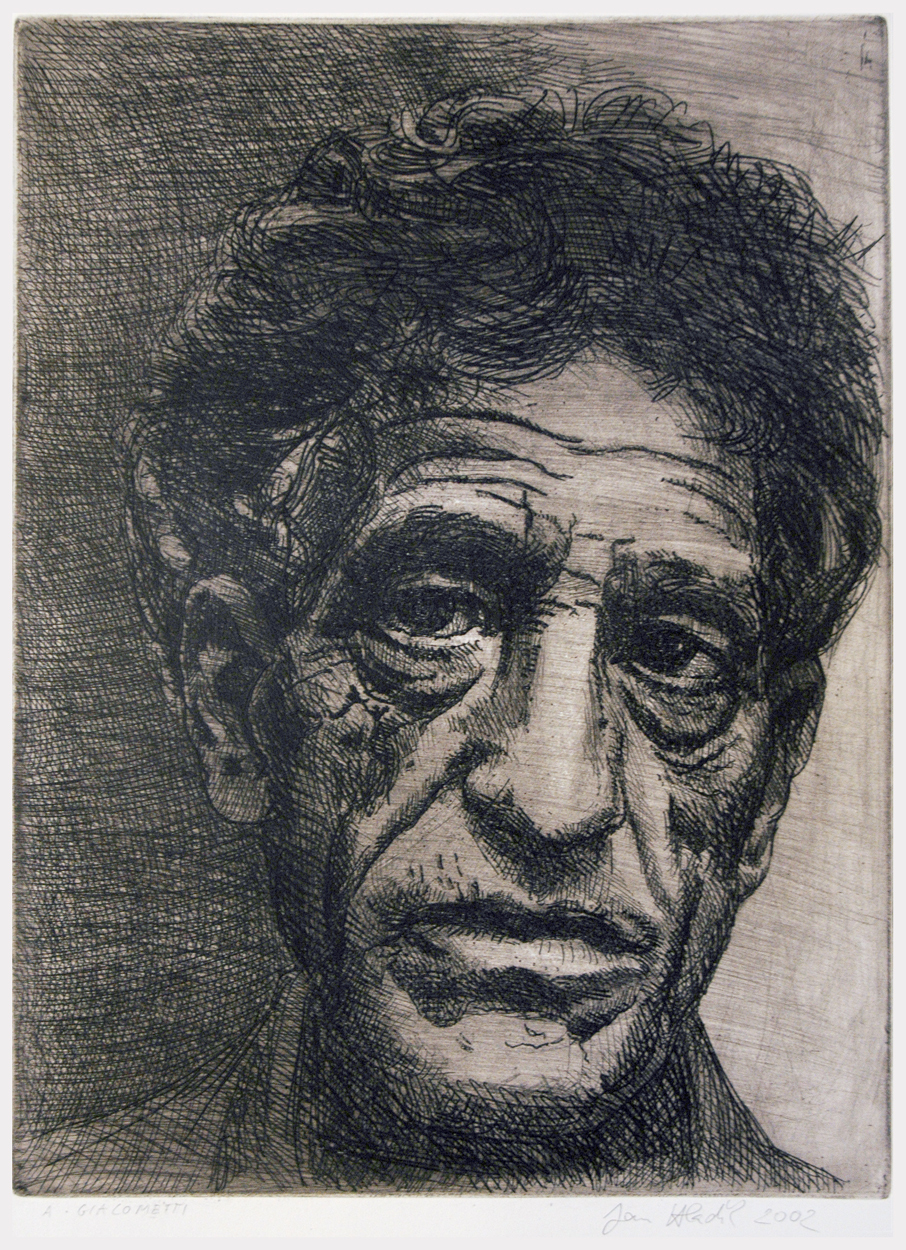
Alberto Giacometti, etching

From the mid-1960s onwards, Hladík's works were part of a stream of New Figuration with overlaps towards material abstraction. At that time he created a coherent series of large-scale monotypes from oil paintings combined with scraps of textiles and other materials, sometimes on unconventional metal matrices (rusted pieces of sheet metal, round metal targets).

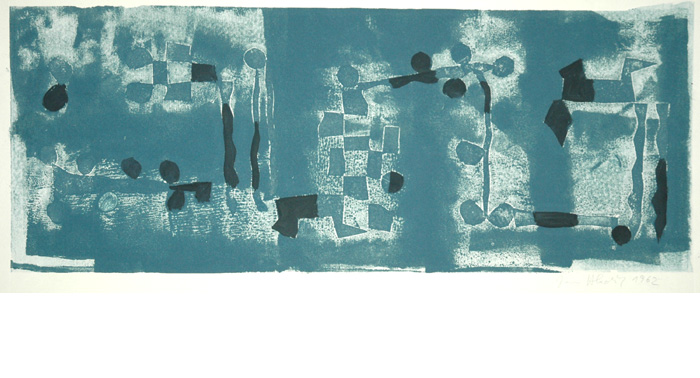
Monotype, 1962

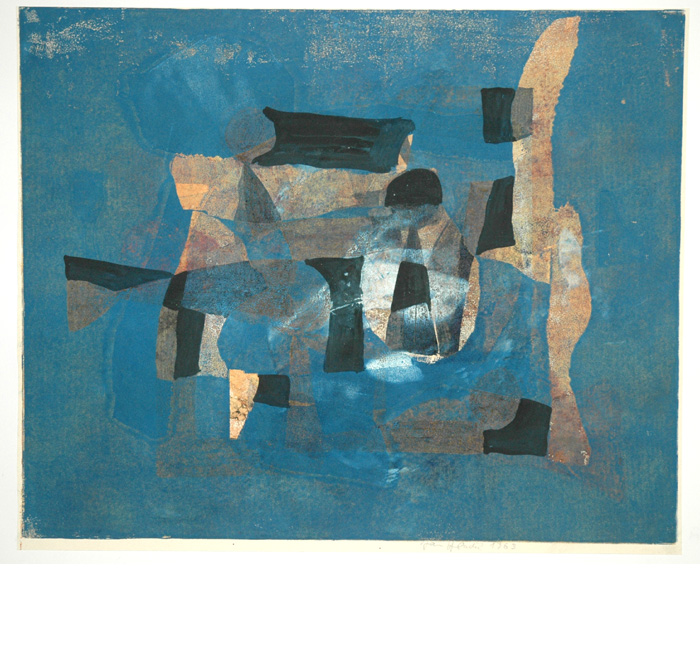
Monotype, 1963

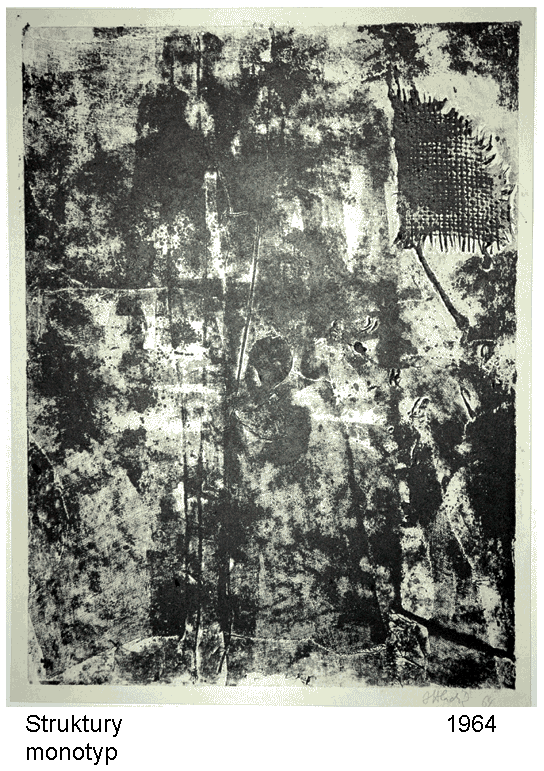
Structures, monotype, 1964

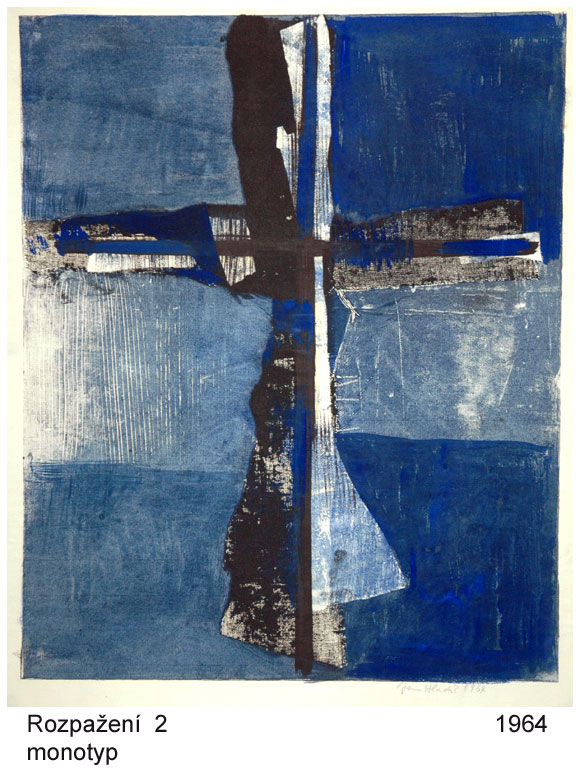
Open arms 2, monotype, 1964

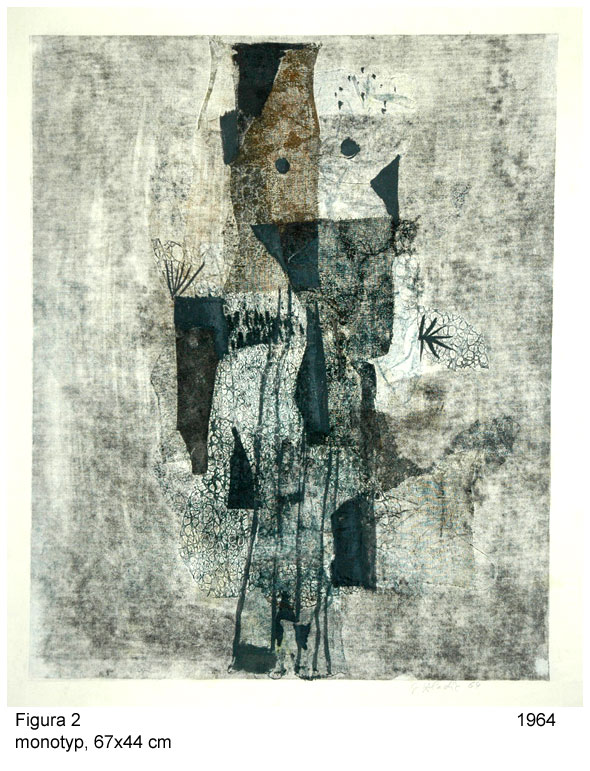
Figure, monotype 67 × 44 cm, 1964

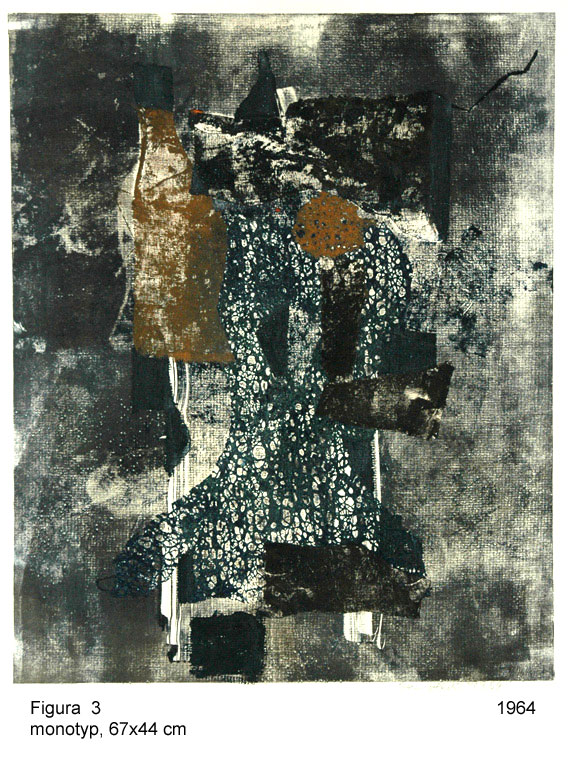
Figure 3, monotype 67 × 44 cm, 1964

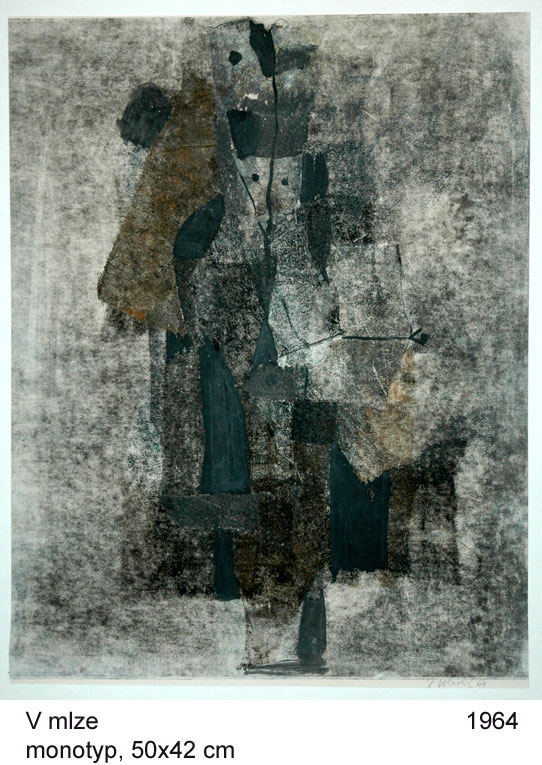
In the mist, monotype 50 × 42 cm, 1964

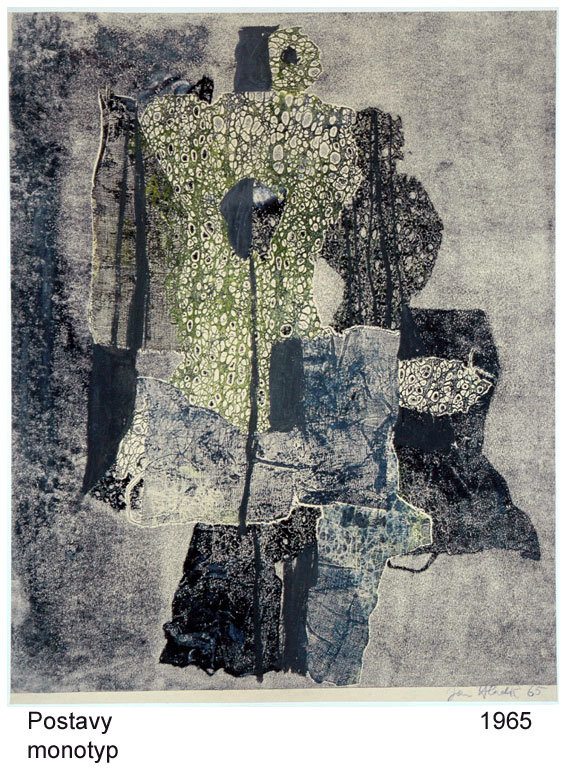
Figures, monotype, 1965

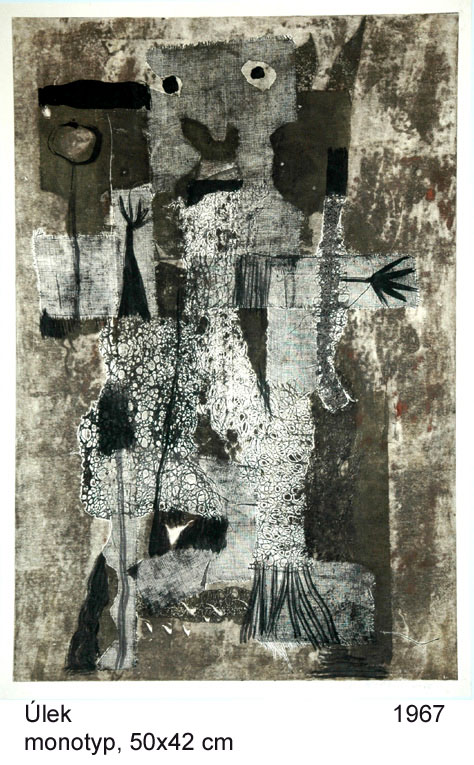
Frightening, monotype 50 × 42 cm, 1967

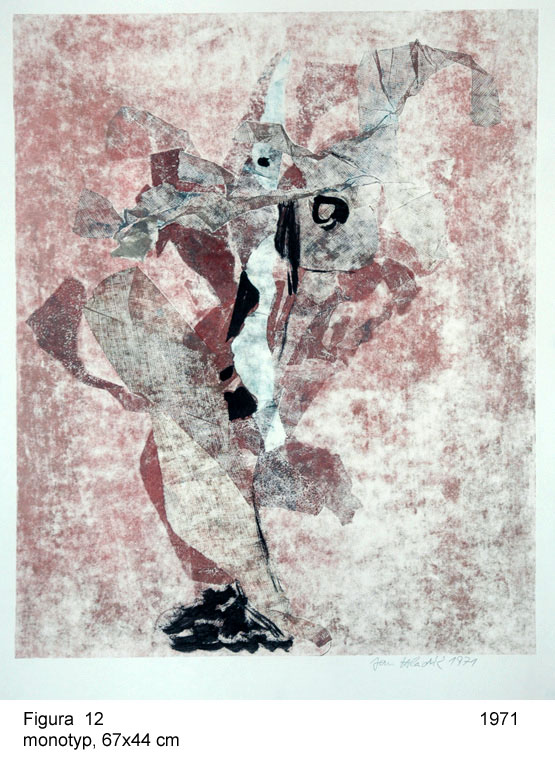
Figure 12, monotype 67 × 42 cm, 1971

The motifs of the prints and tempera drawings range from existential situations (Traces, Abyss, Decay) and strange figures (The Devourers, Big and Small, Grotesque) to abstract motifs (In the Circle, In the Plane, Scar, Composition).

In the 1970s, Jan Hladík interrupted his graphic work and returned to it again only after 1989, mostly using the dry needle technique. At that time, he also created a number of oil paintings on graphic matrices.

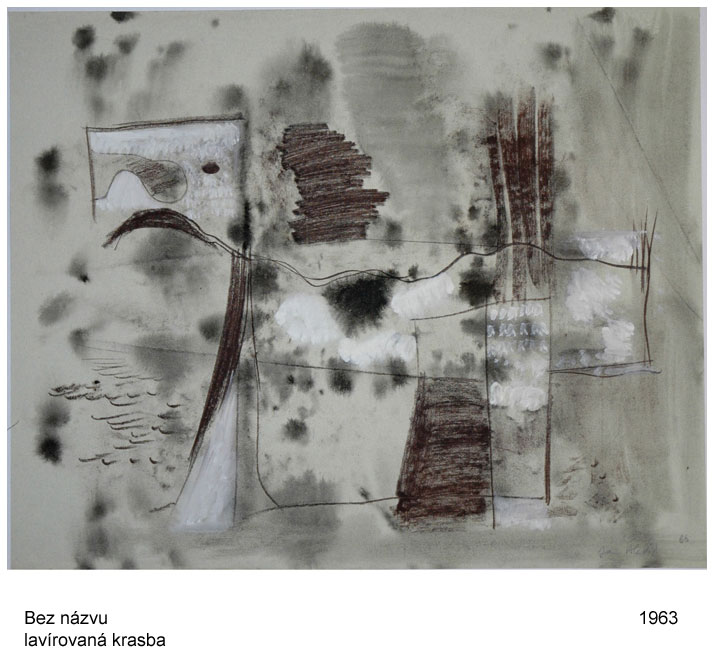
Untitled, washed out drawing, 1963

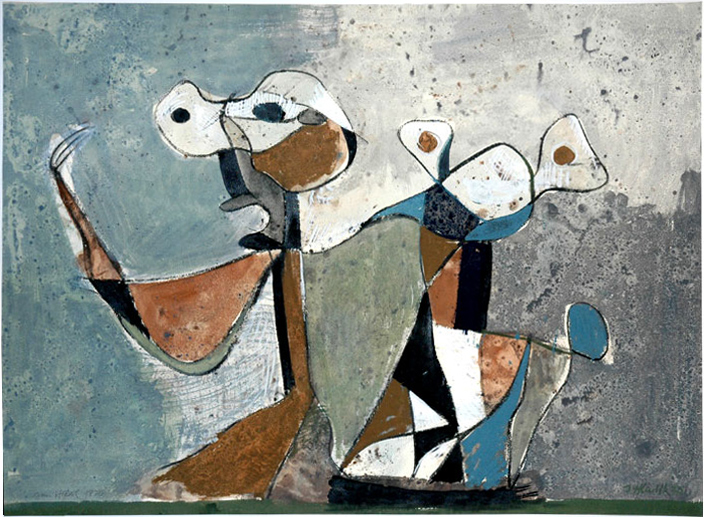
Dramatic Situation, tempera on paper, 1966

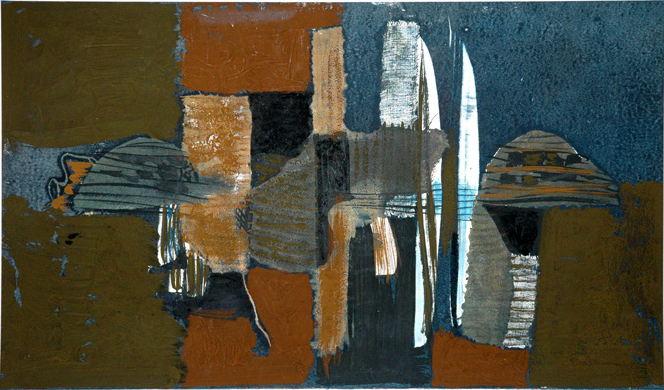
Composition, tempera on paper, 1972

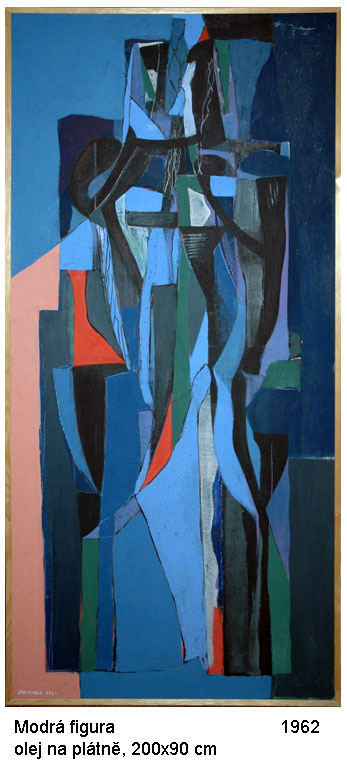
Blue Figure, oil on canvas 200 × 90 cm, 1962

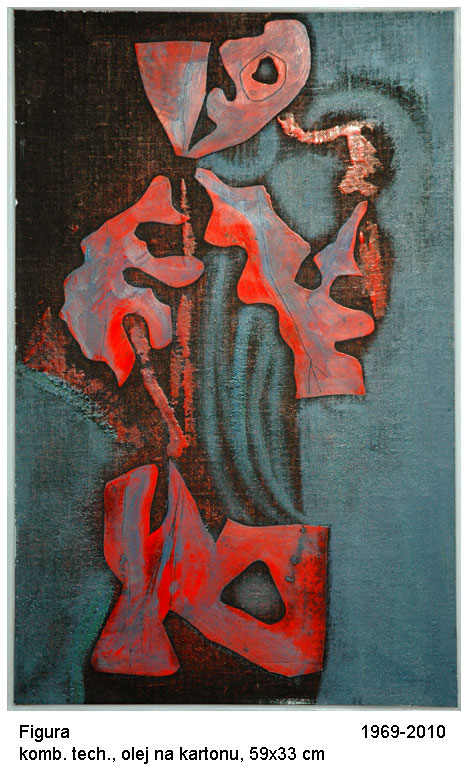
Figure, K.T., oil on cardboard, 59 × 33 cm, 1969–2010

=== Textile art and tapestry ===
Jan Hladík applied his original background in textile art in graduate serigraphs on textiles, designs for decorative fabrics and headscarfs with motifs of highly stylized figures, and especially on a large-scale abstract composition (15 × 3.5 m) for the Expo Montreal in 1967.

The artist's first tapestries, woven from 1959 onwards according to designs created first as graphic prints and drawings (Gemini, monotype 1965, tapestry 1967), range in subject matter from figures with post-Cubist morphology (Shieldmaker, 1968, Tokyo) to abstract motifs (Stele-Scar, 1970).

The mid-1970s marked a radical turn to figurative work in tapestry with The Kiss of Judas of St. Gill (1974), based on a Romanesque relief. The classical tapestry technique, grasped in an original and subjective way, allows Hladík to actively experience every detail and express psychological expression while weaving.

This is followed by a series of expressive scenes with actors from Divadlo za branou (Theatre behind the gate), woven after photographs by Josef Koudelka (Marie, Meeting-not meeting). Hladík's motif is not a mere figure, but "expressive human feelings, their meeting and passing by"

Jan Hladík was also inspired by details of figures in classical works (Jan Vermeer, Botticelli), which he quotes, but treats them freely, capturing movement (The Dancer), the scene (The Blind Men after Brueghel) or psychological studies of faces (Franz Kafka, Samuel Beckett, The Scream). A highlight work from 1977 is a difficult reinterpretation of the perspective of the painting Lamentation of Christ after Andrea Mantegna.

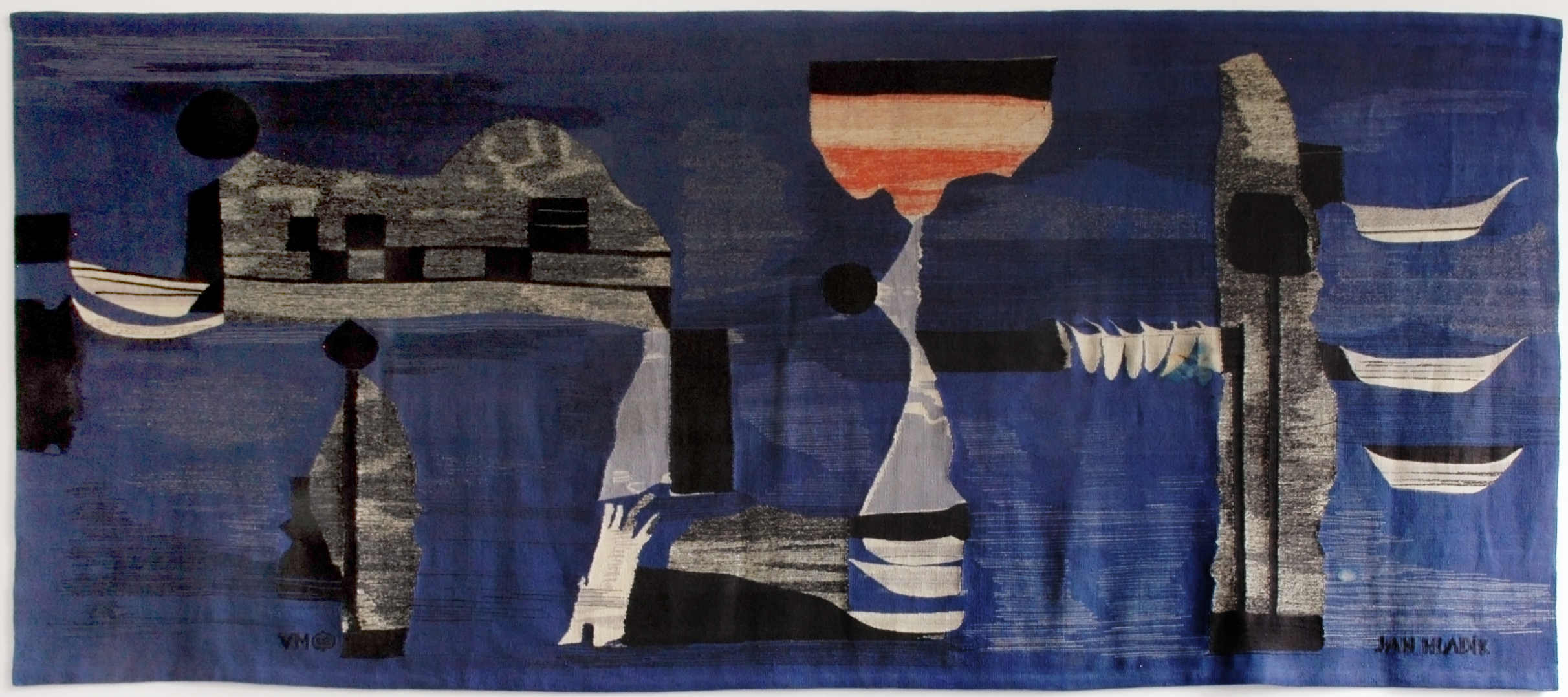
Author's tapestry Blue garden, 190 × 430 cm, 1965 (with Jenny Hladík)

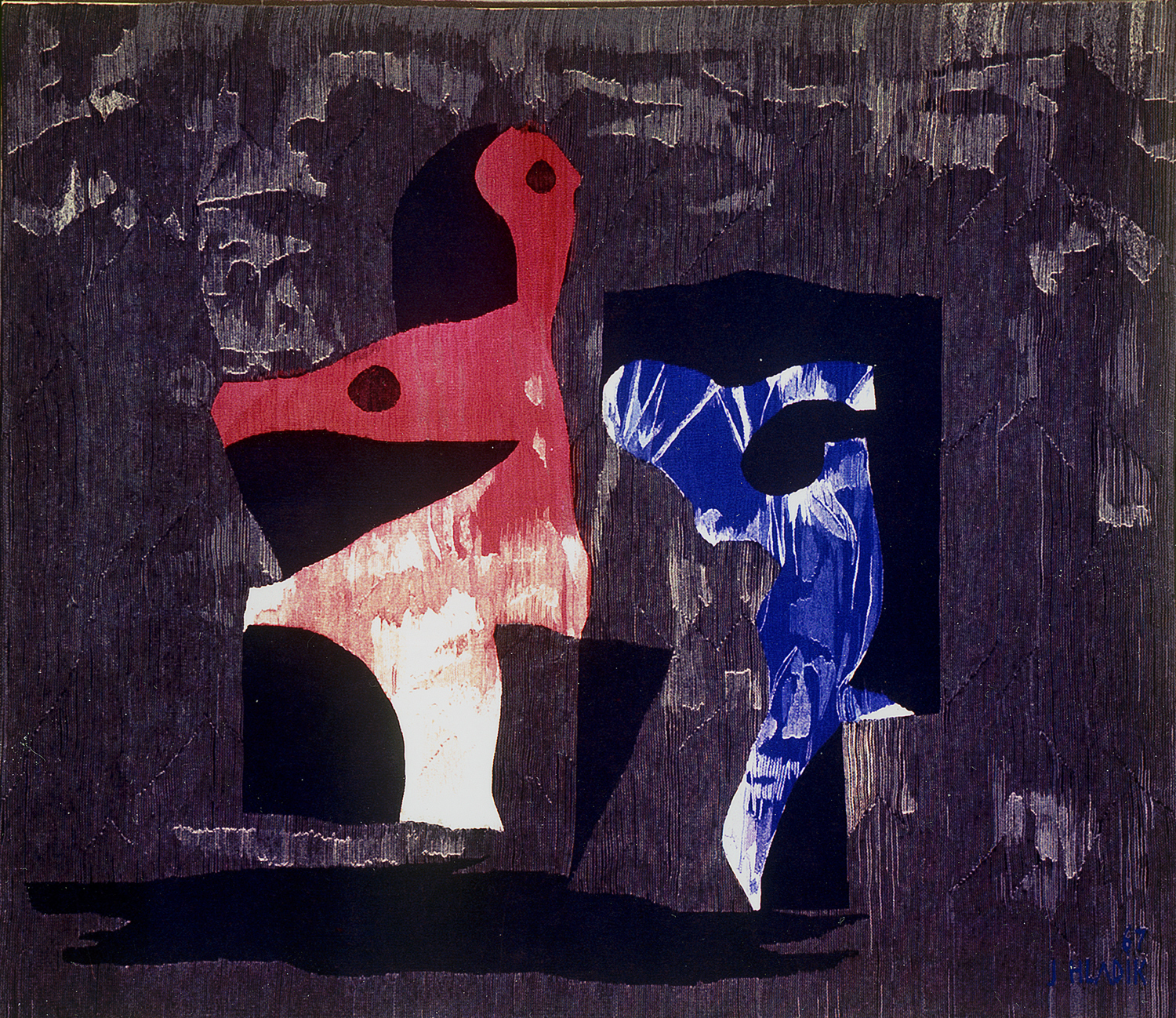
Author's tapestry Gemini (1967), 260 × 300 cm

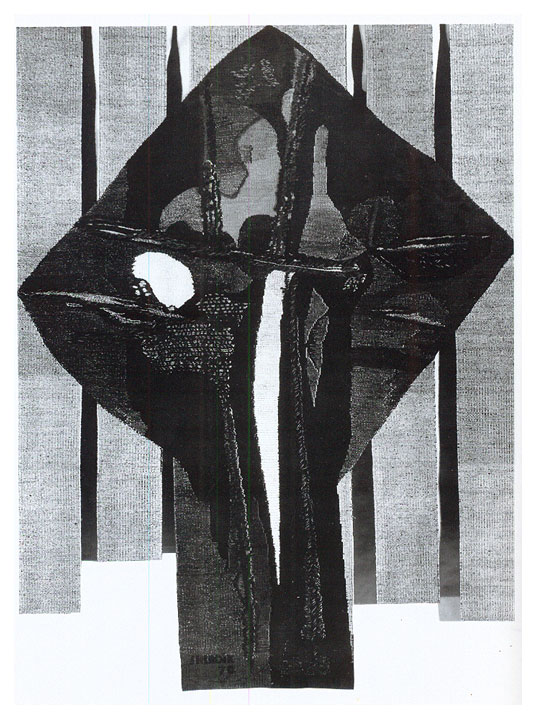
Author's tapestry Stele - Scar, 300 × 220 cm, 1970

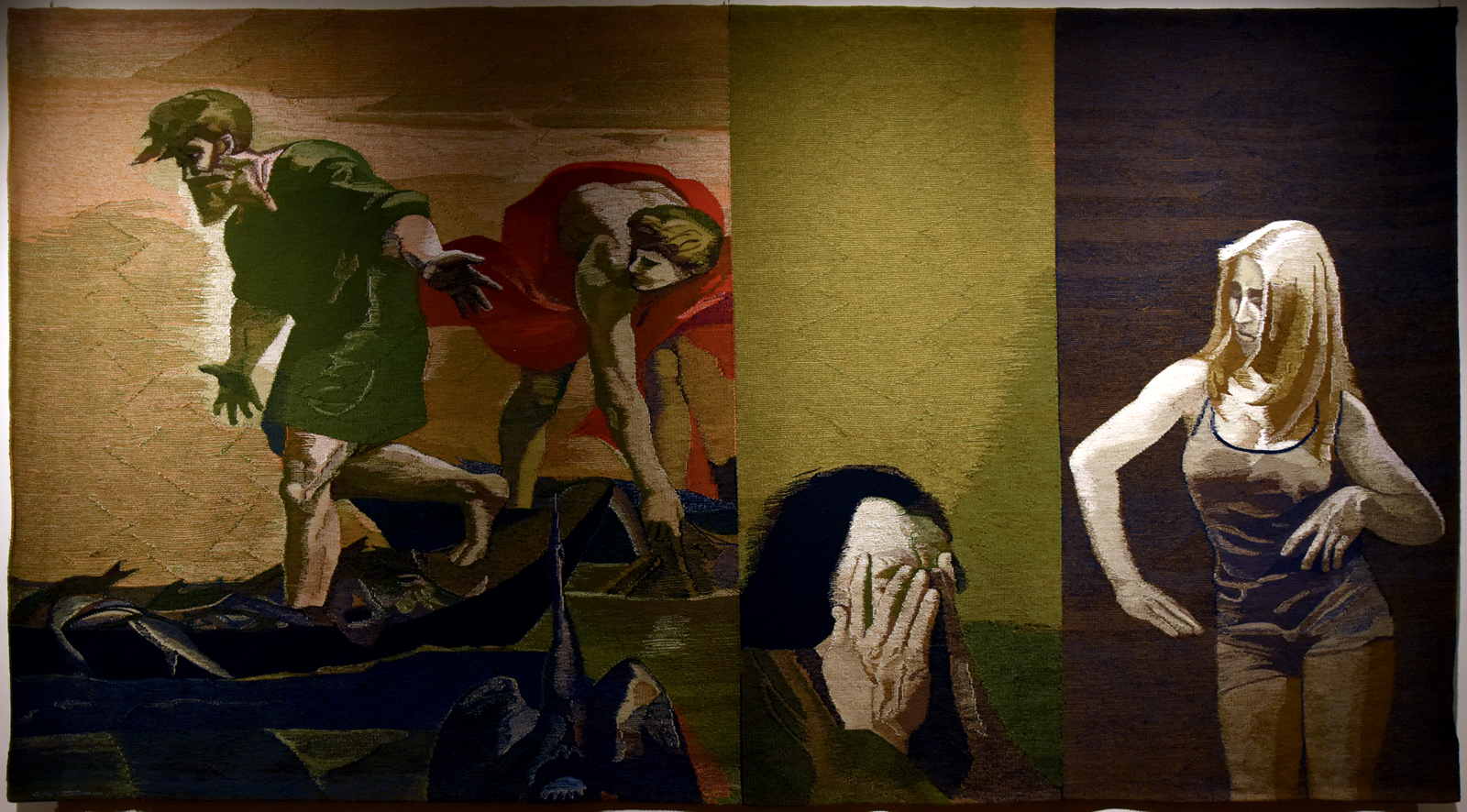
Author's tapestry Some of Us, 290 × 540 cm, 1977–1978

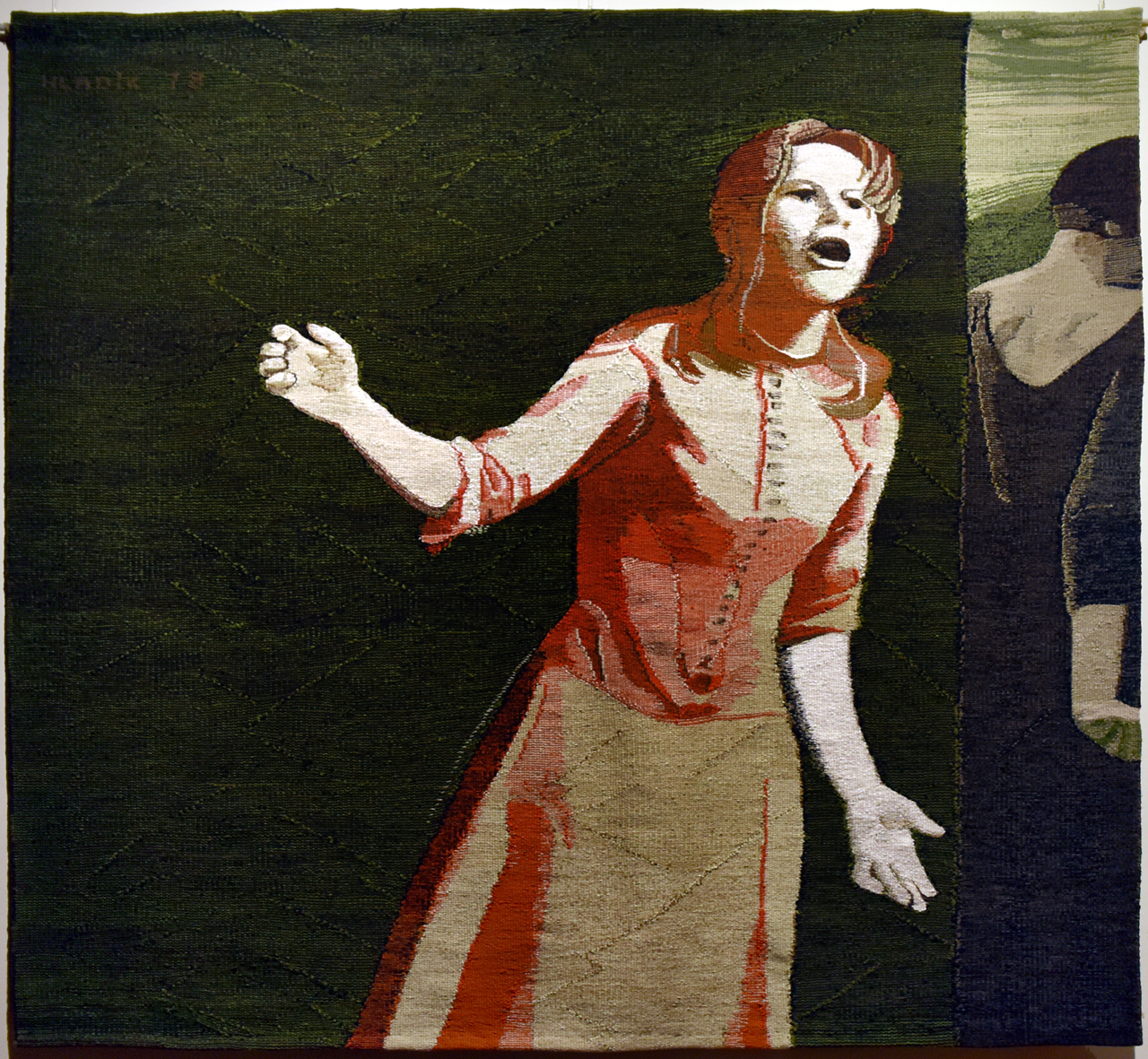
Author's tapestry Marie Tomášová - Voice, 240 × 260 cm, 1978

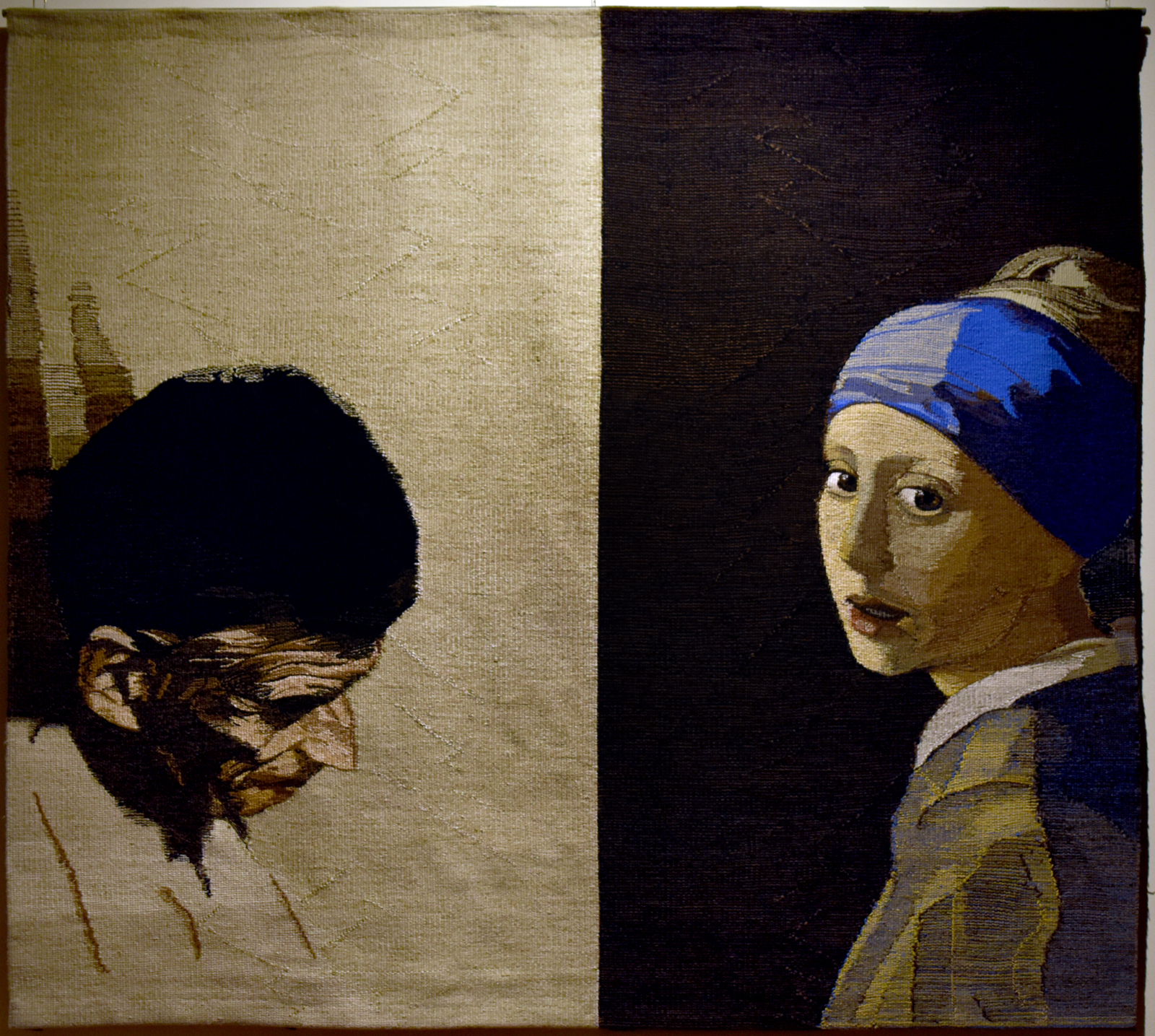
Author's tapestry Faces, 230 × 255 cm, 1979

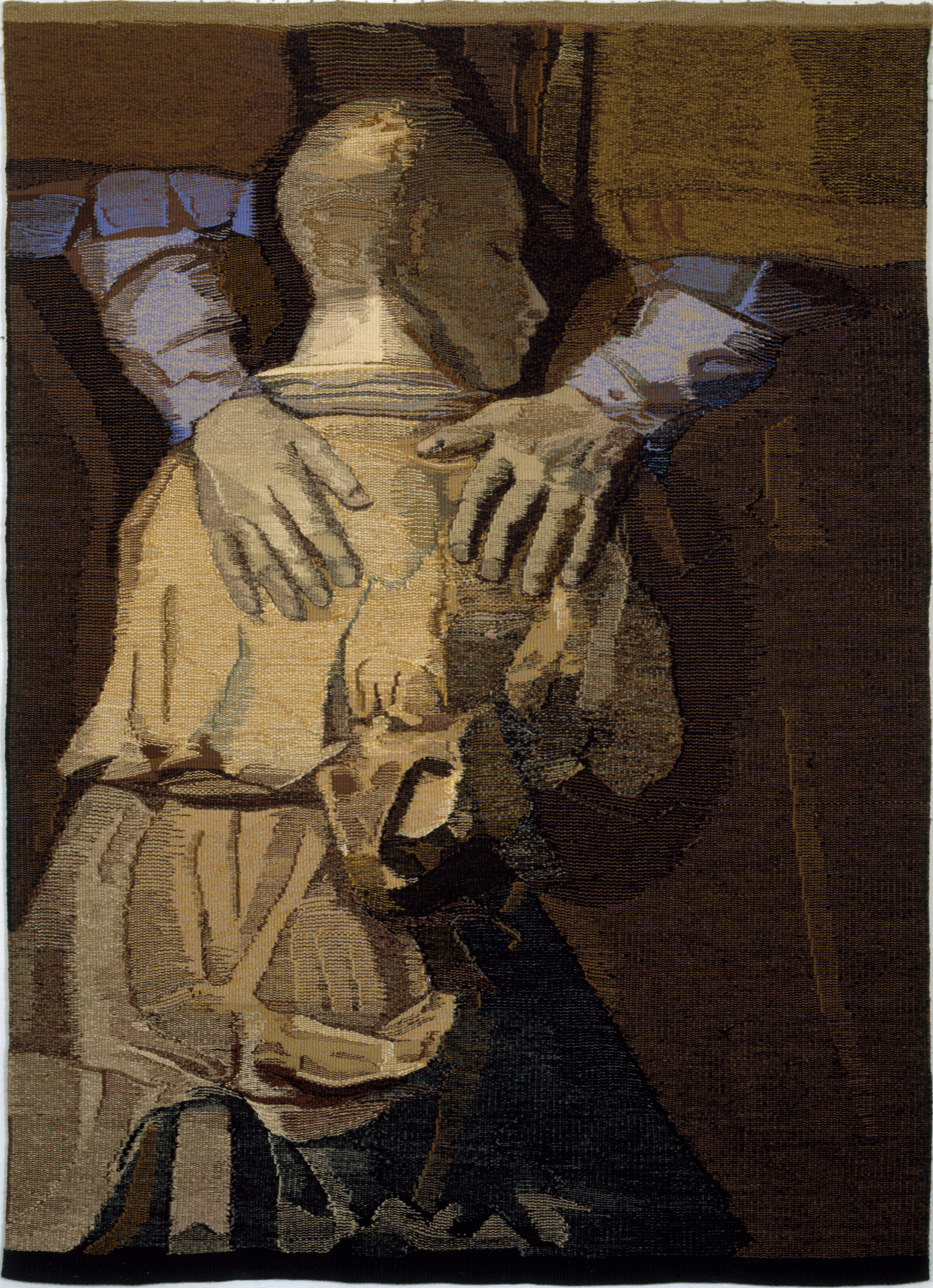
Author's tapestry Return (Rembrandt), author's tapestry 237 × 170 cm, 1981

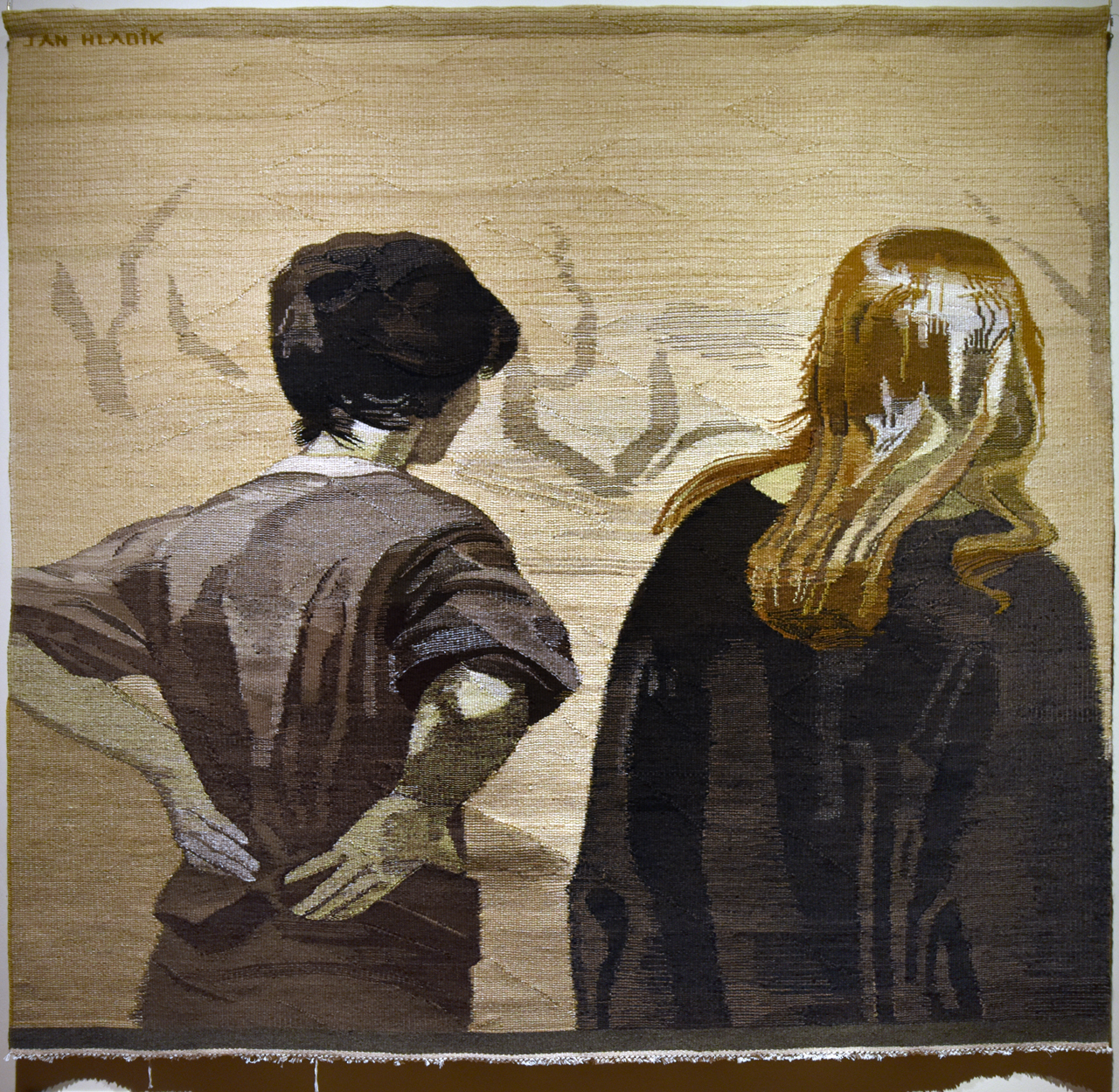
Author's tapestry Reversed Faces, 240 × 247 cm, 1989

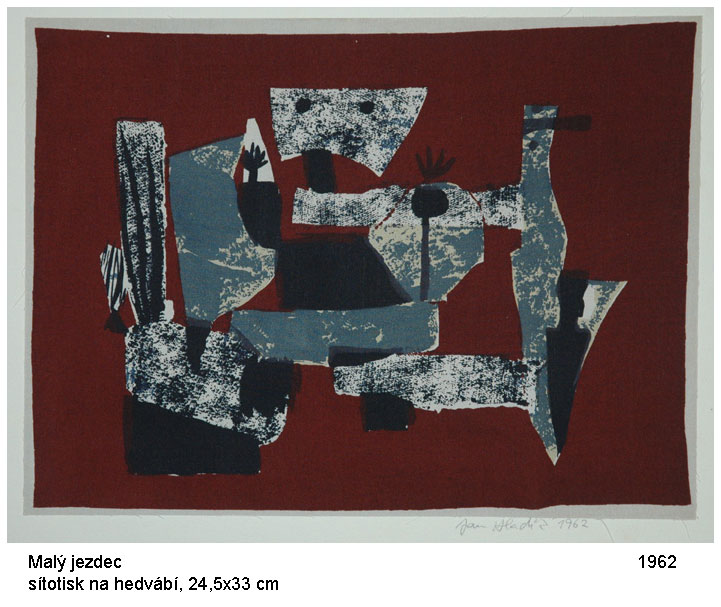
The Little Rider, silk screen print, 1962

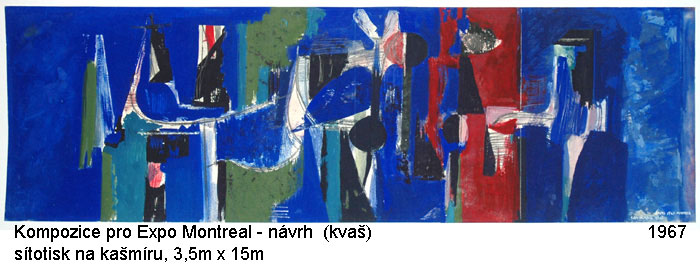
composition for Expo Montreal, silkscreen on cashmere, 3.5 × 15 m, 1967

=== Representation in collections (tapestries) ===
- Museum of Decorative Arts in Prague
- Moravian Gallery in Brno
- North Bohemian Museum in Liberec
- Slovak National Gallery in Bratislava
- Jacques Baruch Gallery, Chicago
- Association Pierre Pauli, Lausanne
- Gallery Kawashima, Tokyo
- Musei Vaticani
- Central Museum of Woolen Arts, Łódź

=== Exhibitions ===
==== Author's ====
- 1963 prints, tapestries, paintings Fronta Gallery, Prague
- 1966 prints, tapestries, Jindřichův Hradec (castle)
- 1970 prints (etching, mixed media), Hollar Gallery, Prague
- 1973 Jindřichův Hradec (castle), (with Jenny Hladíková)
- 1990 Atrium, Prague (with Jenny Hladíková)
- 1992 graphics, tapestries, Staré Hrady
- 1995 prints, tapestries, Imperial Stables of Prague Castle
- 1997 tapestries and prints, Convent of the Monastery in Žďár nad Sázavou, (with Jenny Hladíková, curator Kybalová L.)
- 2001 Jan Hladík and Jenny Hladíková - tapestries and graphics, House of Art Opava, (curator Kybalová L.)
- 2001 Jan Hladík and Jenny Hladíková - tapestries and graphics, Galerie Klenová in Klatovy, (curator Fišer M.)
- 2002 retrospective of graphic art, Hollar Gallery, Prague
- 2002 Figural tapestries, graphics, Letohrádek Ostrov nad Ohří, (curator Vachudová B.)
- 2002 Prints and one tapestry, Magna Gallery, Ostrava, (curator Šmolka J.)
- 2004 prints, monotypes, drawings and 3 tapestries from the 1960s, Leoš Janáček Cultural House, Havířov, (curator Hartmann A.)
- 2005 prints, tapestries, small hall of the Trade Fair Palace, National Gallery Prague, (with Jenny Hladíková)
- 2007 paintings, Magna Gallery, Ostrava, (curator Šmolka J.)
- 2009 Transformations and Returns, graphic work 1946–2008, Hollar Gallery, Prague

==== Collective (selection) ====
- 1965–1979 2nd, 3rd, 4th, 8th, 9th Biennale Internationale de la Tapiserie, Lausanne
- 1967 50 years of SČUG Hollar, National Gallery Prague
- 1968 Prints, author's woven tapestry, Heilbronn, Kunstverein
- 1969 Incisori Cecoslovacci, Galleria I Portici, Cremona, Bologna
- 1970 Künstlergruppe Hollar, Galerie Metternich, Koblenz
- 1971 Great Exhibition of the Czech Graphic Artists Association Hollar, Mánes, Prague
- 1995 Members' Exhibition of the Czech Graphic Artists Association Hollar, Mánes, Prague
- 1995 Czech Graphic Art, Bratislava City Gallery, Bratislava
- 2000 Alfa 2000 Omega, National House in Smichov, Prague
- 2000 Art Textile Contemporain - Collection de l'Association Pierre Pauli, Lausanne
- 2001 International Millennial Contemporary Exhibition, Szépmüvészeti museum, Budapest
- 2002 Omago alla collezione P. et M. Magnenat, Como
- 2002 Half a Century of Changes in Czech Modern Graphic Art, [Mánes, Prague
- 2003-4 Umělecká beseda 1863–2004, Prague City Gallery
- 2007 Tribute to Václav Hollar, Clam-Gallas Palace

== Sources ==
=== Author catalogues ===
- Tomeš J.M.: Jan Hladík, Graphics, Hollar Gallery, Prague 1970
- Tučná Dagmar: Jan Hladík, Figural Tapestries, Museum of Decorative Arts in Prague 1978
- Topol Josef, Hartmann Antonín: Jan Hladík, Tapestry / Graphic Art, Imperial Stables, Prague Castle 1995
- Hartmann Antonín: Jan Hladík, Tapestry, Graphic Art, House of Arts in Opava 2001
- Jan Hladík, Retrospective of Graphic Art, Hollar Gallery, Prague 2002
- Jan Hladík, Graphics, drawings and 3 tapestries (1961–1990), 2004, Vilém Wünsche's Gallery, Havířov
- Fišer Marcel, Hladík Jan: Jan Hladík, Magna Gallery, Ostrava 2007
- Janáková Knoblochová J: Jan Hladík: Changes and Returns, Graphic Work 1946–2008, Hollar Gallery, Prague 2009

=== General sources ===
- Kybalová Ludmila, Czechoslovak Tapestry Art, Prague 1963
- Jobé J.(ed.), Le Grand Livre de la Tapisserie, encyclopedia, 280 p., Lausanne-Paris 1965
- Coffinet J., Arachné ou l'art de la tapisserie, Geneva 1971
- Kuenzi A., La nouvelle tapisserie, encyclopedia, 303 pp., Geneva1973
- Jarry M., La tapisserie-Art du XXéme siécle, Fribourg 1974
- Thomson F.P., Tapestry, Mirror of History, London, 1980 ISBN 978-0-517-53415-1
- Mráz B., Mrázová M., Contemporary Tapestry, Prague 1980
- Magnenat P., Billeter E., Art textile contemporain, Lausanne 1983 ISBN 3-7165-1212-5
- Thomas M, Mainguy Ch, Pommier S, Textile art, Skira, Geneva 1985 ISBN 978-0-297-78772-3
- Dvořák F. et al., SČUG Hollar 1917–1992 - Contemporary graphics, Prague 1992
- Gavillet A, Art Textile Contemporain/Contemporary Textile Art: Collection of the Pierre Pauli Association, Benteli Verlag; 1st edition, 2000 ISBN 3-7165-1212-5
- Mayer Thurman C.C.,Advocates for Art: Polish and Czech Fiber Artists from the Anne and Jacques Baruch Collection, 2010, 114 col. photos, ISBN 1-930230-39-7
