= Staré Hrady =

- Municipality
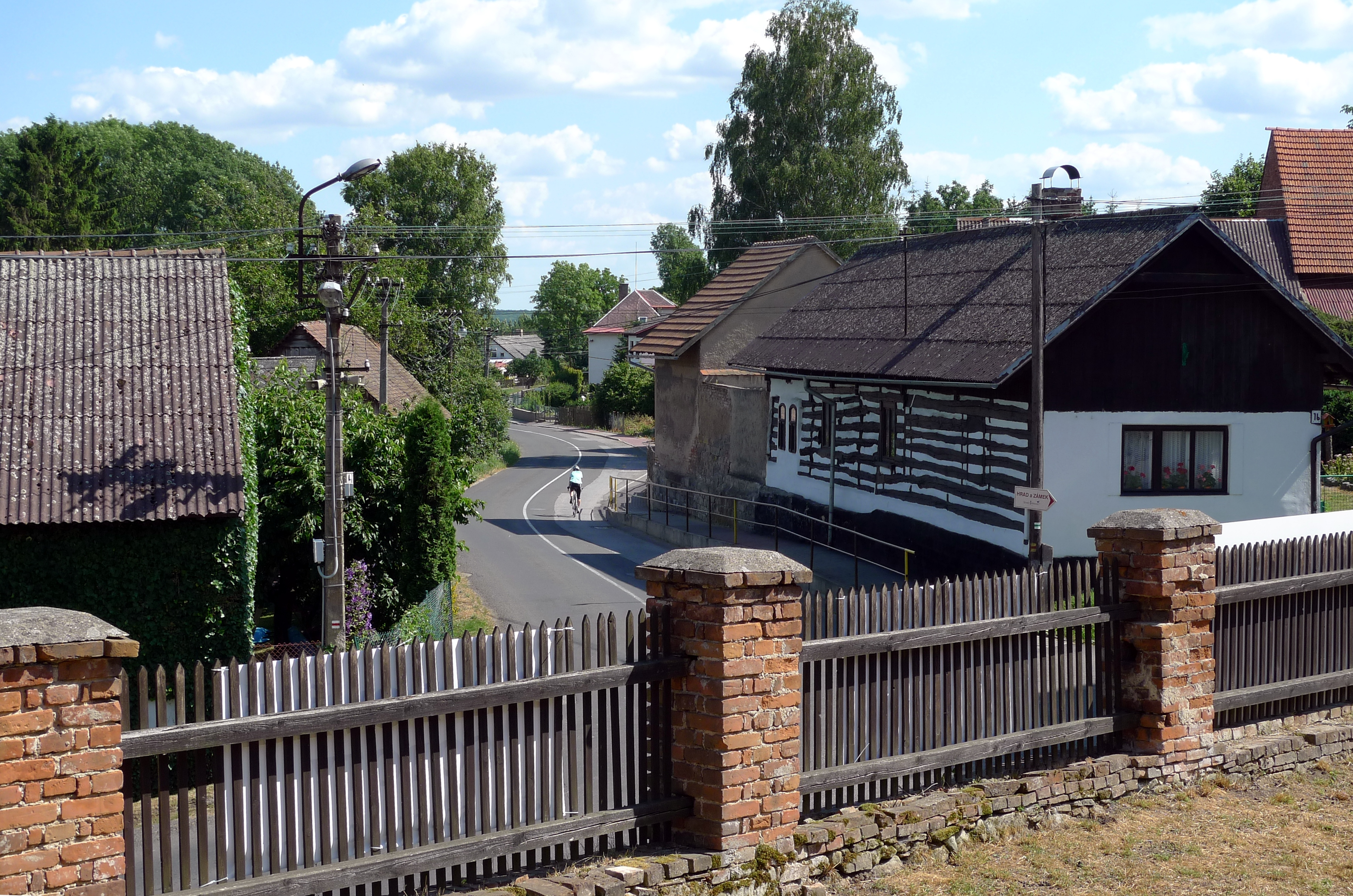
- Main street

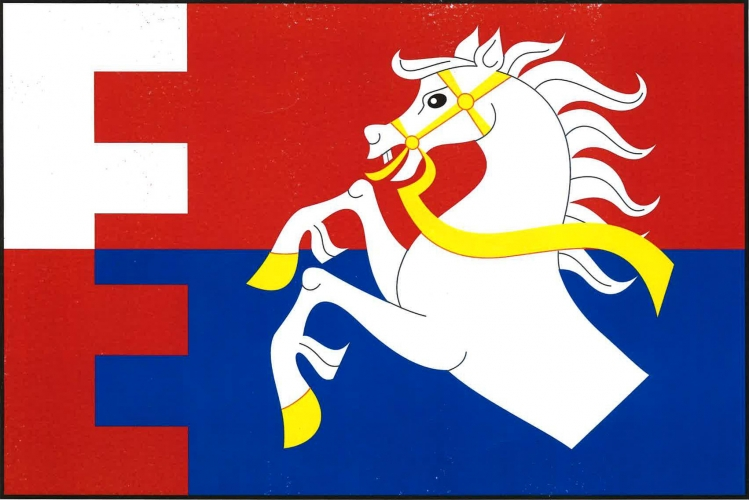
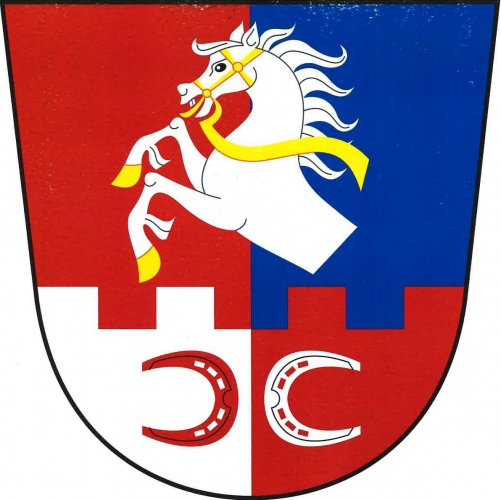
- Flag Coat of arms

- Location in the Czech Republic
- Coordinates: 50°23′10″N 15°12′47″E
- Country: Czech Republic
- Region: Hradec Králové
- District: Jičín
- First mentioned: 1340

Area
  - Total: 3.85 km^{2} (1.49 sq mi)
- Elevation: 240 m (790 ft)

Population (2026-01-01)
  - Total: 192
  - Density: 49.9/km^{2} (129/sq mi)
- Time zone: UTC+1 (CET)
  - Summer (DST): UTC+2 (CEST)
- Postal code: 507 23
- Website: www.stare-hrady.cz

Staré Hrady is a municipality and village in Jičín District in the Hradec Králové Region of the Czech Republic. It has about 200 inhabitants.

== Demographics ==
Historical population
Year	Pop.	±%
1869	382	—
1880	422	+10.5%
1890	459	+8.8%
1900	432	−5.9%
1910	392	−9.3%
1921	403	+2.8%
1930	310	−23.1%
1950	286	−7.7%
1961	265	−7.3%
1970	243	−8.3%
1980	192	−21.0%
1991	153	−20.3%
2001	172	+12.4%
2011	191	+11.0%
2021	186	−2.6%
Source: Censuses

== Sights ==
Staré Hrady is known for the Staré Hrady Castle. It belongs to the most visited tourist destinations in the region. A Gothic fortress named Stará was first documented in 1340. It was rebuilt into the Renaissance castle in 1573. In 2007, it was purchased by a private owner who reconstructed the castle and opened it to the public.
