= List of museums in Prague =

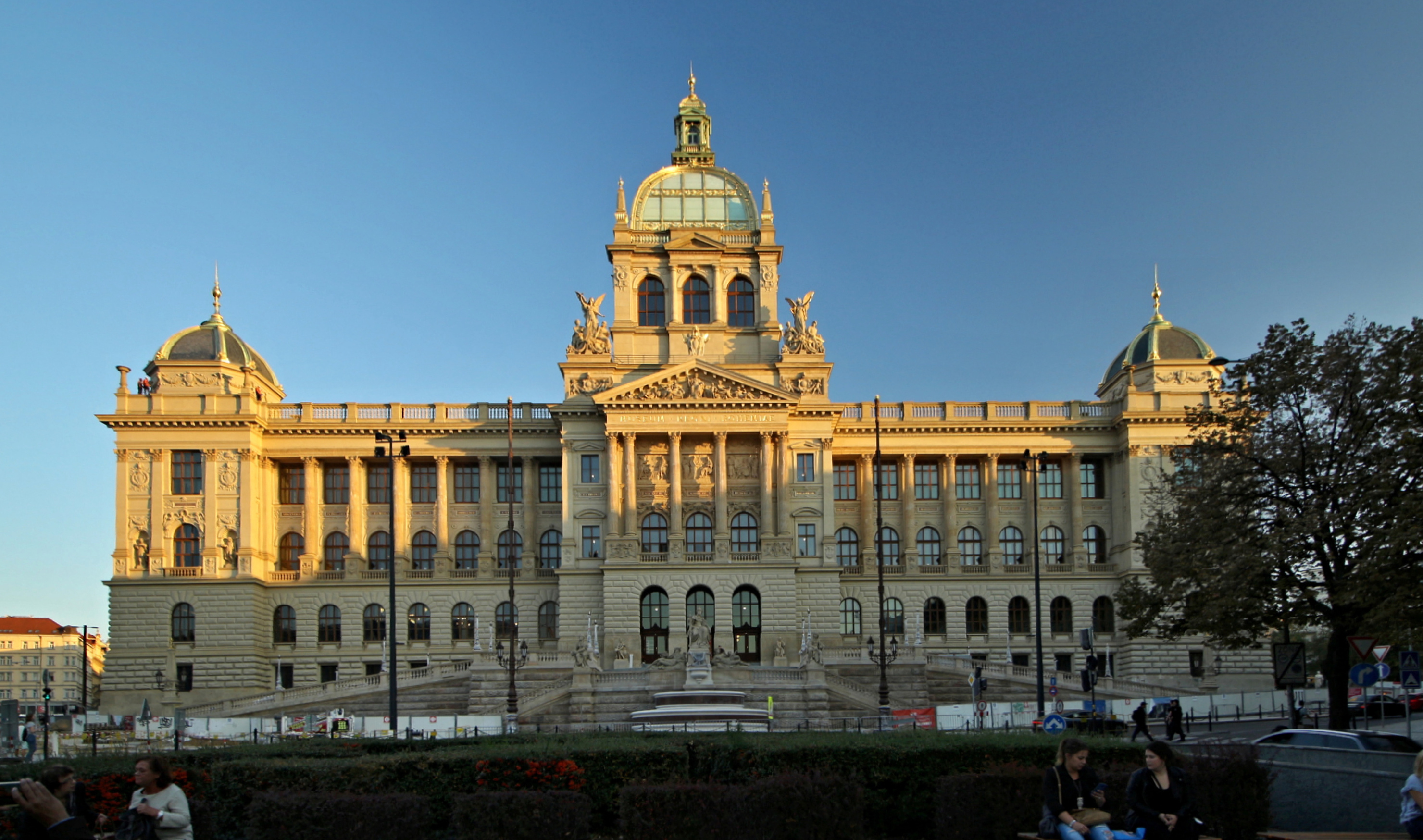
Main building of the National Museum in Prague

This is an ongoing list of museus in Prague.

== Museum institutions ==
=== Art museums and galleries ===
- National Gallery Prague
  - Convent of Saint Agnes
  - Sternberg Palace
  - Salm Palace
  - Kinský Palace
  - Trade Fair Palace
  - Schwarzenberg Palace
  - Waldstein Riding School
- Galerie Rudolfinum
- Museum of Decorative Arts in Prague
- Galerie Cesty ke světlu
- House of the Black Madonna
- Josef Sudek Gallery
- Mucha Museum (Savarin Palace)
- Mucha Museum (Kounice Palace)
- Museum Kampa
- The Václav Špála Gallery
- DOX Centre for Contemporary Art
- Kunsthalle Praha

=== Cultural and historical museums ===
- City of Prague Museum
- National Museum
  - Lapidarium, Prague
  - Náprstek Museum
  - Ethnographic Museum of the National Museum
  - Czech Museum of Music
- Jewish Museum in Prague
  - Ceremonial Hall of the Prague Jewish Burial Society
  - Maisel Synagogue
  - Pinkas Synagogue
- Ss. Cyril and Methodius Cathedral (The National Memorial to the Heroes of the Heydrich Terror)
- Pedagogical museum of J. A. Comenius in Prague
- Prague Postal Museum
- Museum of Czech Literature
- National Monument at Vítkov

=== Memorial museums and commemorative collections ===
- Antonín Dvořák Museum
- Bedřich Smetana Museum
- Bertramka: Mozart Museum

=== Technical and natural-history museums ===
- National Technical Museum (Prague)
  - Kepler Museum
- Prague Aviation Museum, Kbely
- Czech Police Museum
- The Army Museum Žižkov
- National Museum of Agriculture
- Prague Public Transport Museum

== Tourist attractions ==
- Museum of Communism
- Sex Machines Museum
- Franz Kafka Museum

== See also ==
- List of museums in the Czech Republic
