= National Gallery Prague =

Art gallery in Prague, Czech Republic

- Národní galerie Praha

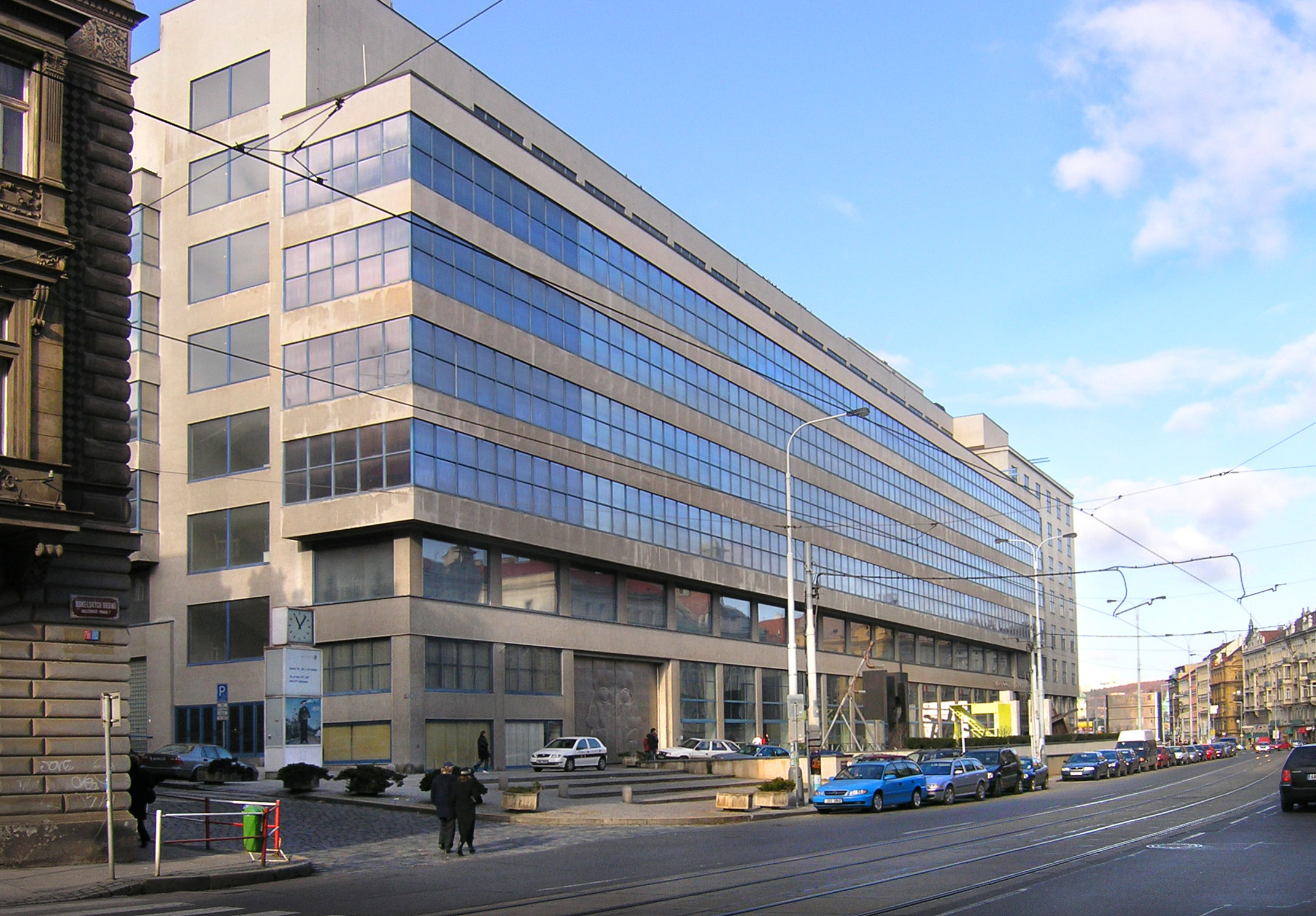
- Veletržní palác (the Trade Fair Palace) houses the National Gallery Prague
- Established: 1796; 230 years ago
- Location: Prague
- Type: Art museum
- Visitors: 711,928 (2018)
- Director: Olga Kotková (interim)
- Website: ngprague.cz

The National Gallery Prague (Czech: Národní galerie Praha, NGP), formerly the National Gallery in Prague (Národní galerie v Praze), is a state-owned art gallery in Prague, which manages the largest collection of art in the Czech Republic and presents masterpieces of Czech and international fine art in permanent and temporary exhibitions. The collections of the gallery are not housed in a single building, but are presented in a number of historic structures within the city of Prague, as well as other places. The largest of the gallery sites is the Trade Fair Palace, which houses the National Gallery's collection of modern art. Other important exhibition spaces are located in the Convent of St Agnes of Bohemia, the Kinský Palace, the Salm Palace, the Schwarzenberg Palace, the Sternberg Palace, and the Wallenstein Riding School. Founded in 1796, it is one of the world's oldest public art galleries and one of the largest museums in Central Europe.

== History ==
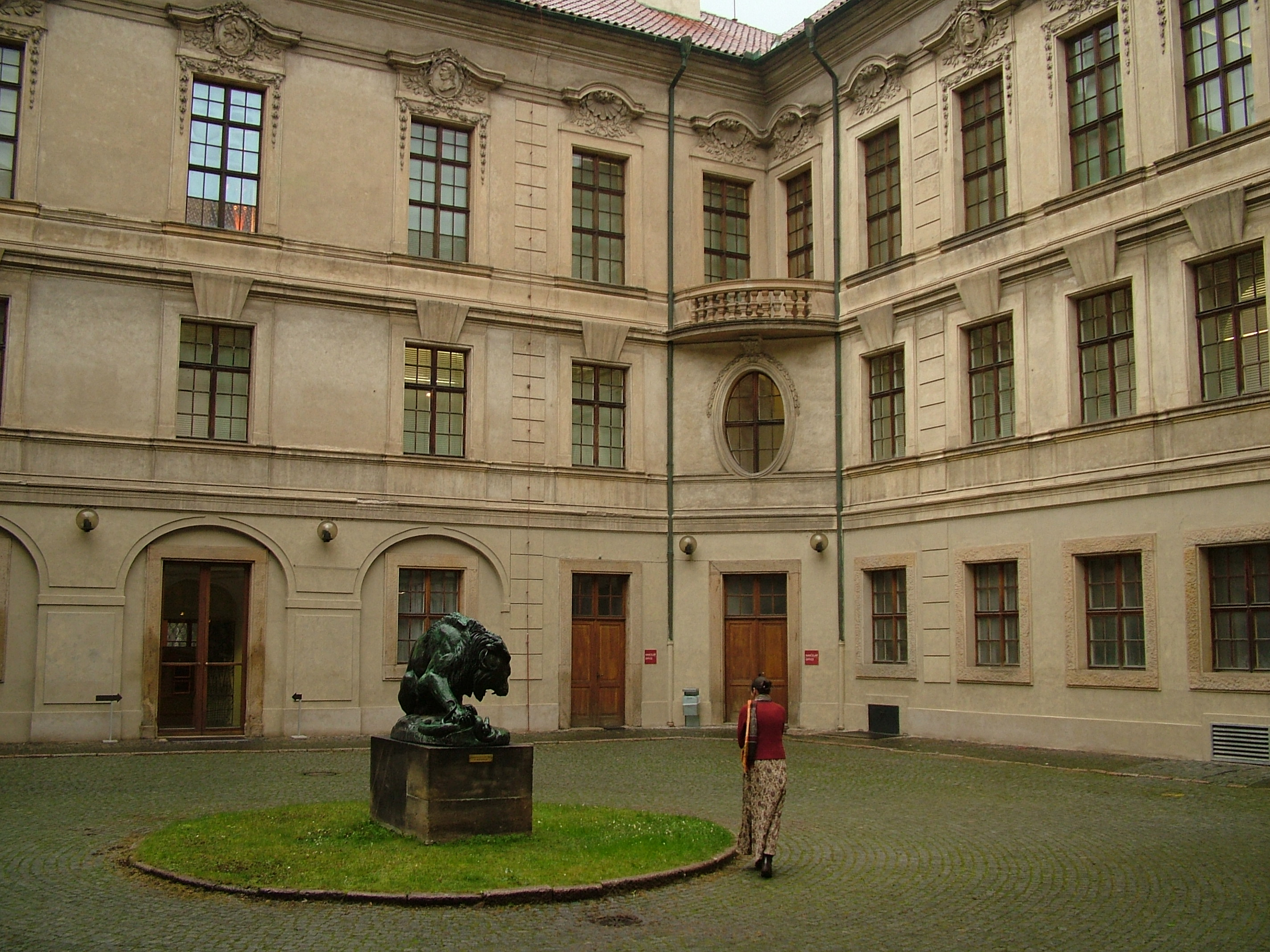
Šternberk Palace at Hradčany

The history of the National Gallery dates back to the end of the 18th century (namely February 5, 1796), when a group of prominent representatives of Bohemian patriotic aristocracy (Kolowrat, Sternberg, Nostitz) and middle-class intellectuals decided to elevate what they called the "debased artistic taste" of the local population. The institution, which received the title Society of Patriotic Friends of the Arts, established the Academy of Fine Arts and the Picture Gallery. In 1918 the Picture Gallery became a central collection of newly formed Czechoslovakia.

In 1995 new spaces dedicated to 19th- and 20th-century art were opened in the refurbished Veletržní Palác (Trade Fair Palace), itself a national monument as Prague's largest functionalist building and one of the earliest examples of that architectural style in the city (construction began in 1925).

St George's Convent (Hradčany) was formerly used to display Art of the Middle Ages in Bohemia and Central Europe, baroque art, and the 19th-century art of Bohemia.

== The collections ==
=== Old Masters ===
- Convent of St Agnes of Bohemia (Old Town) – Art of the Middle Ages in Bohemia and Central Europe
- Sternberg Palace (Hradčany) – European Art from Antiquity to the end of the Baroque period
- Schwarzenberg Palace (Hradčany) – Baroque in Bohemia

=== 19th-Century Art ===
- Salm Palace (Hradčany)

=== Modern and Contemporary Art ===
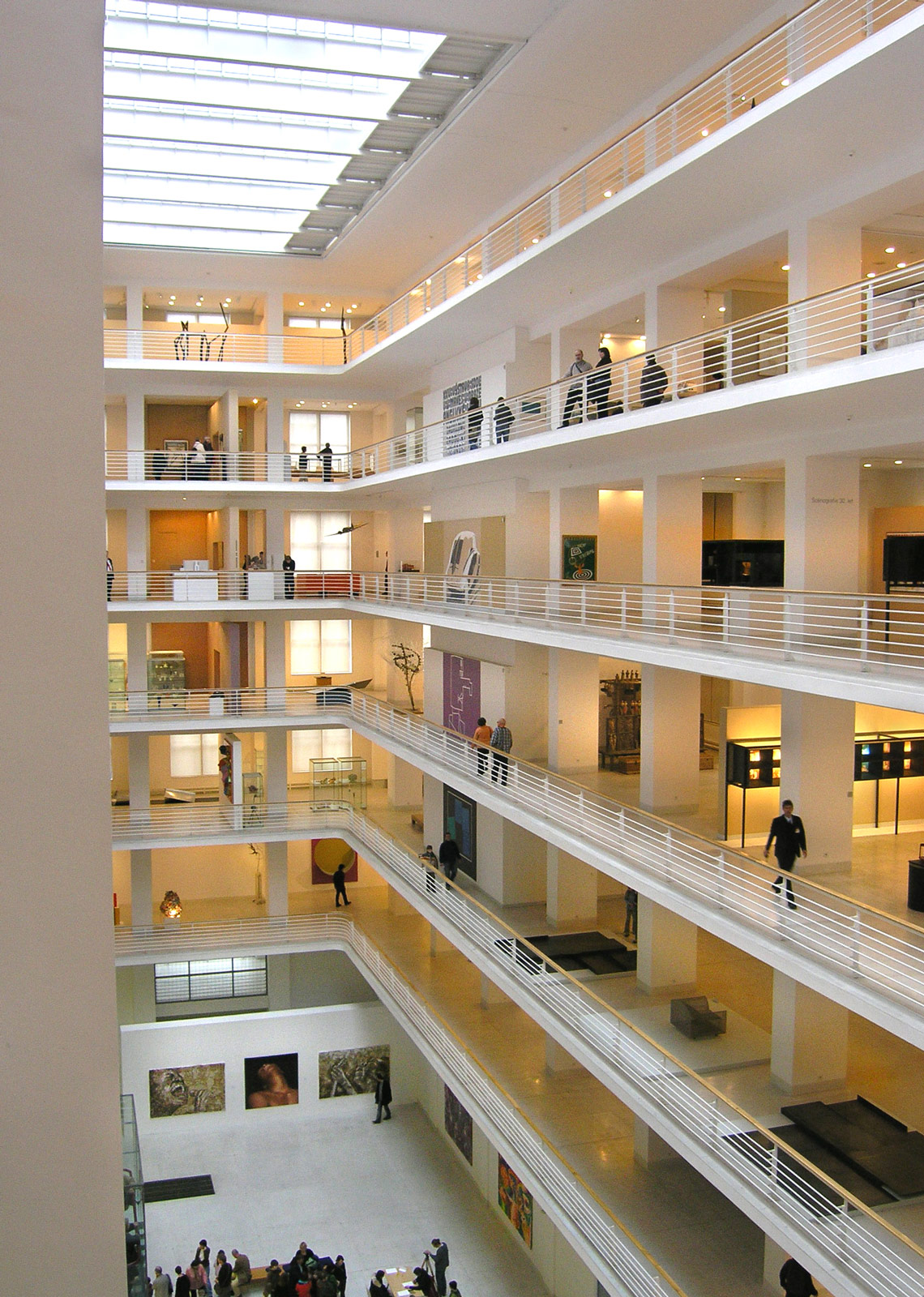
The atrium in Veletržní palác.

- Trade Fair Palace (Veletržní palác), Holešovice – 19th-, 20th-, and 21st-century art, the National Gallery's largest collection. Since 2012 Alfons Mucha's Slav Epic has been on display here.

The international collection includes numerous works by artists such as Picasso, Monet, Van Gogh, Rodin, Gauguin, Cézanne, Renoir, Schiele, Munch, Miró, and Klimt; many of these are donations from the collection of art historian Vincenc Kramář.
Picasso, who has a spacious room to himself in the gallery, has two self-portraits there, and two of his nudes in addition to more abstract work. Works by Rodin, whose exhibition in Prague in the early 20th century had a profound impact on Czech sculpture for many years afterwards, include a series of busts and full-sized figure on a variety of subjects in the gallery.
The vast collection contains a large number of Czech and Slovak paintings and sculptures, including works by Alfons Mucha, Otto Gutfreund, František Kupka, T. F. Šimon, Rudolf Fila, Vincenc Beneš, and Bohumil Kubišta. Along with the Black Madonna House and the Museum Kampa, the Trade fair palace collection is one of the most notable collections of Czech Cubism in Prague. Notable works include Don Quixote by Gutfreund, Military Funeral by Beneš, an array of paintings by Kupka, covering almost all of the styles with which he experimented.

- House of the Black Madonna (Old Town) – Czech Cubism

=== Graphics Collection ===
- Kinský Palace (Old Town)

=== Oriental Art ===
- Kinský Palace (Old Town) – Art of Asia and Art of the Ancient World

=== On display outside Prague ===
- Kinský castle Žďár nad Sázavou – Baroque Art from the Collections of the National Gallery in Prague
- Fryštát castle in Karviná – 19th-century Czech art from the Collections of the National Gallery in Prague

== Gallery ==
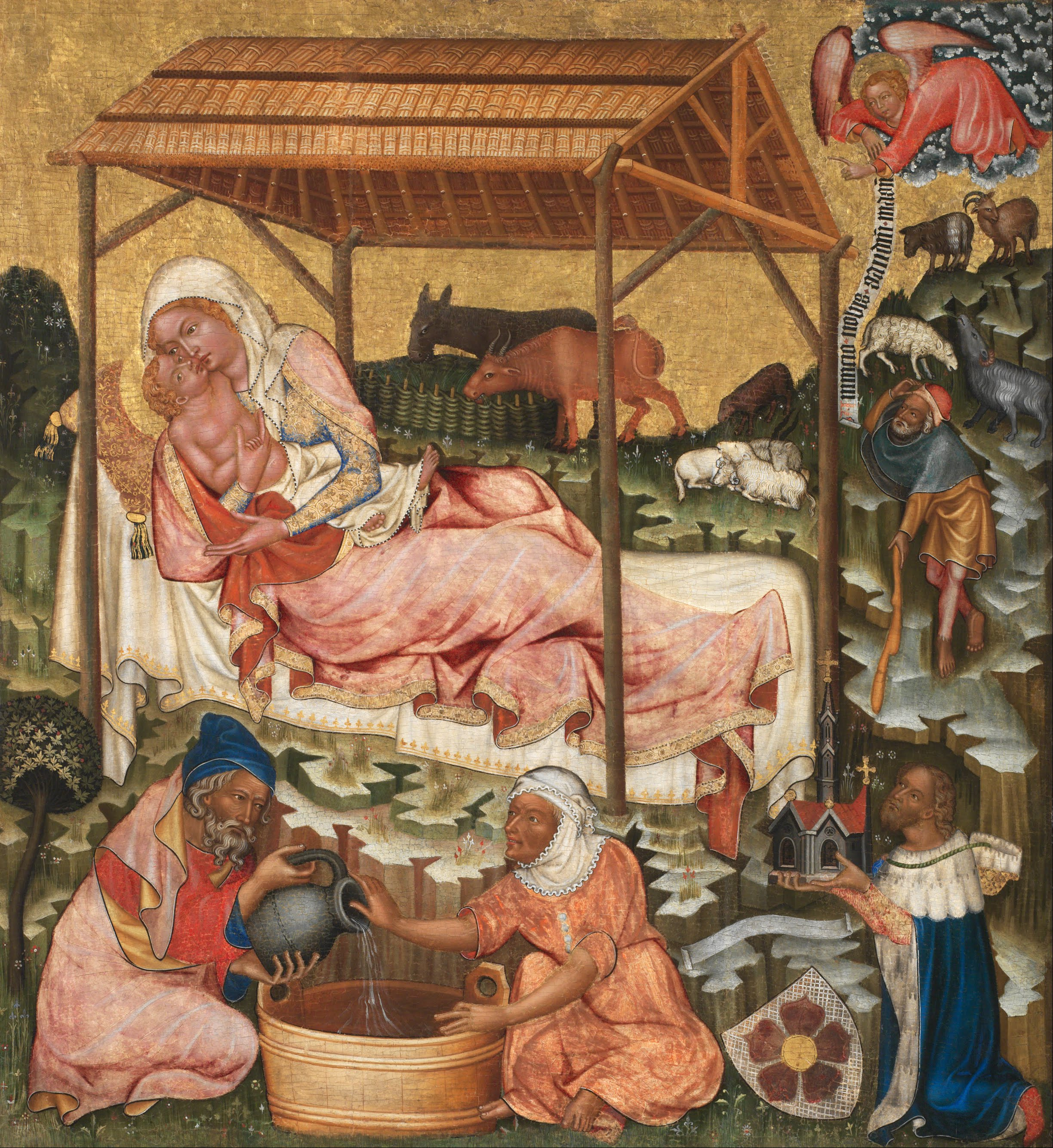
Vyšší Brod Altarpiece, 1345–1350

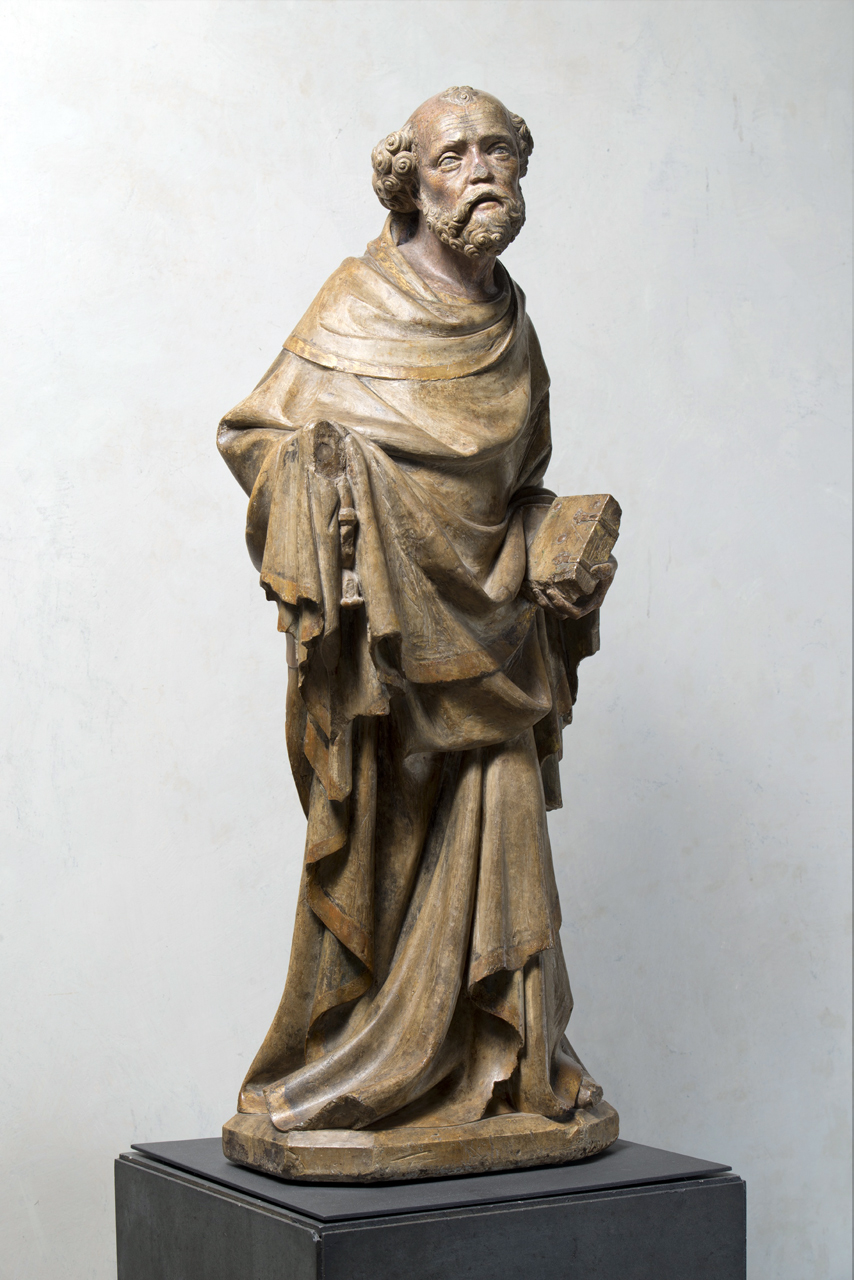
St. Peter of Slivice, around 1395

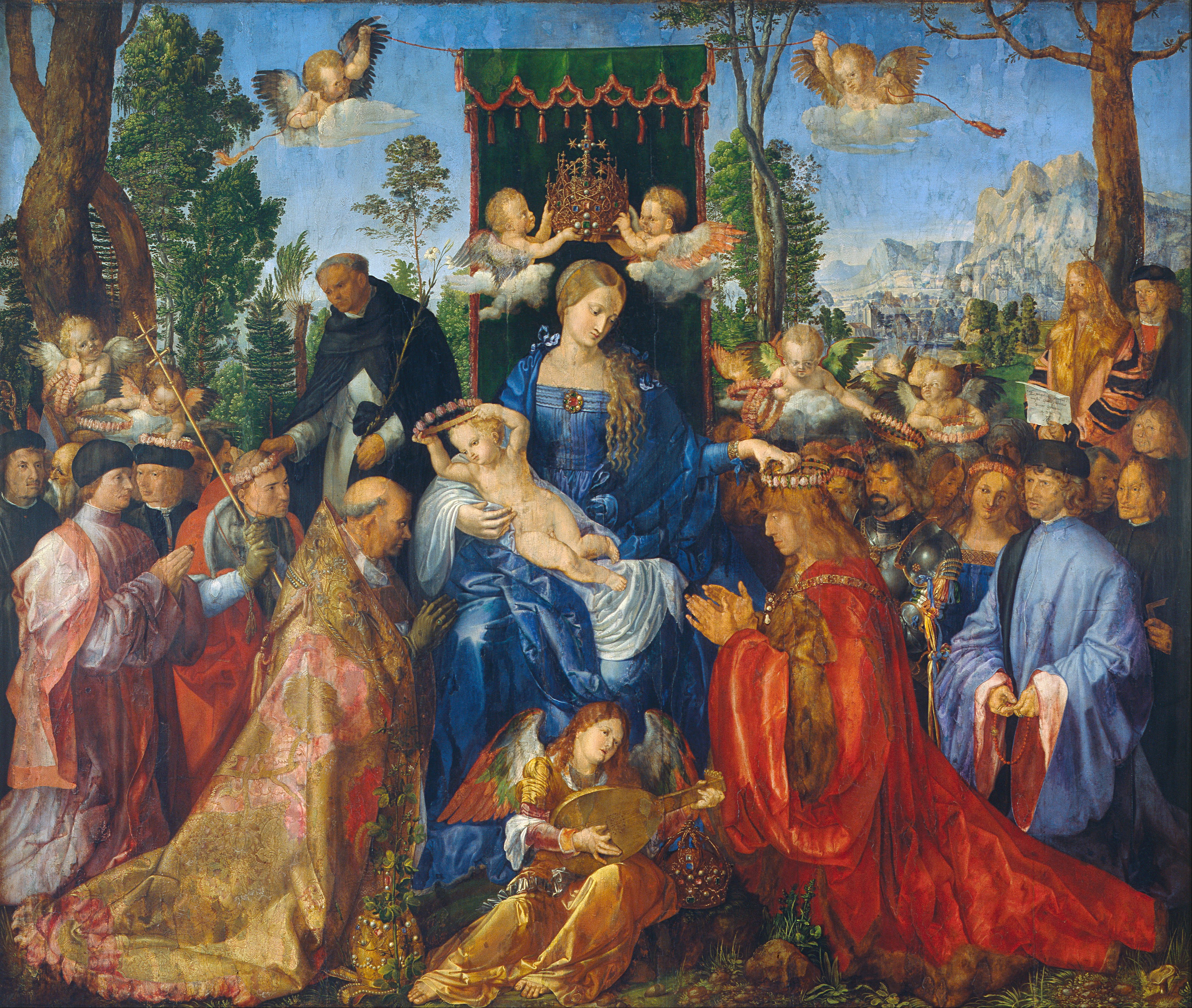
Feast of the Rosary, Albrecht Dürer, 1506

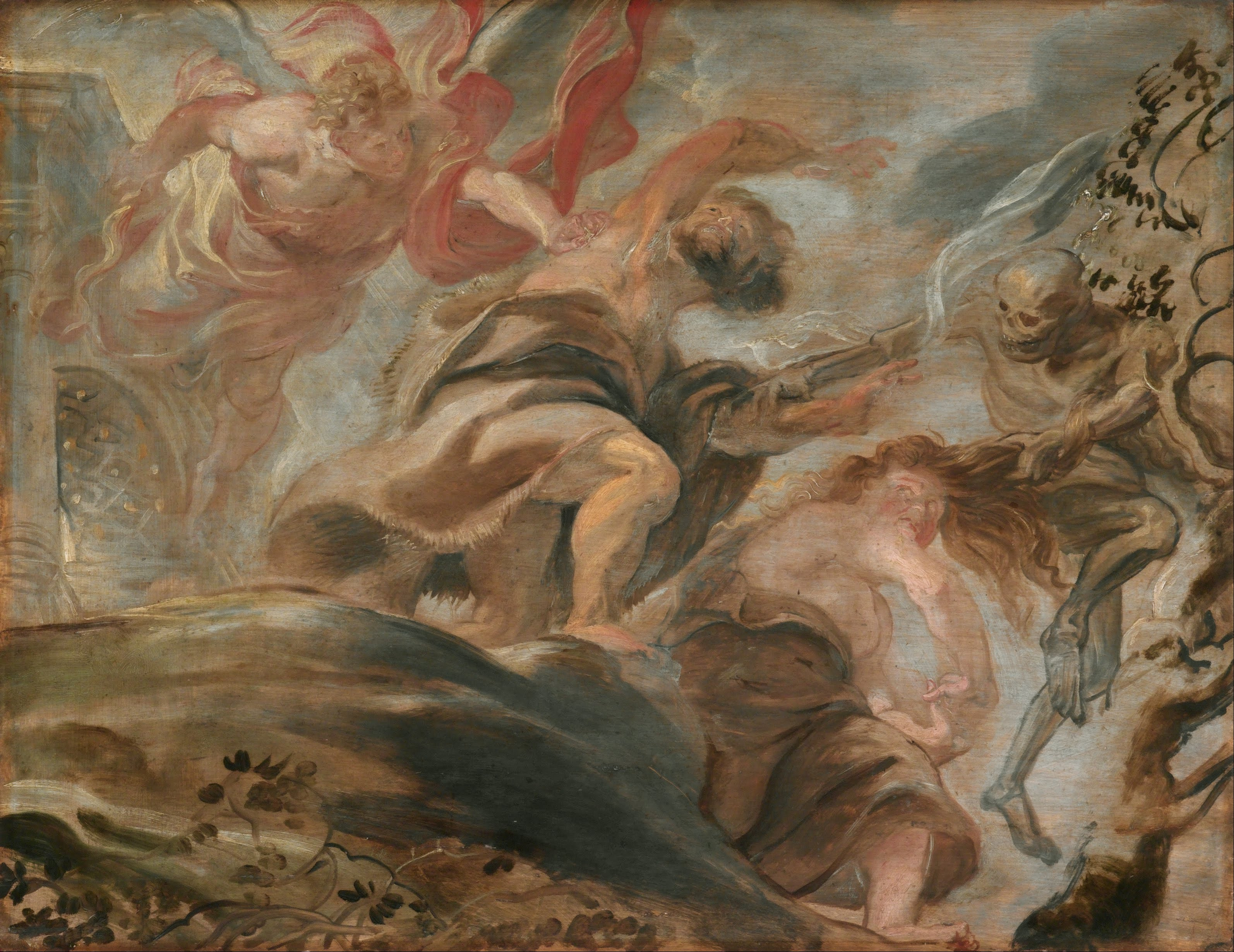
Expulsion from the Garden of Eden, Peter Paul Rubens, 1620

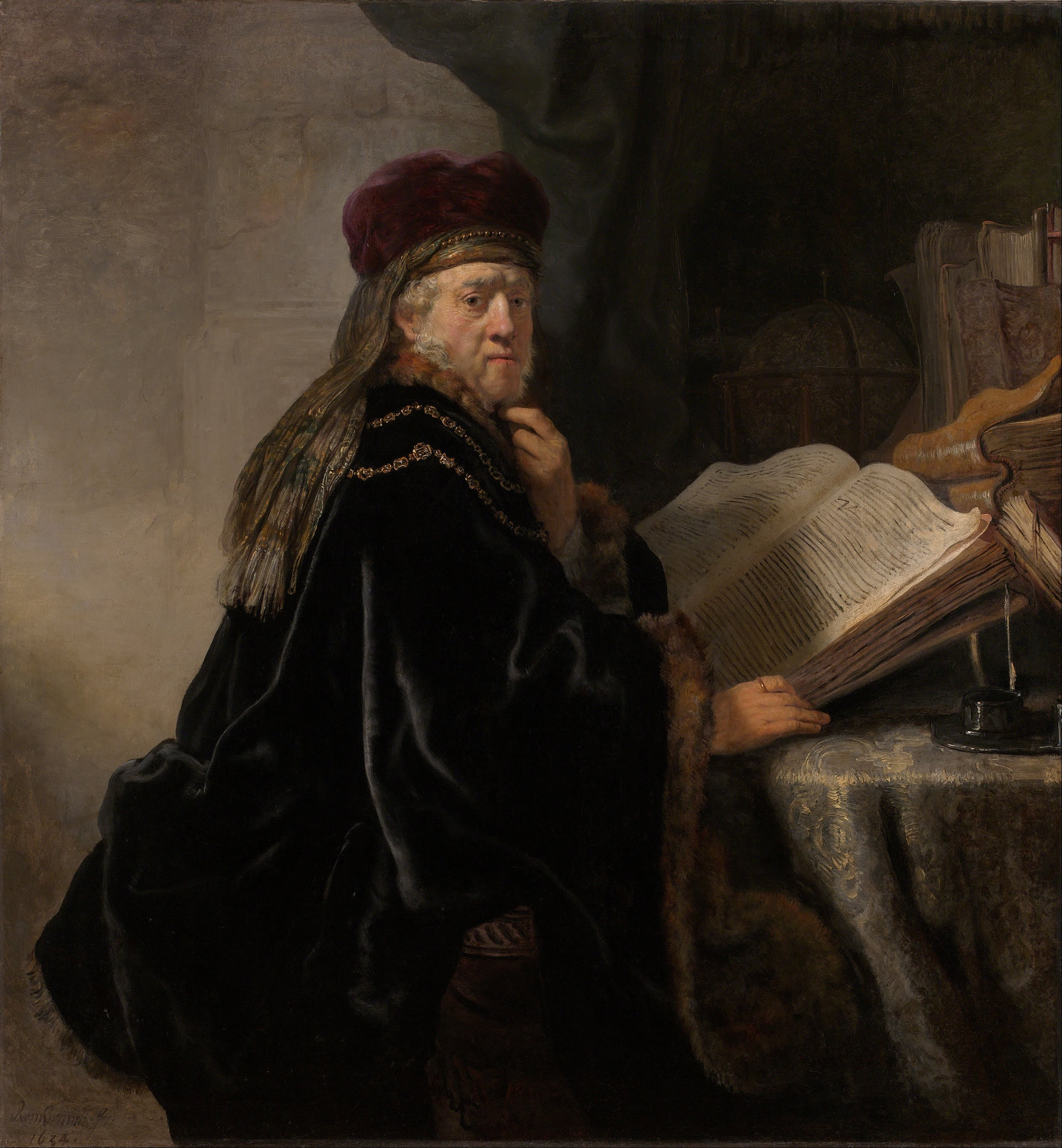
Scholar at his Study, Rembrandt van Rijn, 1634

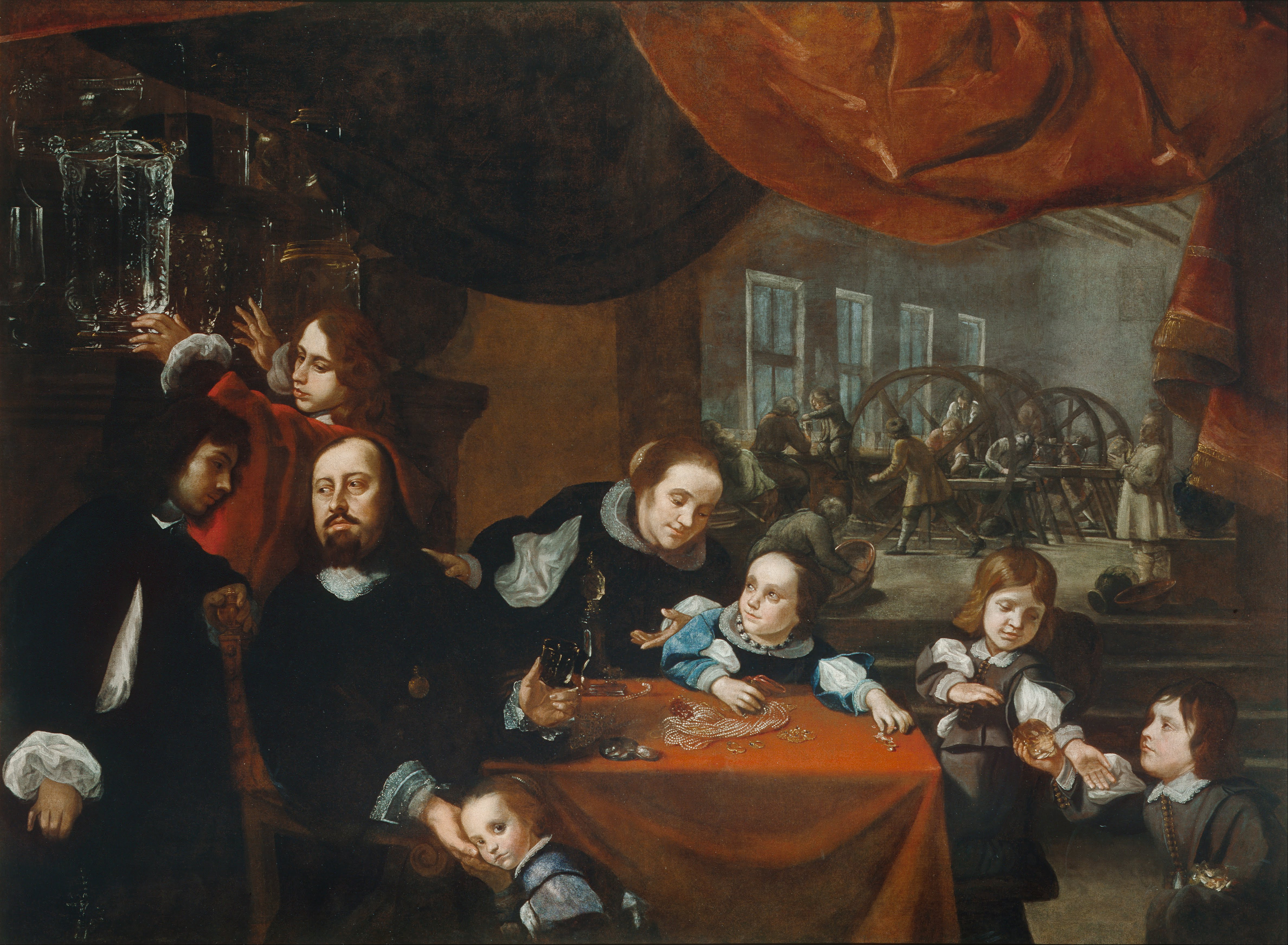
Portrait of the gem-cutter Dionysio Miseroni and his family, Karel Škréta, 1653

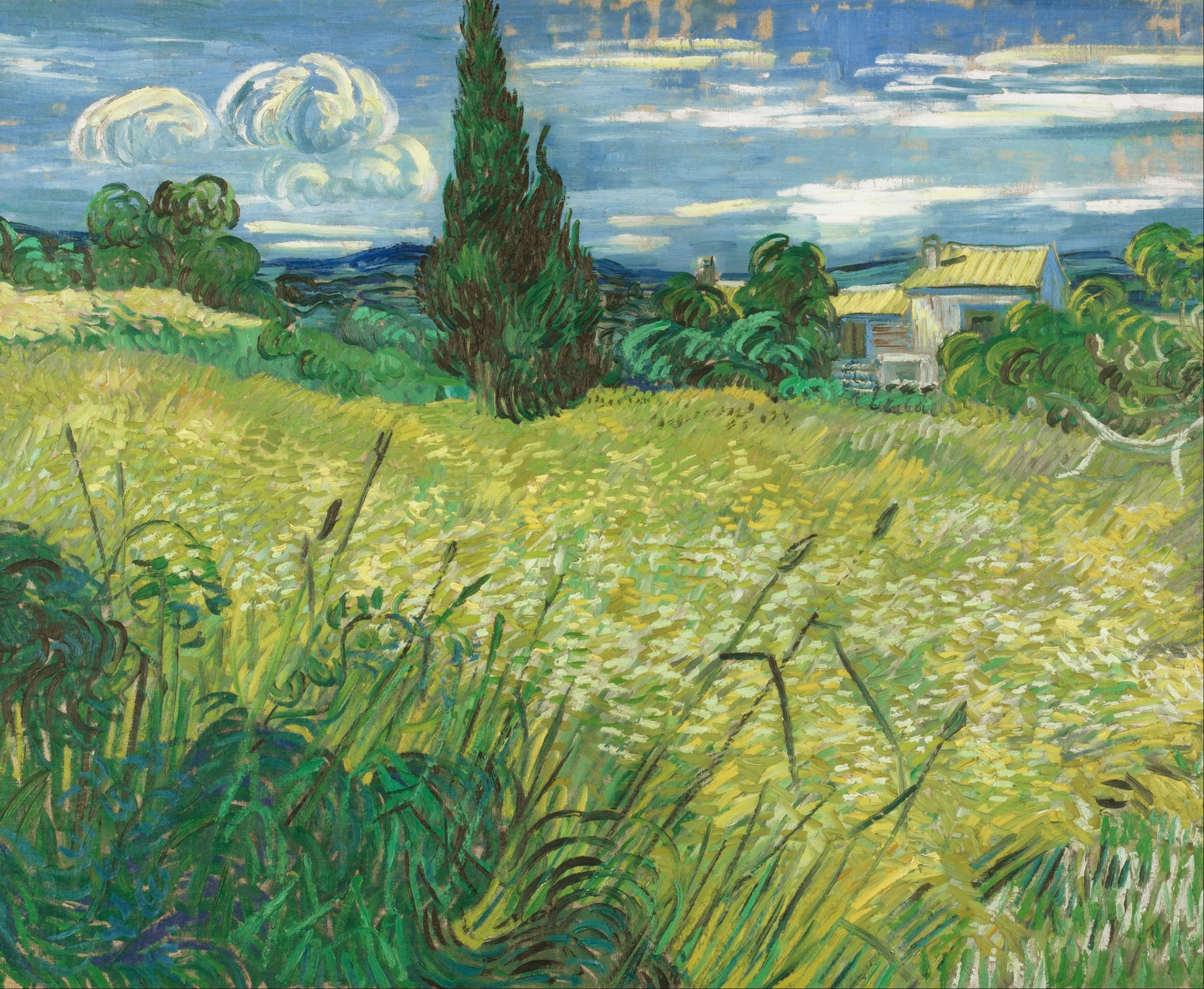
Green Wheat Field with Cypress, Vincent van Gogh, 1889

Murder in the House, Jakub Schikaneder, 1890

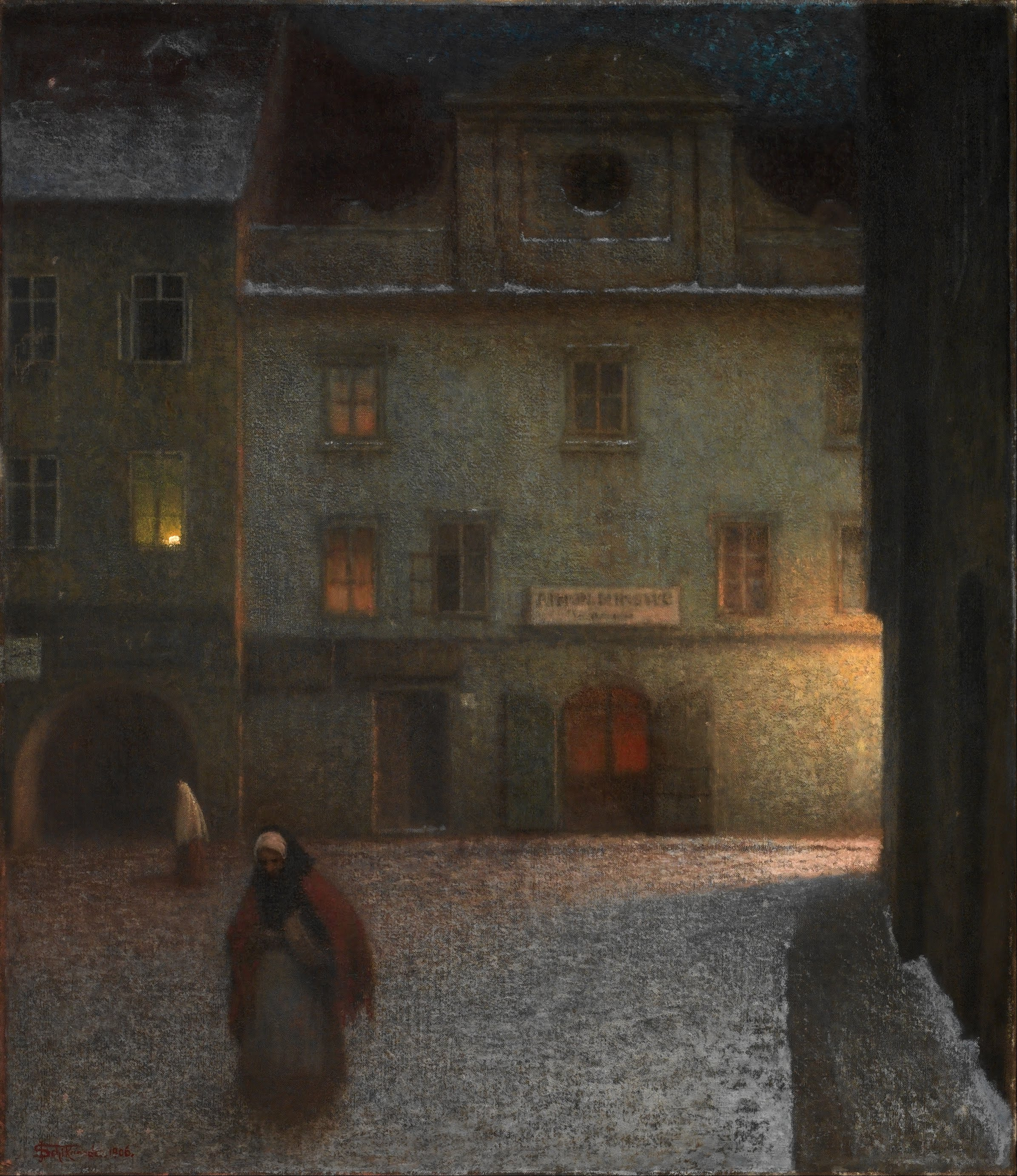
Evening Street, Jakub Schikaneder, 1906

František Kupka, Fugue in Two Colors, 1912

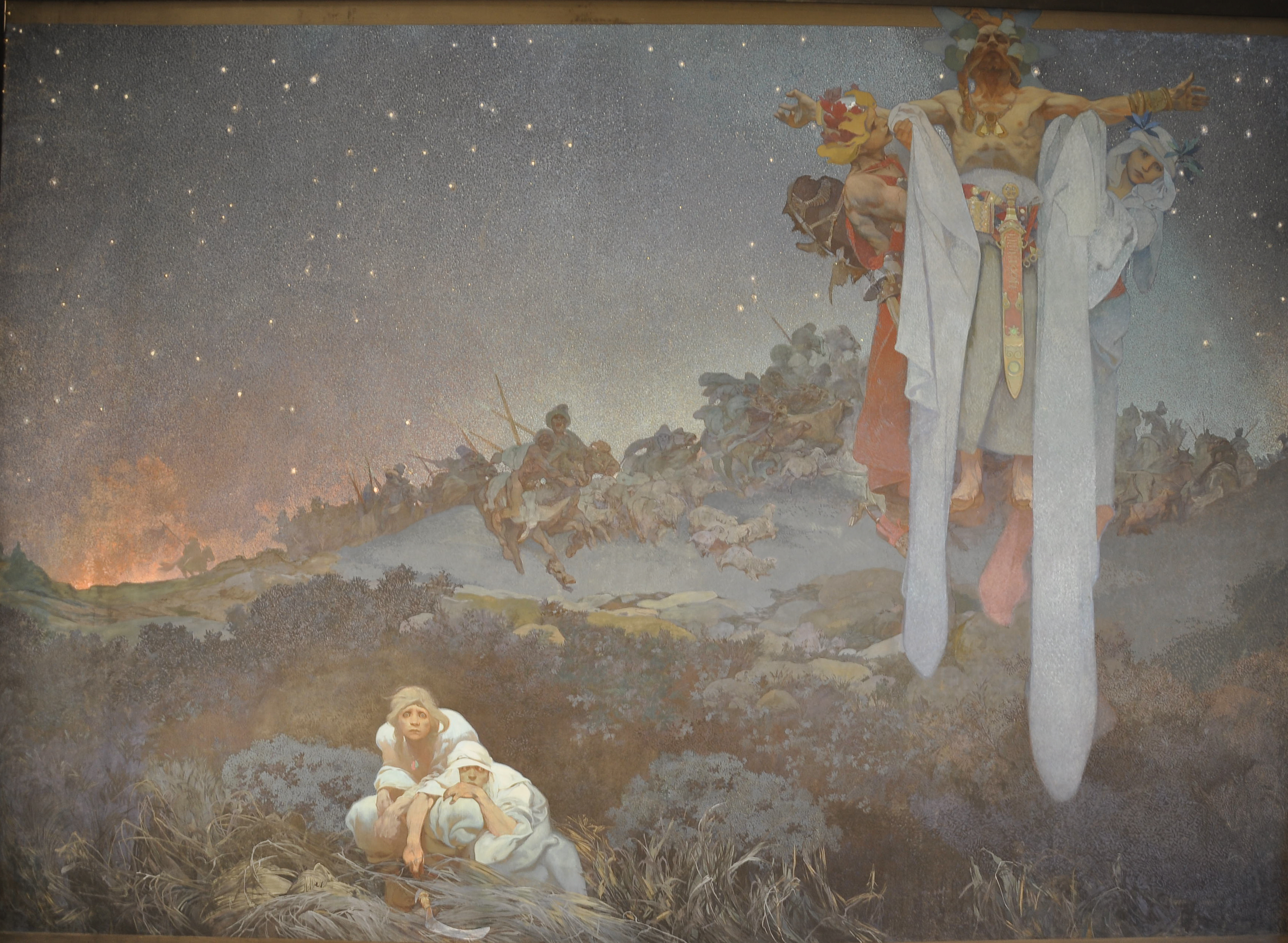
Alphonse Mucha, The Slav Epic, 1912

The Maiden, Gustav Klimt, 1913
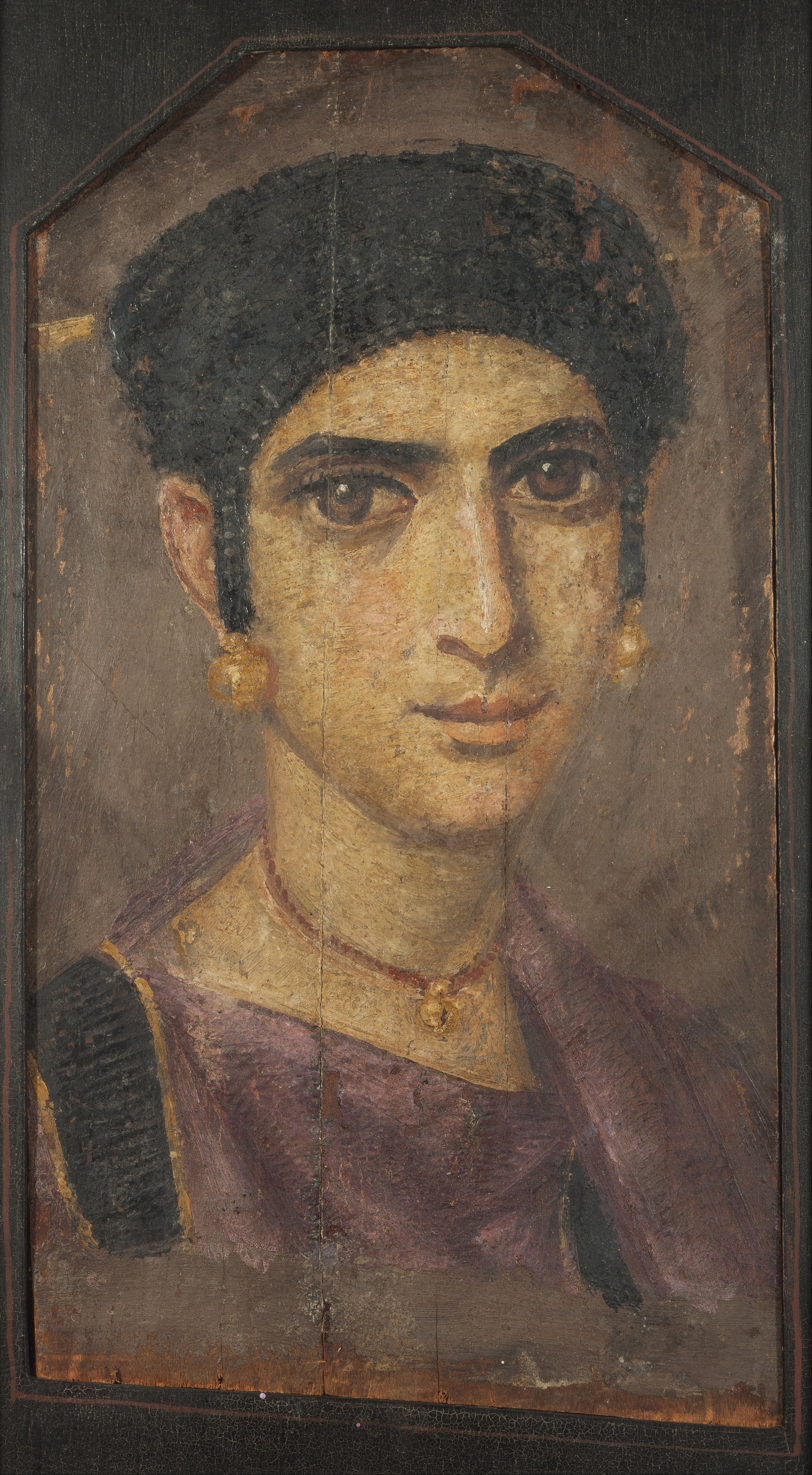
Portrait of a Young Lady from Egypt, 2nd century AD

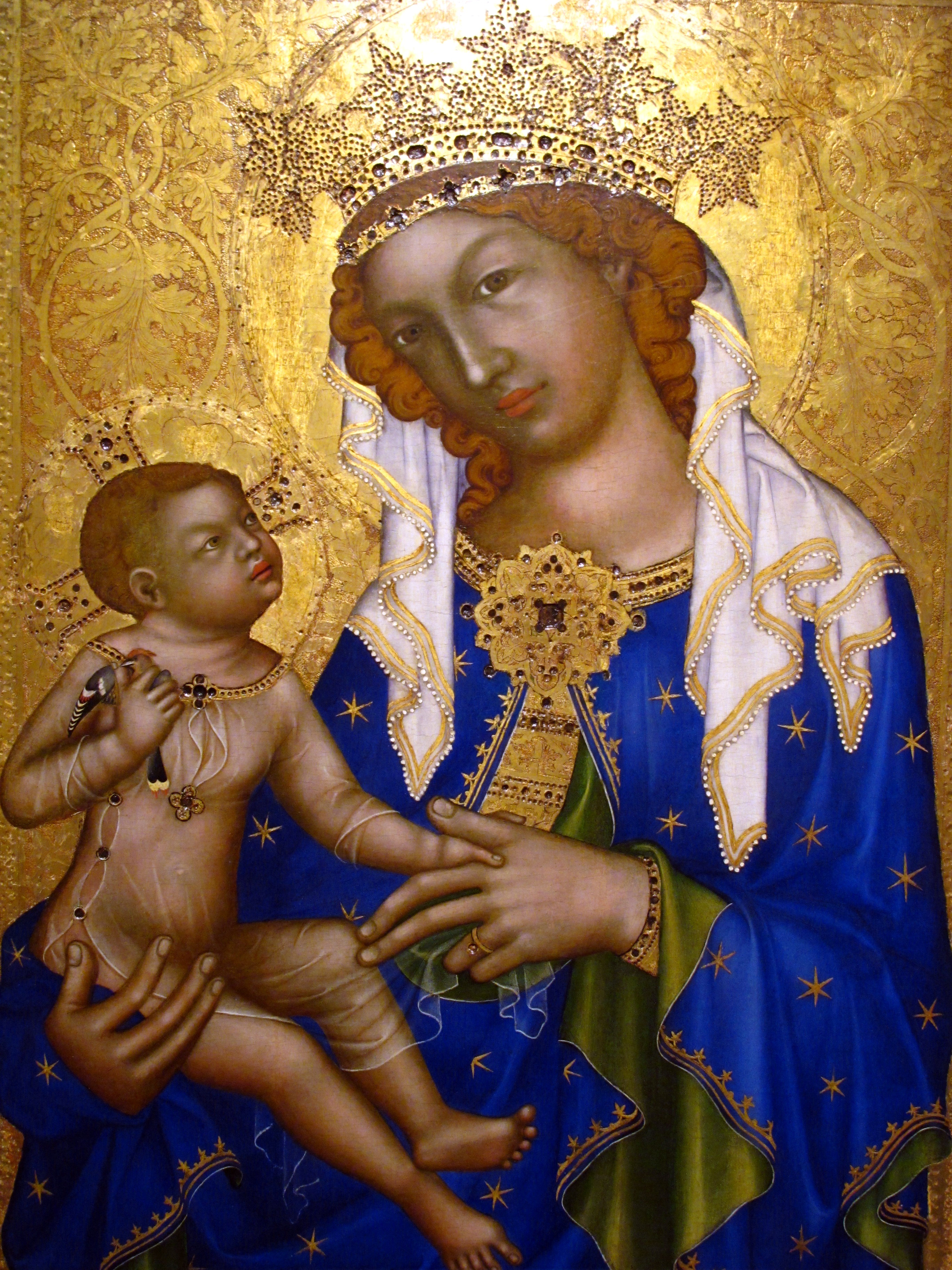
Madonna of Zbraslav, 1340–1350

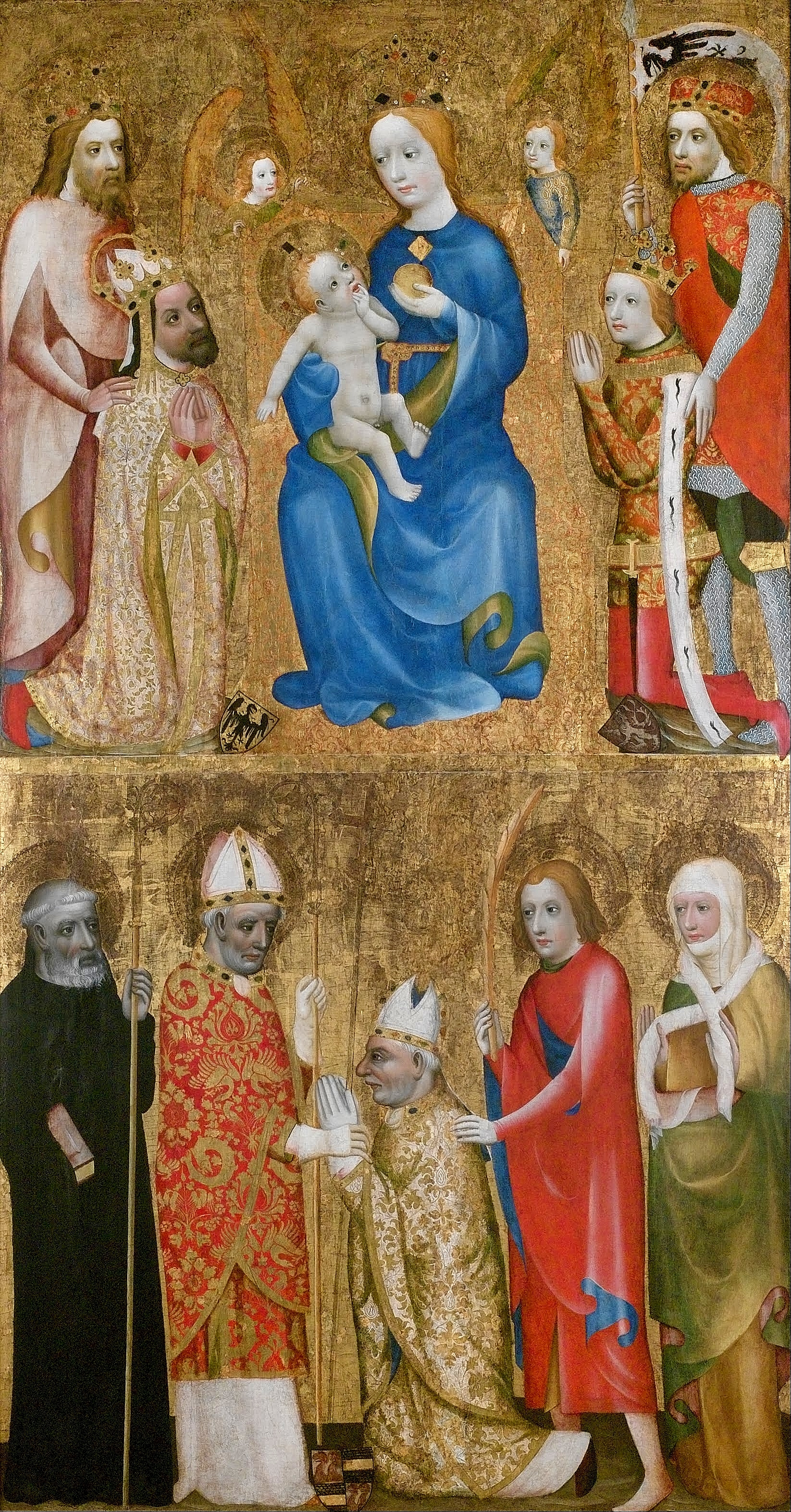
Votive Panel of Jan Očko of Vlašim, 1370

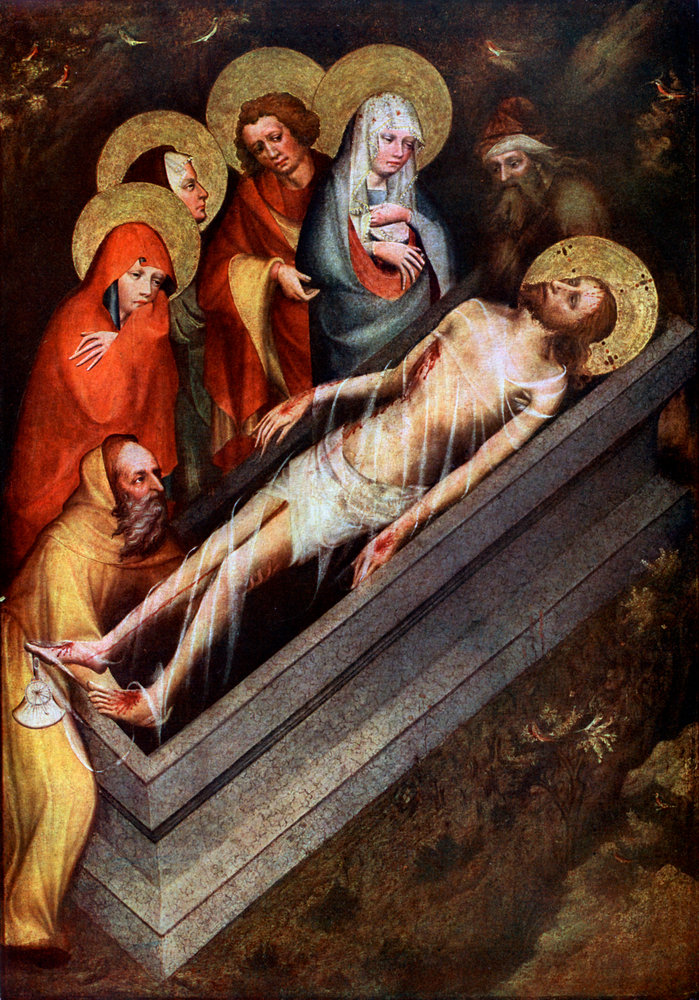
Třeboň Altarpiece, 1380–1390

Adam and Eve, Lucas Cranach the Elder, ca. 1538

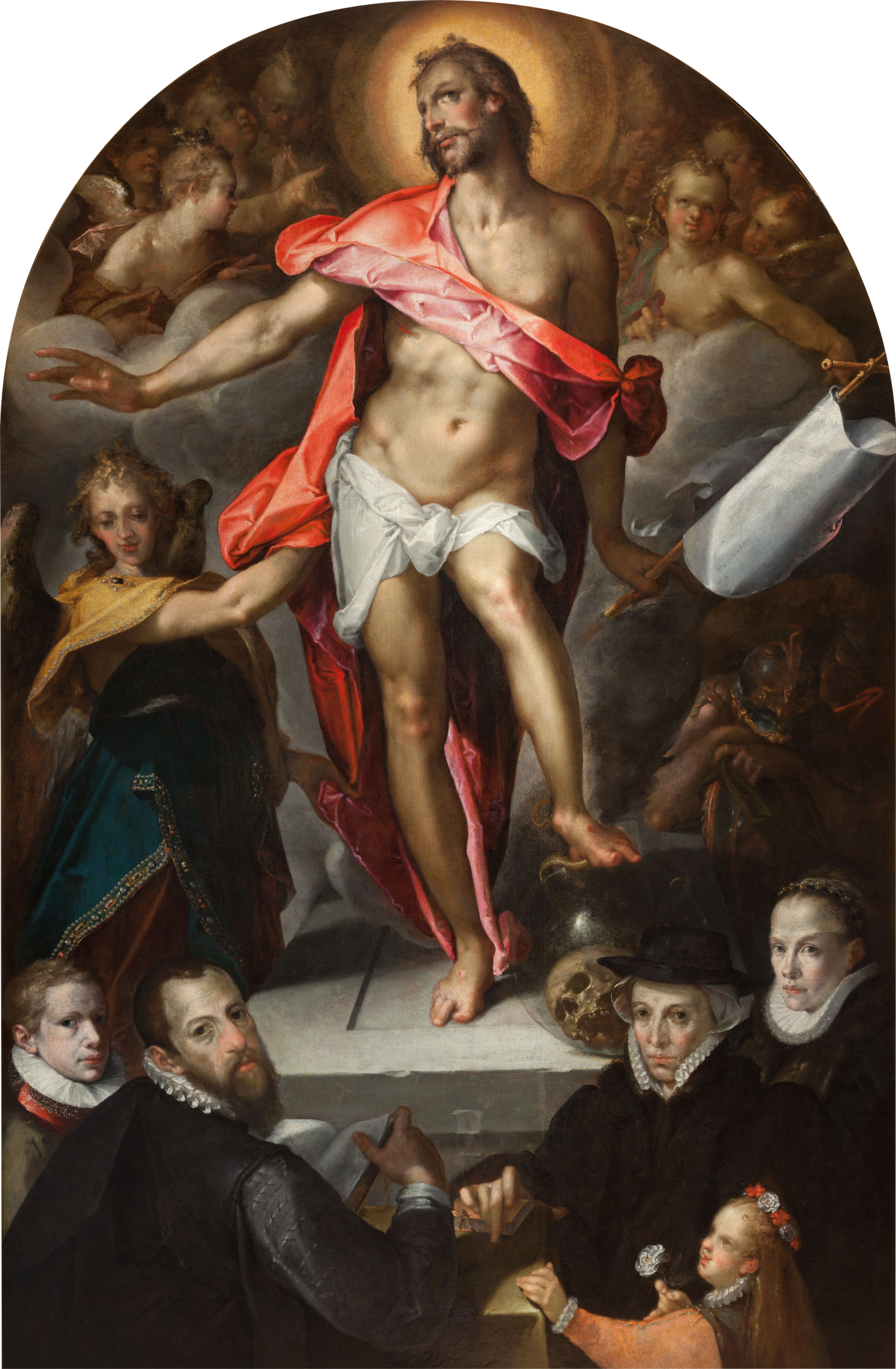
Epitaph of Goldsmith Nicolas Müller of Prague, Bartholomaeus Spranger, 1592–1593

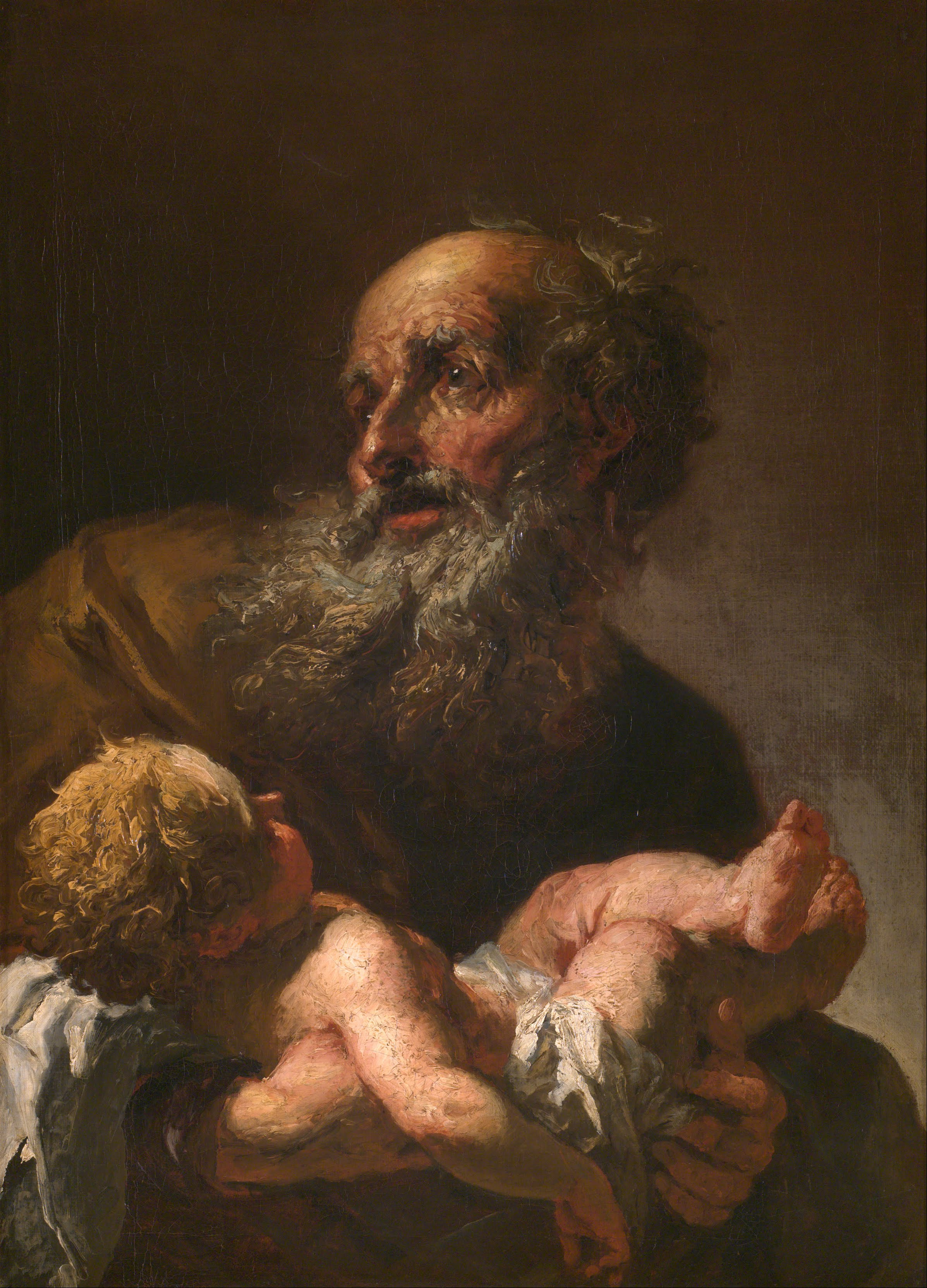
Simeon with Infant Jesus, Petr Brandl, 1725

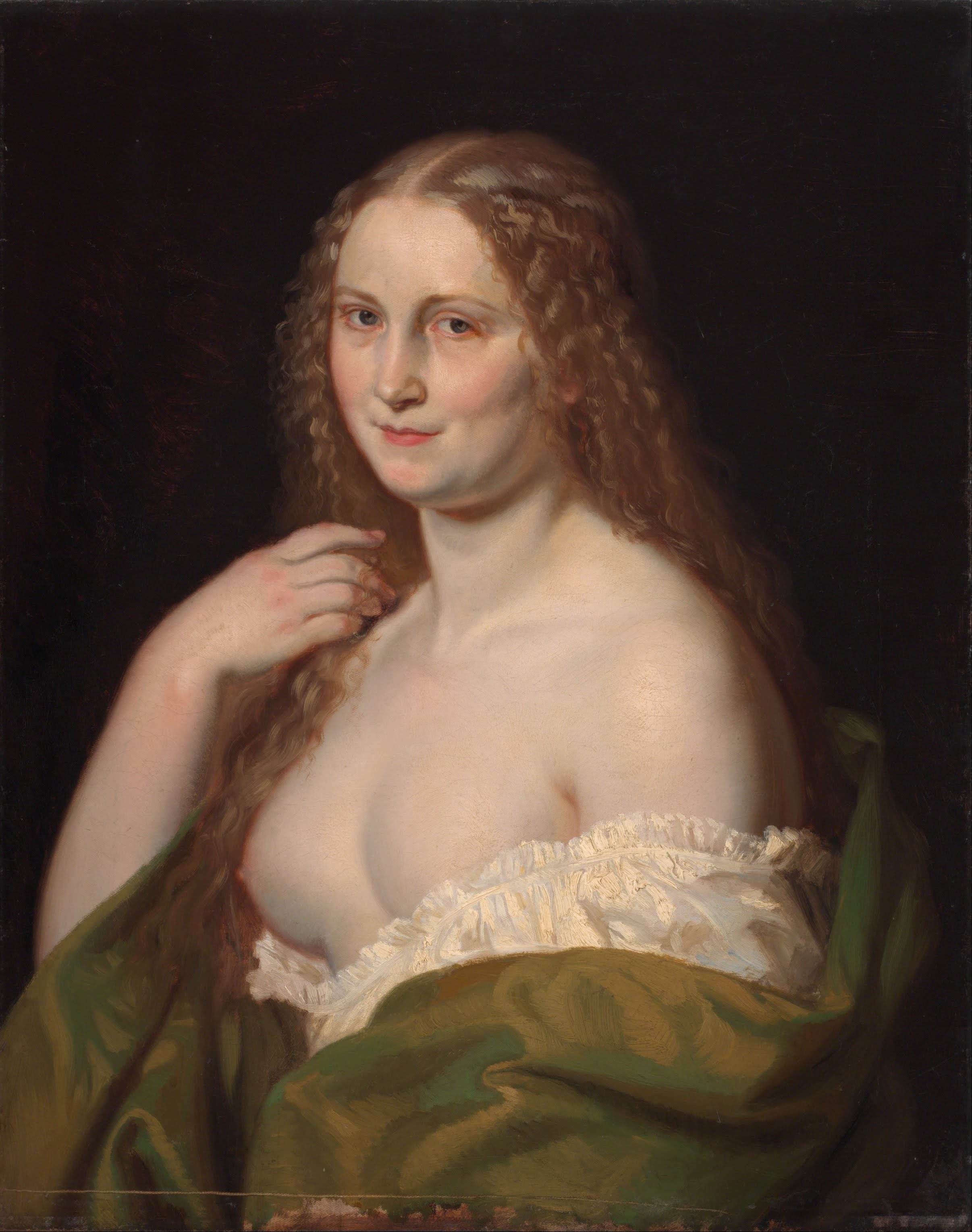
Josephine, Josef Mánes, 1855

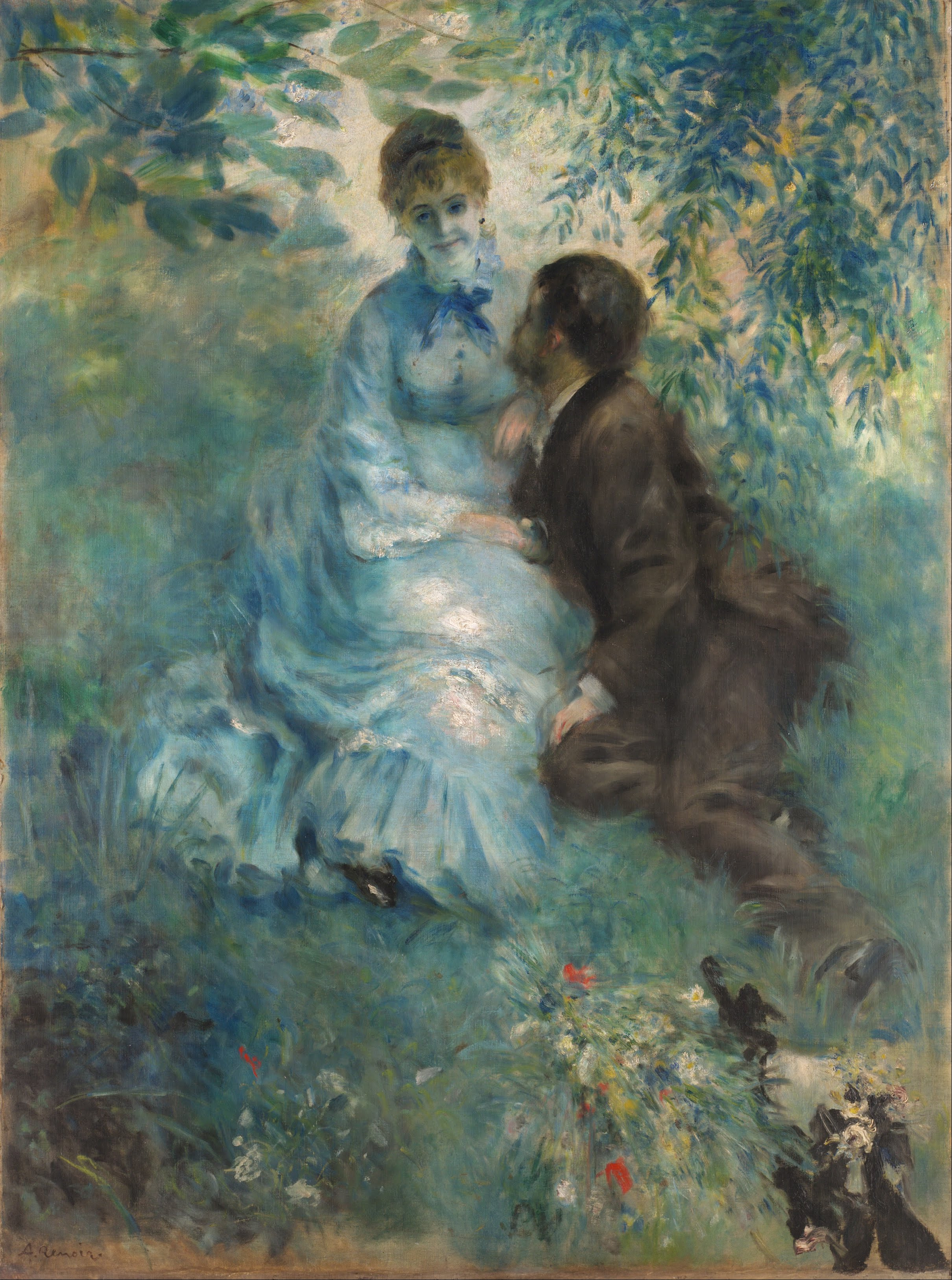
Lovers, Auguste Renoir, 1875

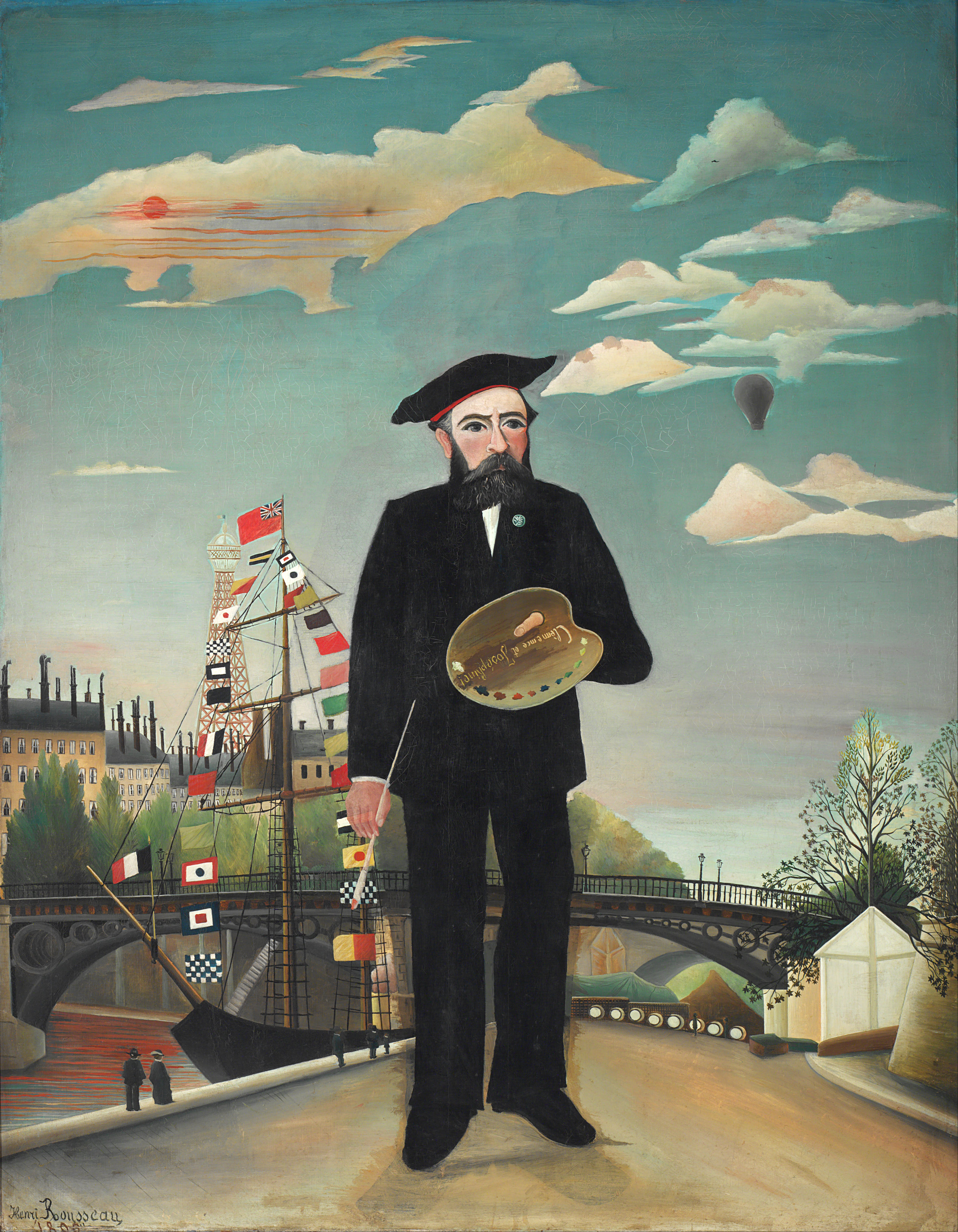
Self-portrait, Henri Rousseau, 1890

Souvenir of Le Havre, Pablo Picasso, 1912

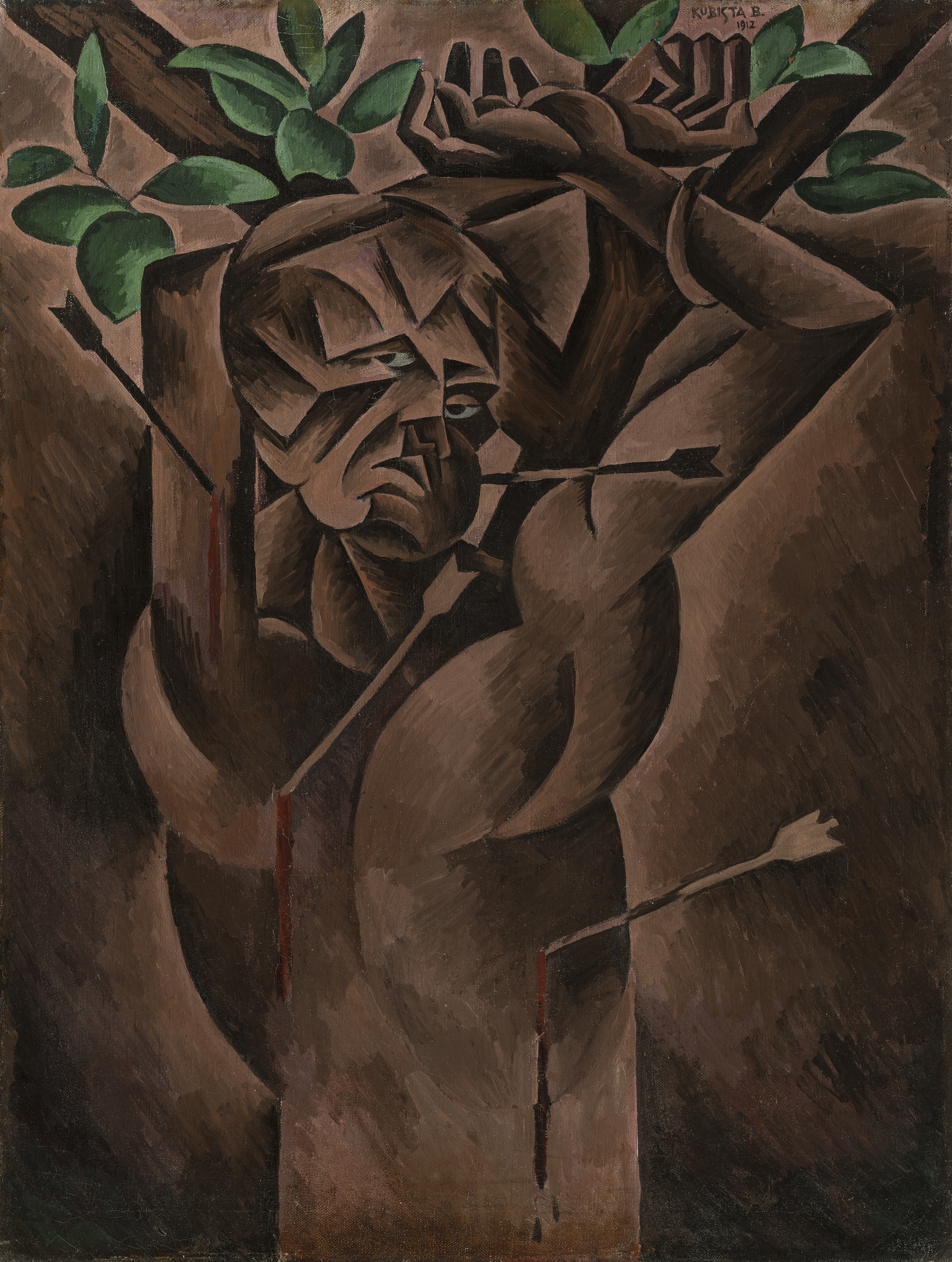
Saint Sebastian, Bohumil Kubišta, 1912

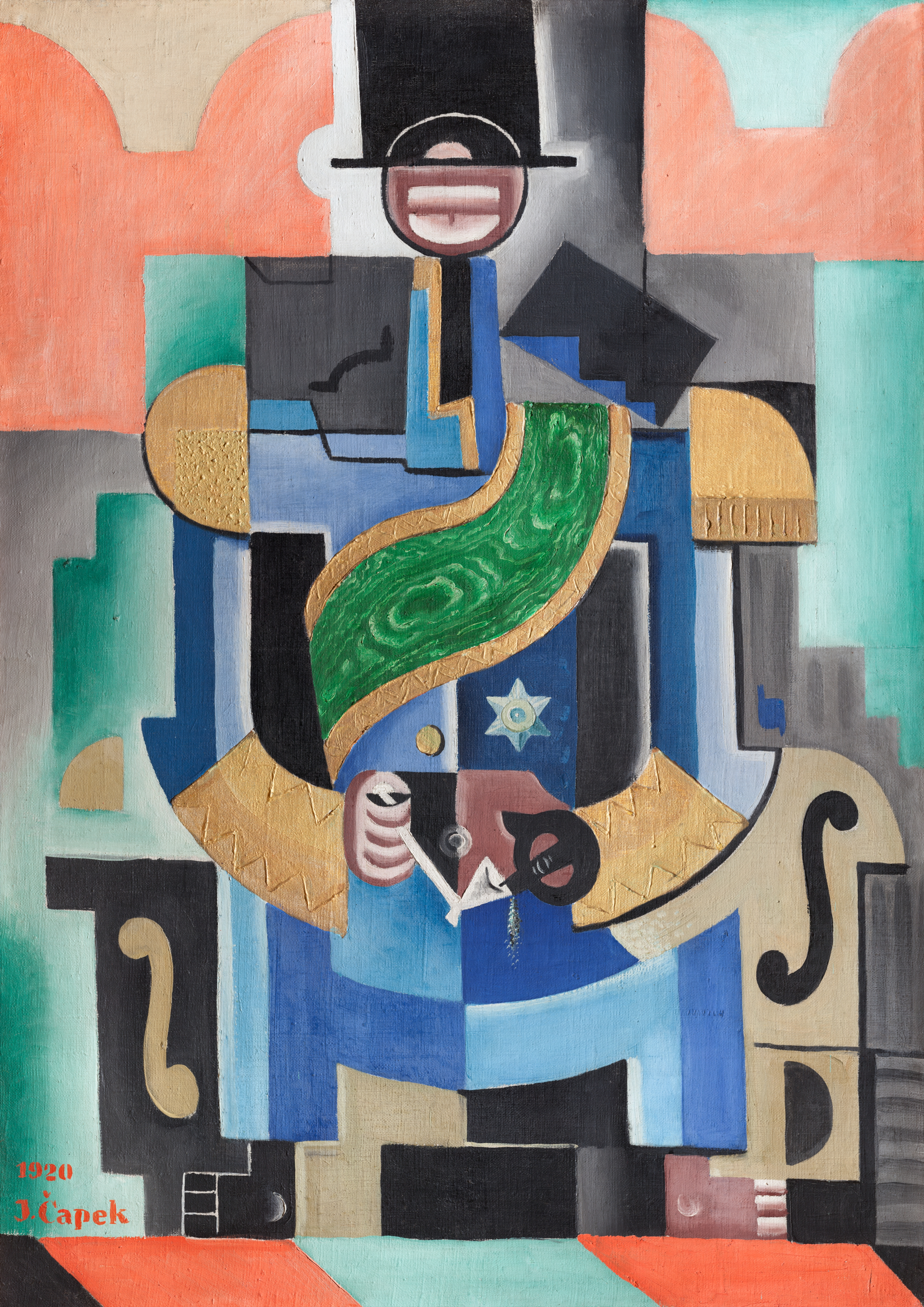
African King, Josef Čapek, 1920

== See also ==
- List of museums in Prague
- List of national galleries
- List of largest art museums
