= Czech Police Museum =

Museum in Prague, Czech Republic

- Muzeum Policie České republiky

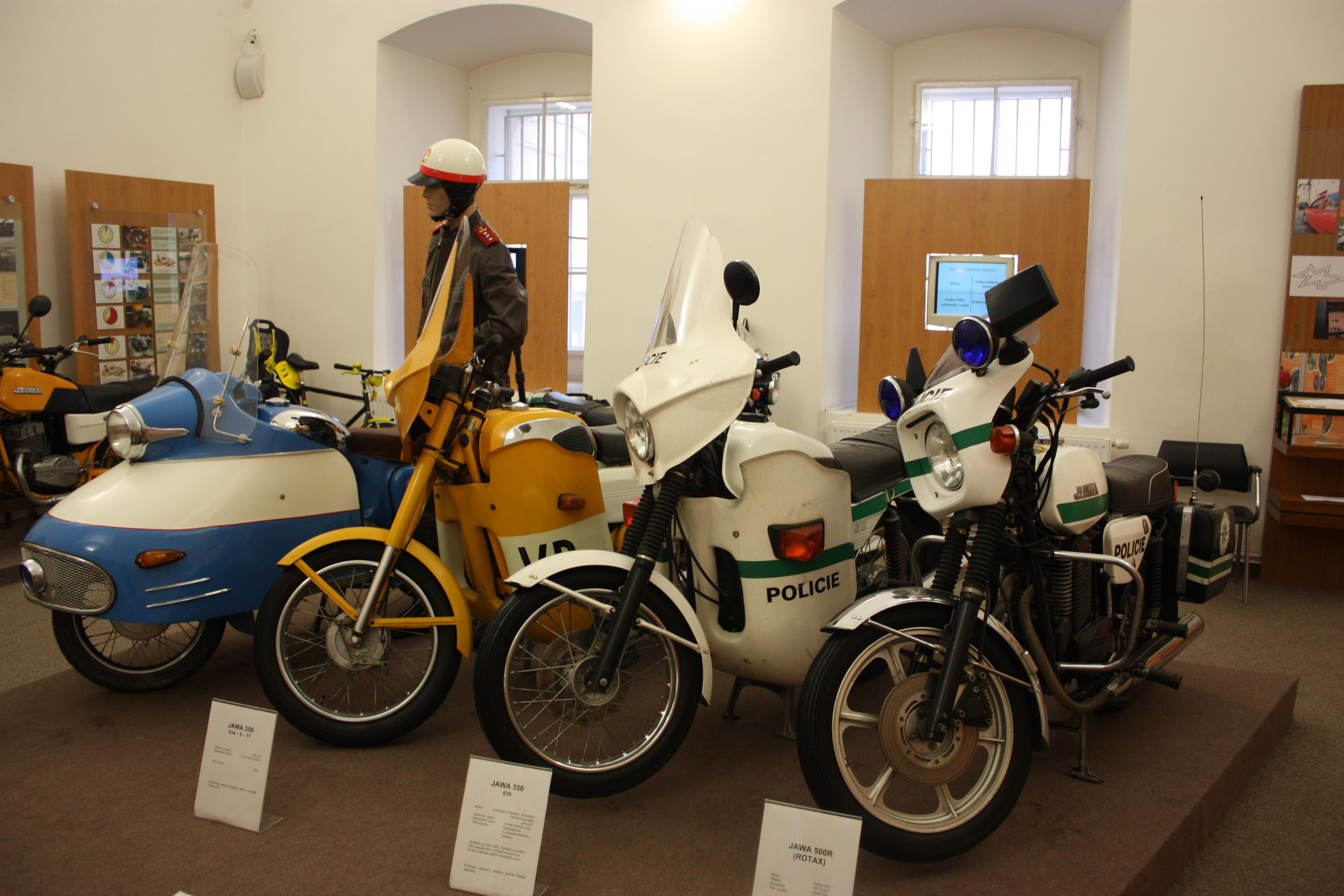
- Historical police motorcycles in the Czech Police Museum
- Interactive fullscreen map
- Established: 1990; 35 years ago
- Location: Ke Karlovu 453/1, Prague 1, Czech Republic, 120 00
- Coordinates: 50.069°N 14.428°E
- Website: https://www.muzeumpolicie.cz/

Czech Police Museum (Czech: Muzeum Policie České republiky - Museum of Police of the Czech Republic) is a museum in Prague dedicated to the history of law enforcement on the territory of the Czech Republic and former Czechoslovakia. The museum is located on the grounds of the former Augustinian monastery, in the Karlov neighbourhood in the New Town of Prague. Which was founded in 1350 by Charles IV. The monastery was previously the Church of the Assumption of the Blessed Virgin Mary and St Charles the Great. When monastery was abolished by Emperor Joseph II, it passed into the possession of the state, and served at first as a warehouse, later as hospital for the treatment of infectious diseases, almshouse and during World War I a centre for army convalescents.

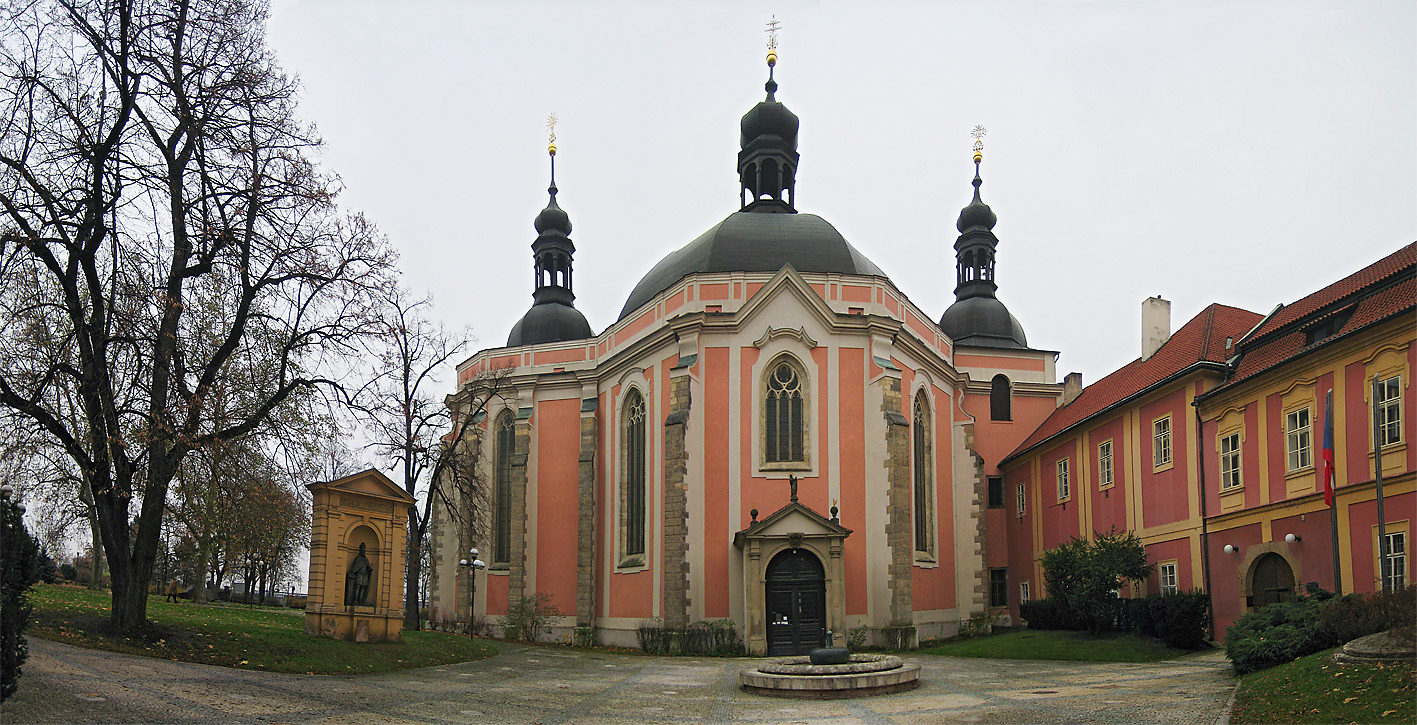
Church of the Assumption of the Blessed Virgin Mary and St Charles the Great in Karlov, Prague

In the 1960s it was acquired by the Ministry of the Interior, which set it up as a state regional archive and later a museum. The current museum documents the history and activities of the state security corps, presenting their specialised departments including criminal investigation, from 1918 to the present. This museum documents and presents the history, development and operation of law enforcement forces in the former Czechoslovakia since its inception to the present. In addition to permanent exhibitions concerning forensic science, criminal investigation, borders protection or history of petty crimes in Old Prague, the museum also has temporary exhibitions. The museum is open daily except Monday.

== See also ==
- List of museums in Prague
- Police of the Czech Republic
