= St. Peter of Slivice =

The sculpture of St. Peter of Slivice comes from the Church of St. Peter in Slivice, founded by Jan of Jenštejn, Archbishop of Prague, in 1362. It ranks among early works by the "Master of the Krumlov Madonna" and is exhibited on loan at the permanent collection of the National Gallery in Prague.

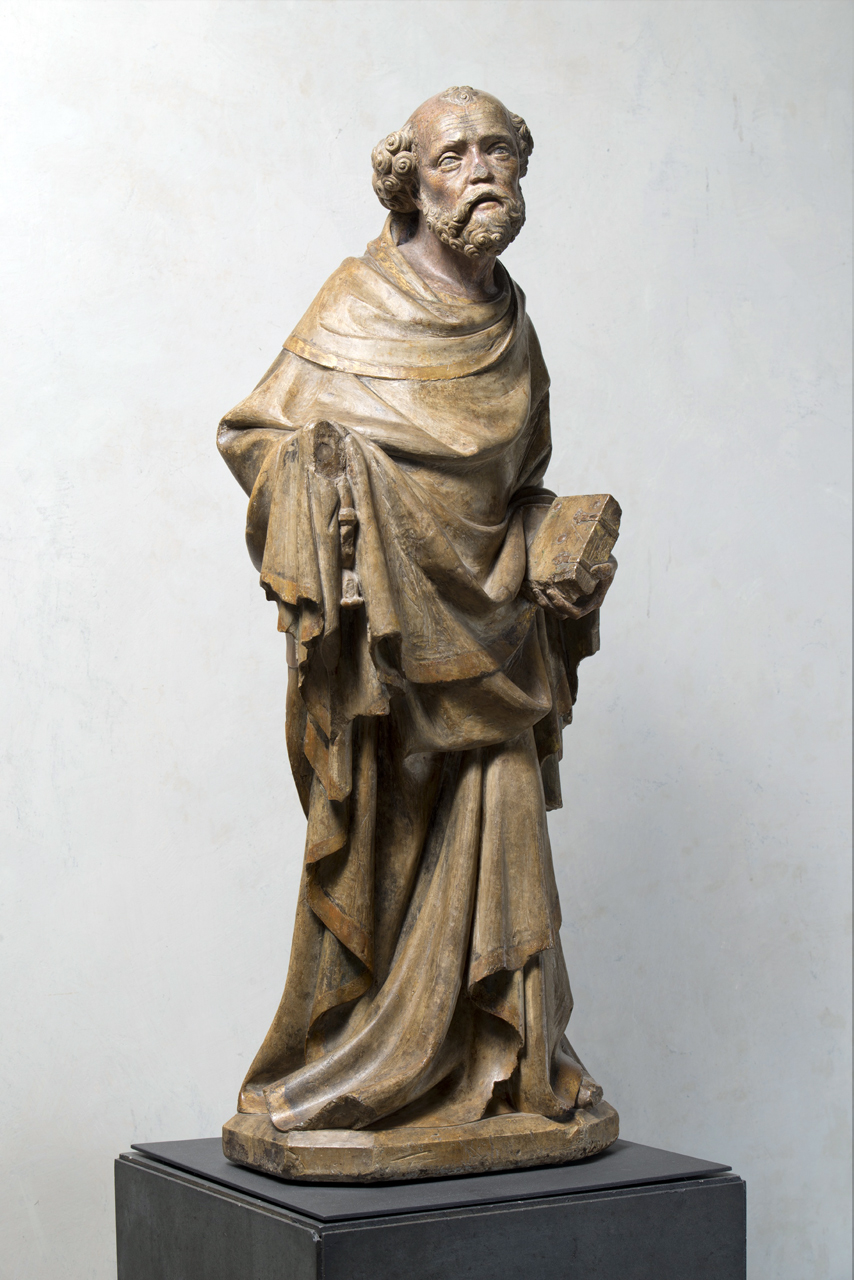
St. Peter of Slivice, National Gallery Prague

== Description and context ==
The sculpture dates from the period around 1395 and is 91.5 cm tall. It was carved out of golden Prague marlstone and bears traces of polychromy and gilding. The figure lacks its traditional attributes (such as keys), though the fact that it is St. Peter is shown by the typology of the face and the sculpture's original location in the Church of St. Peter. The figure is portrayed in counterpose, with a wealth of drapery that creates deep transverse hollows and vertical pleating, also obscuring the body's proportions. The naturalistic face of an old man and the details of the hands contrast with the hair and beard that are stylised in corkscrew-shaped curls. The individualisation of the face's expression follows on from tombstones by the Parler workshop, though in accordance with the trends of the International Gothic style its expression is more idealised and a sense of resignation is manifested in the posture of the figure. In terms of its type and, for example, the shape of its collar the sculpture has much in common with the figure of St. Bartholomew in the panel painting by a follower of the Master of the Třeboň Altarpiece, the Madonna between SS Batholomew and Margaret (c. 1400).

The sculpture of St. Peter represented Czech Gothic art at international exhibitions in Paris and Montreal. It is a typical example of the International Gothic style that is characterised by a tension between idealism and naturalism, and in which form gradually acquires as much meaning as symbolic content. This style has its origin in the Parler workshop at St Vitus Cathedral where corresponding signs can be found in the tombstones of Bohemian kings, in busts in the cathedral's triforium and the sculpture of St. Wenceslas that was probably carved by Heinrich IV. Parler.

The most characteristic material of Prague sculpture production in the late 14th and early 15th century is marlstone, which was mined in quarries at White Mountain and in Přední Kopanina. For a short time after being quarried, marlstone retains its softness and moisture, enabling it to be worked in great detail with carving tools. On the basis of the analysis of material it is possible to determine the Prague origin of numerous sculptures exported from Bohemia to Silesia, Austria and the Rhineland. During the weak rule of Wenceslas IV, it was above all the Archbishop of Prague and leading noble families who commissioned these demanding works of art. Because of their stylised beauty, sculptures of the International Gothic style increasingly became a focus of criticism by church reformers in the period before the outbreak of the Hussite Wars and many fell victim to iconoclasm.

=== Related works ===
- Madonna of Plzeň
- Madona of Krumlov
- Madona of Halstatt
- Madona of Šternberk
- Moses console, Toruń
- Tombstones by Peter Parler, St. Vitus Cathedral
- Adoration of the Magi, St. Stephen's Cathedral, Vienna
