= Sternberg Palace =

- Šternberský palác
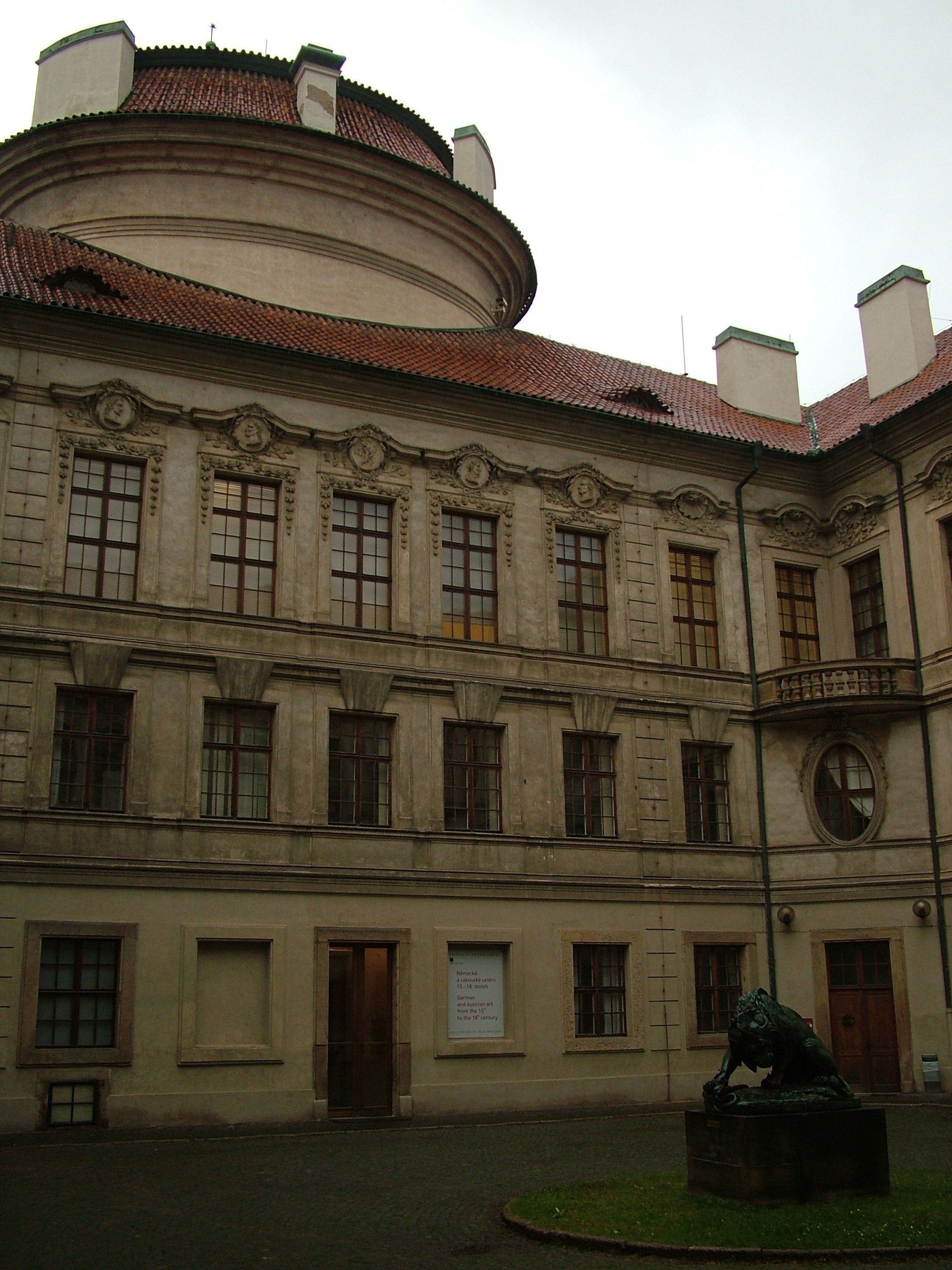
- The west wing viewed from inside the courtyard
- Interactive map of the Sternberg Palace area

General information
- Type: Library
- Architectural style: Baroque
- Location: Prague, Czech Republic, Hradčanské náměstí 57/15; 118 00 Prague 1-Hradčany; Czech Republic
- Coordinates: 50°05′25″N 14°23′48″E
- Current tenants: National Gallery Prague
- Completed: c. 1698; 328 years ago

Design and construction
- Architect: Disputed

Sternberg Palace (Czech: Šternberský palác) is a Baroque building in Prague, Czech Republic. It currently serves as a gallery of the National Gallery Prague and is a cultural monument.

== History ==
The site of the Sternberg Palace previously held two Gothic houses from the mid 1300s. The palace was built after 1698 by Václav Vojtěch of Šternberk, for whom it was named after. The architect is unknown, the most commonly named people are Giovanni Battista Alliprandi, Domenico Martinelli and Jan Santini Aichel, through Johann Bernhard Fischer von Erlach and Christoph Dientzenhofer are also occasionally speculated. The southern wing of the building would remain unfinished, before being fully constructed from 1835 to 1842 by Jan Novotný.

In the early 1880s (Note: Reported as 1811 and 1814.) the palace was purchased by the Society of Patriotic Friends of Art, an aristocratic Czech association that managed a large gallery. The Patriotic Friends of the Arts had recently been evicted from the Czernin Palace, which the government of the Austrian Empire requisitioned for use as a military hospital. While owned by The Patriotic Friends of the Arts, the building often housed several other occupants. From 1821 to 1847 they lent a section of the building to the Bohemian National Museum to house its collections. The palace also served as a workplace for major Czech figures of the sciences and humanities, such as Pavel Josef Šafařík, Carl Borivoj Presl, Václav Hanka and Antonín Mánes. The Patriotic Friends of the Arts would remain in the palace until 1871 when they sold the building and moved to the mansion of Joseph Porges von Portheim. In 1872 the Saint Anna Association of Ladies and Girls founded the Ernestinum, a shelter for the mentally disabled in the palace. They would move out of Prague in 1918, and the palace was used as a military school until 1945. From 1946 to 1947 the building was renovated and made the seat of the National Gallery Prague.

Two of the stolen paintings, Mandolin and Glass of Pernod (1911) (left) and Absinthe and Cards (1912) (right)

In early 1991, the Sternberg Palace experienced a major art theft. The immediate years following the Velvet Revolution saw an extremely high rise in theft due to several reasons. President Václav Havel granted amnesty to a majority of Czechoslovakia's prisoners on human rights grounds. Additionally, security had not adapted to a more open society, and an open border to the west across which art could be smuggled. The Sternberg Palace had not updated security practices, lacking an electronic security system in its garden. On the night of May 6, three men released in the amnesty acts scaled the wall leading from the street to the raised garden, then entered into the palace by breaking the glass of an unguarded door. They stole a total of four paintings, all by Pablo Picasso, Mandolin and Glass of Pernod (1911), Still Life with a Goblet (1922), Port of Cadaqués (1910) and Absinthe and Cards (1912). After taking the paintings, they fled via car, leaving before the doorman arrived to investigate the commotion. Due to the high value of the paintings, (Note: Contemporaneously estimated at a total value of 1.5 billion Czechoslovak koruna.) the thieves attempted to sell the paintings on the international black market, which eventually drew police attention. Police eventually discovered three of the paintings in one of the thieves apartments, and the final painting in a railway station locker. They were subsequently returned to the Sternberg Palace.

After the Czech government began restituting churches for items and property that had been seized by the government, the gallery raised concert that the Sternberg Palace would be one of the restituted properties because it had been owned by the Saint Anna Association of Ladies and Girls. However, it was eventually confirmed that properties owned by the National Gallery were not part of the return. The palace was closed during the COVID-19 pandemic. During the closure repairs were planned, though were unsuccessful. It reopened in late 2020, with a new permanent exhibition reminiscent of the works housed during the palace's ownership by the Society of Patriotic Friends of Art.

== Design ==
Sternberg Palace was designed in a Renaissance and Baroque style, contrasting the older Gothic buildings it replaced. Due to the split in the two original Gothic buildings, the main facade is split into two sections. The place is two stories tall and consists of four wings around a central courtyard. Very little of the baroque interior remains, instead being a mix of styles from various periods.

Outside the palace's west wing is a large garden elevated above the adjoining Deer Moat. It contains a pond and several sculptures, including a large stork created by Jan lauda and a bronze statue of a lion crushing a boa constrictor by Antoin-Louis Bary. The original Baroque appearance of the garden is unknown, and its modern form was created during the transfer of the palace to the National Gallery in 1947. It was reportedly maintained during the early years of National Gallery ownership by Anna Masaryková.
