= Trade Fair Palace =

- Veletržní palác
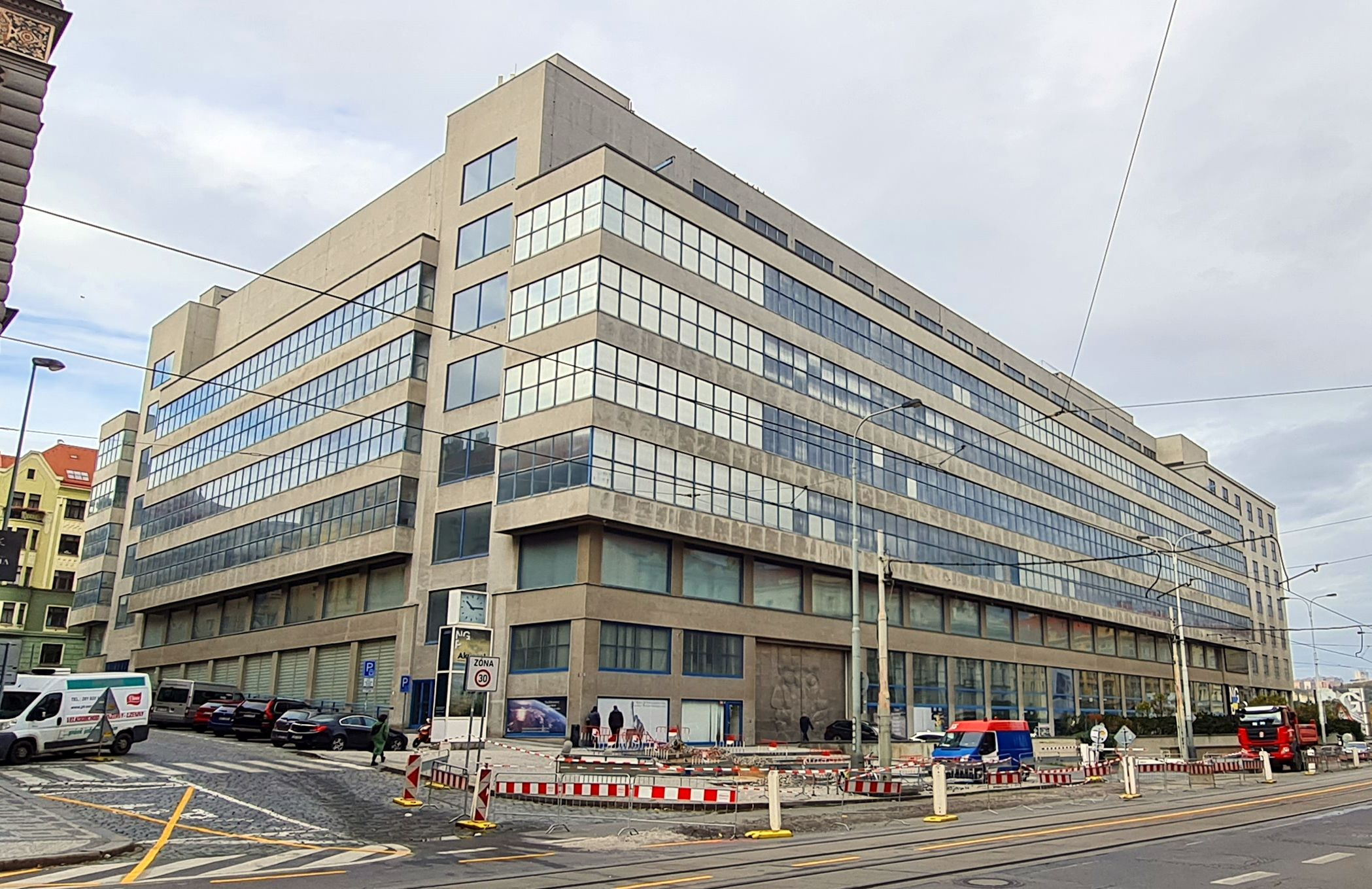
- Front view

General information
- Type: Museum
- Architectural style: Functionalism
- Location: Prague, Czech Republic, Dukelských hrdinů 530/47; 170 00 Prague 7-Holešovice; Czech Republic
- Coordinates: 50°06′04″N 14°25′57″E
- Current tenants: National Gallery Prague
- Construction started: 1925; 101 years ago
- Completed: 1928; 98 years ago

Technical details
- Floor area: 13,500 m^{2} (145,300 sq ft)

Design and construction
- Architects: Josef Fuchs and Oldřich Tyl

The Trade Fair Palace (Czech: Veletržní palác) is a functionalist building in Prague-Holešovice, Czech Republic. It currently serves as the largest gallery site of the National Gallery Prague. It was originally constructed in 1925 to serve as a hall for trade fairs; however, it was closed after a six-day-long fire broke out in 1974. Soon after the fire, it was given to the National Gallery Prague and finally reopened in 1995. The building is notable as the first functionalist building in Prague and the largest functionalist building at the time of its construction.

== History ==
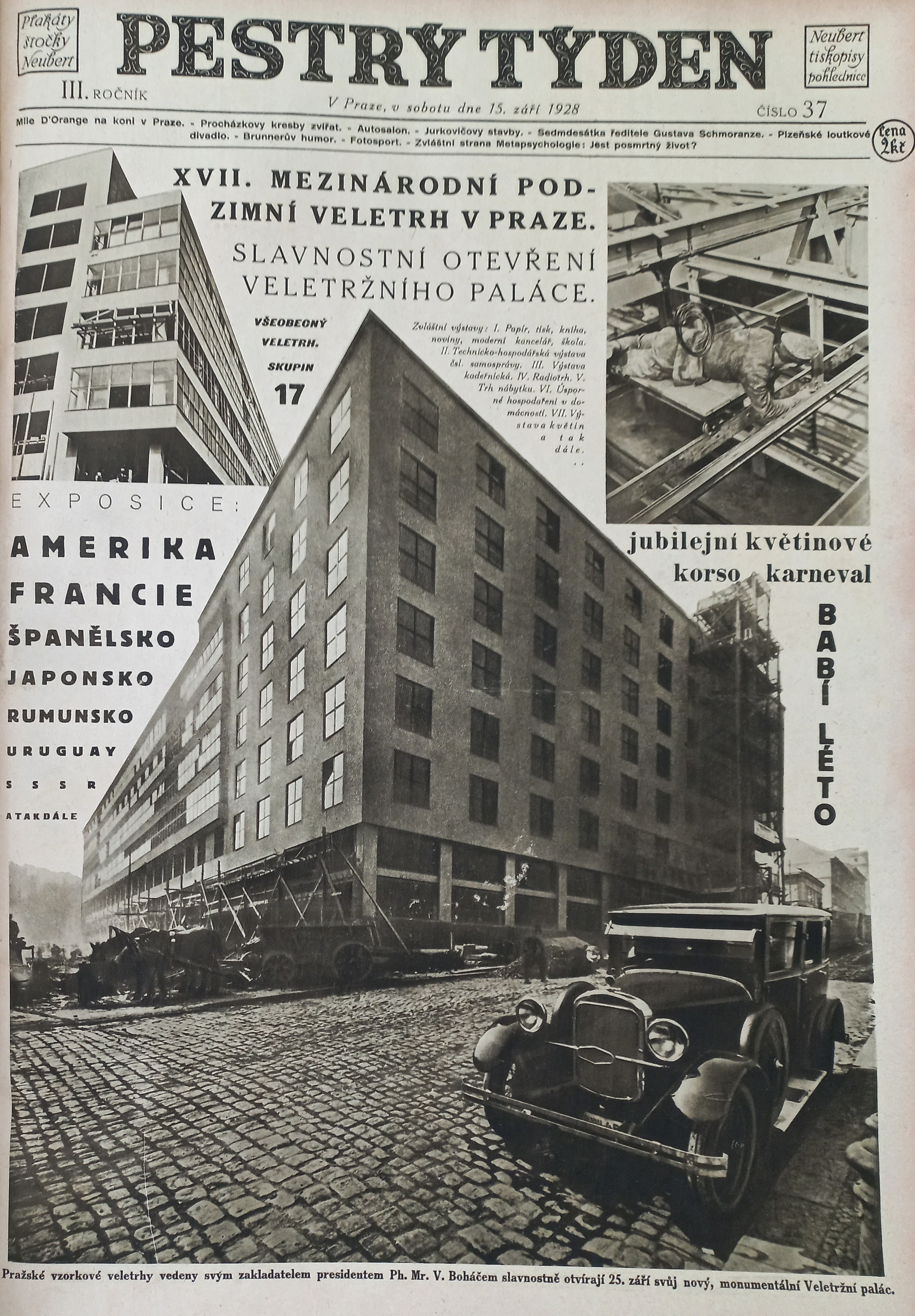
The palace at time of completion in 1928, depicted in the newspaper Pestrý týden

=== Use as a commercial building ===
The plot of land that the palace now sits on was originally a steelworks founded by Antonín Reissenzahn, primarily manufacturing farm equipment. After Czechoslovakia gained independence from Austria-Hungary, foreign trade became increasingly important, and thus the Czechoslovak government decided it was necessary to create a trade exhibition hall. The chosen location was outside Prague's exhibition grounds, where the factory was located. While originally conceptualized as a complex of several trade fair buildings, the only one to be constructed was the palace. In 1924, six Czech architects, Josef Fuchs, Oldřich Tyl, Alois Dryák, František Roith, Miloš Vaněček, and E. Kotek were invited to participate in an architectural design competition for the right to design the palace. While Fuchs only won third place in the first round, he was invited to work with the winner, Tyl, for the second round. The two closely beat a more traditional and impractical design by Alois Dryák, and construction began the spring of next year.

On 28 September 1928, the palace was opened, the largest functionalist building in the world and the first functionalist building in Prague at the time of its completion. The palace was ceremonially inaugurated with the first public showing of the complete Slav Epic by Alfons Mucha. The paintings, 20 large canvases depicting mythological historical events in Czech history were extremely popular in Czechoslovakia. The grand opening had an attendance of up to 560,000 people. The palace would host 26 spring and autumn fairs up to its closure in 1941.

During the Nazi occupation of Czechoslovakia, the grounds of the palace complex were used as an assembly point, from which Jews living in Prague were transported to concentration camps. Jews were placed in huts adjacent to the palace, instead of the building itself.

After the end of World War II, the building continued to be used for trade shows from 1946 to 1951, focusing less on commercial interests, and more on political ties to the Allies and the USSR. The building was decorated with banners and iconography in the socialist realist style. In 1951 the building was converted into administrative office space for foreign trade companies.

=== Fire and subsequent rebuilding ===
On 14 August 1974, a fire broke out in the fourth-floor paint shop that quickly spread to the rest of the building. 600 people were evacuated by firefighters from the underground cinema, and 6 from the southern terrace. The fire lasted for six days, only being extinguished on 20 August. The three theories considered for the source of the fire were arson, an electrical fire, or that the light and heat of the building ignited rags soaked in toluene.

The building was closed, and a debate began of whether to rebuild it, demolish it, or even subdivide it into smaller buildings. In 1976, the decision was made to begin renovations faithful to the original design, after campaigning by the architectural firm SIAL. SIAL was placed in charge of rebuilding, with Karel Hubáček made project manager, and Miroslav Masák made lead architect. Two years later in 1978, the building was given to the National Gallery Prague to hold modern art collections. In April 1985, the artist Margita Titlová Ylovsky hosted a one-day art exhibition in the palace while it was still actively being rebuilt. Lights were makeshift, and the ceiling was still unfinished. While it had been originally planned to reopen in 1988, rebuilding took significantly longer than expected. On 13 December 1995, the palace was officially reopened, with an inaugural exhibition titled Jak fénix, (lit. Like a phoenix).

== Design and critique ==
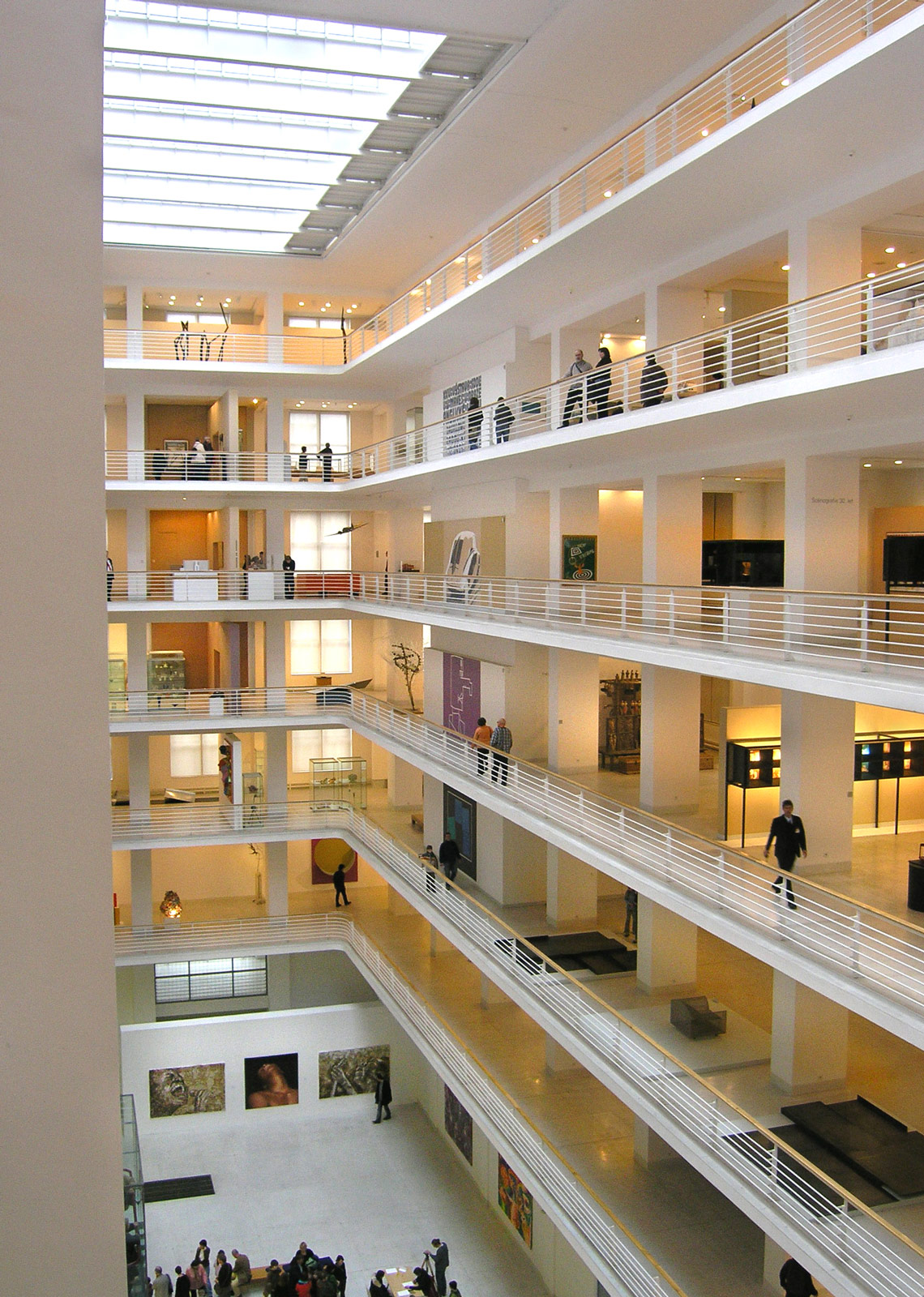
The palace's atrium as viewed from above

The building is eight stories tall, and is primarily constructed from reinforced concrete, with long strips on plain glass on the exterior. The building is formed around a central atrium, with layers of corridors circling the center. In the 30s an underground cinema was built, along with a ground floor restaurant and a café on the 6th floor.

The palace made a significant impression on Le Corbusier during his 1928 visit to Prague. While he significantly critiqued its form, he believed it demonstrated that his proposal for the Palace of Nations was not overambitious. It seems to have widened his horizons, with Corbusier stating afterwards that "When I saw the Trade Fair Palace, I realize how I have to create great buildings, I, who have up till now built only a few pretty small houses on modest budgets." The Czech avant-garde architect Karel Teige gave a much more positive review of the building, commending its practical design and incorporation of light.

== Exhibitions ==
The palace currently houses five permanent collections, containing art and architecture from 1796 to 2021. While the palace primarily holds modern art and contemporary art, there are some premodern artists featured, such as Antonio Canova and Josef Mánes.
