= Kinský Palace (Prague) =

Building in Prague, Czech Republic

Coordinates: 50°05′17″N 14°25′18″E

- Palác Kinských
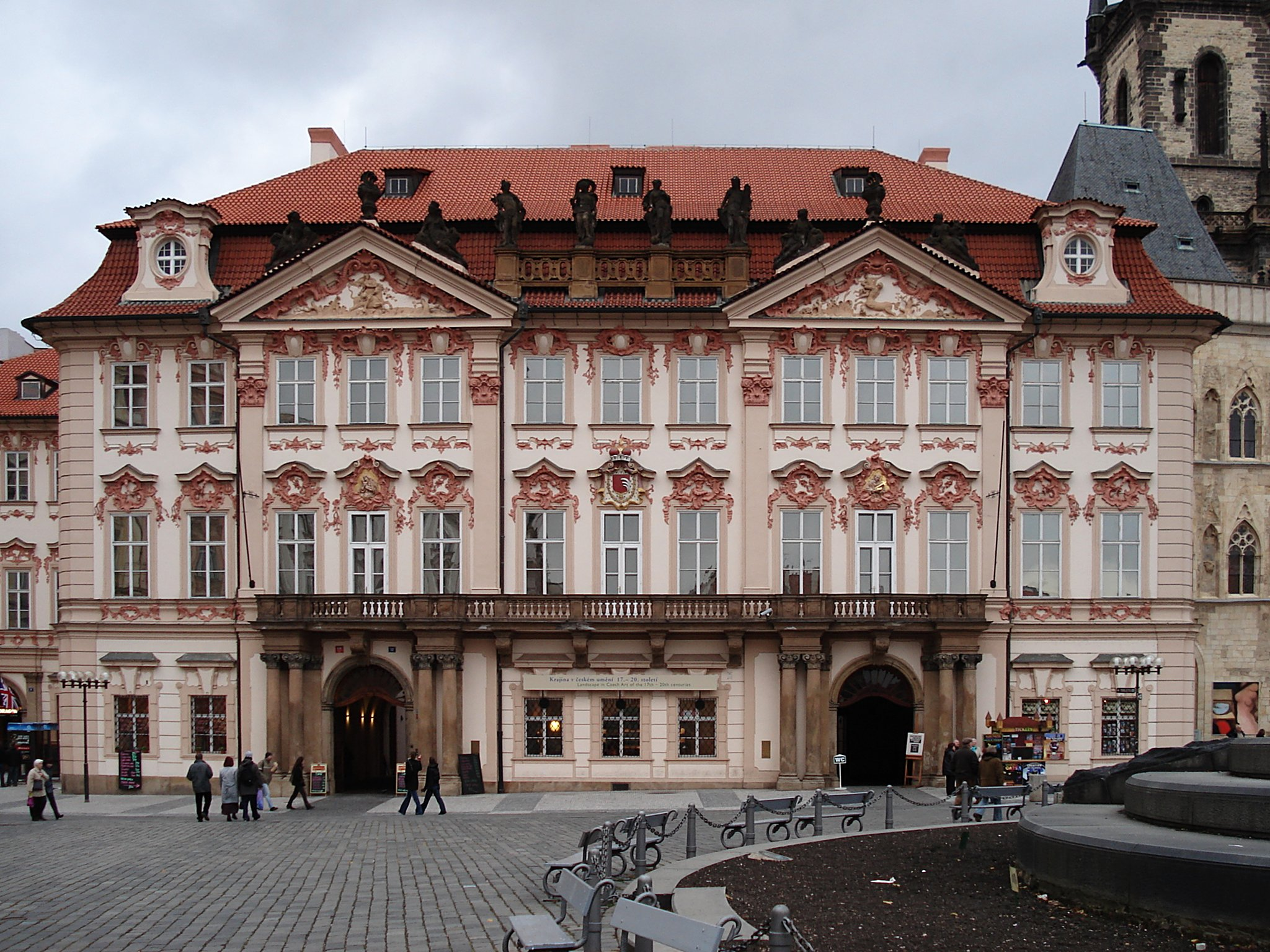
- Front view
- Interactive map of the Kinský Palace area

General information
- Architectural style: Rococo
- Location: Prague, Czech Republic
- Current tenants: National Gallery in Prague
- Construction started: 1755
- Completed: 1765

Design and construction
- Architect: Kilian Ignaz Dientzenhofer

Website
- ngprague.cz

Kinský Palace (Czech: Palác Kinských, German: Palais Goltz-Kinsky) is a former palace and now an art museum in Prague, Czech Republic. It is located on the Old Town Square in the Old Town quarter of Prague. The palace's name refers to its former ownership by the Kinsky (Czech: Kinský) noble family.

== Early history ==
The palace was originally built for the Golz family between 1755 and 1765. As a result, the palace is also known as Golz-Kinský Palace (Palác Golz-Kinských).

The building was designed by Kilian Ignaz Dientzenhofer and is Rococo in style. The exterior is stucco and is painted in pink and white. There are statues by Ignaz Franz Platzer on the exterior, which are of the classical elements. In 1768, the Kinský family purchased the home from the Golz family.

Later Austrian and Czech Nobel Peace Prize winner Bertha von Suttner (née Countess Kinsky von Wchinitz und Tettau) was born in the building in 1843.

Franz Kafka's father, Hermann Kafka, was a haberdasher. He had his store at the palace, which was located on the ground floor. Franz Kafka attended secondary school at the palace, from 1893 until 1901. In the interwar period, the palace housed the legation of the Republic of Poland (1922–1934).

== Later history ==
The palace was used by Klement Gottwald in 1948 to address an audience from the palace's balcony. This took place in the final episode of the 1948 Czechoslovak coup d'état.

Since 1949, the palace has been under the administration of the National Gallery, and the building is currently used as an art museum.

Since 1992, the building has been protected as a national cultural monument.

== See also ==
- List of Baroque residences
