= Schwarzenberg Palace (Prague) =

Art museum in the Czech Republic

- Schwarzenberský palác
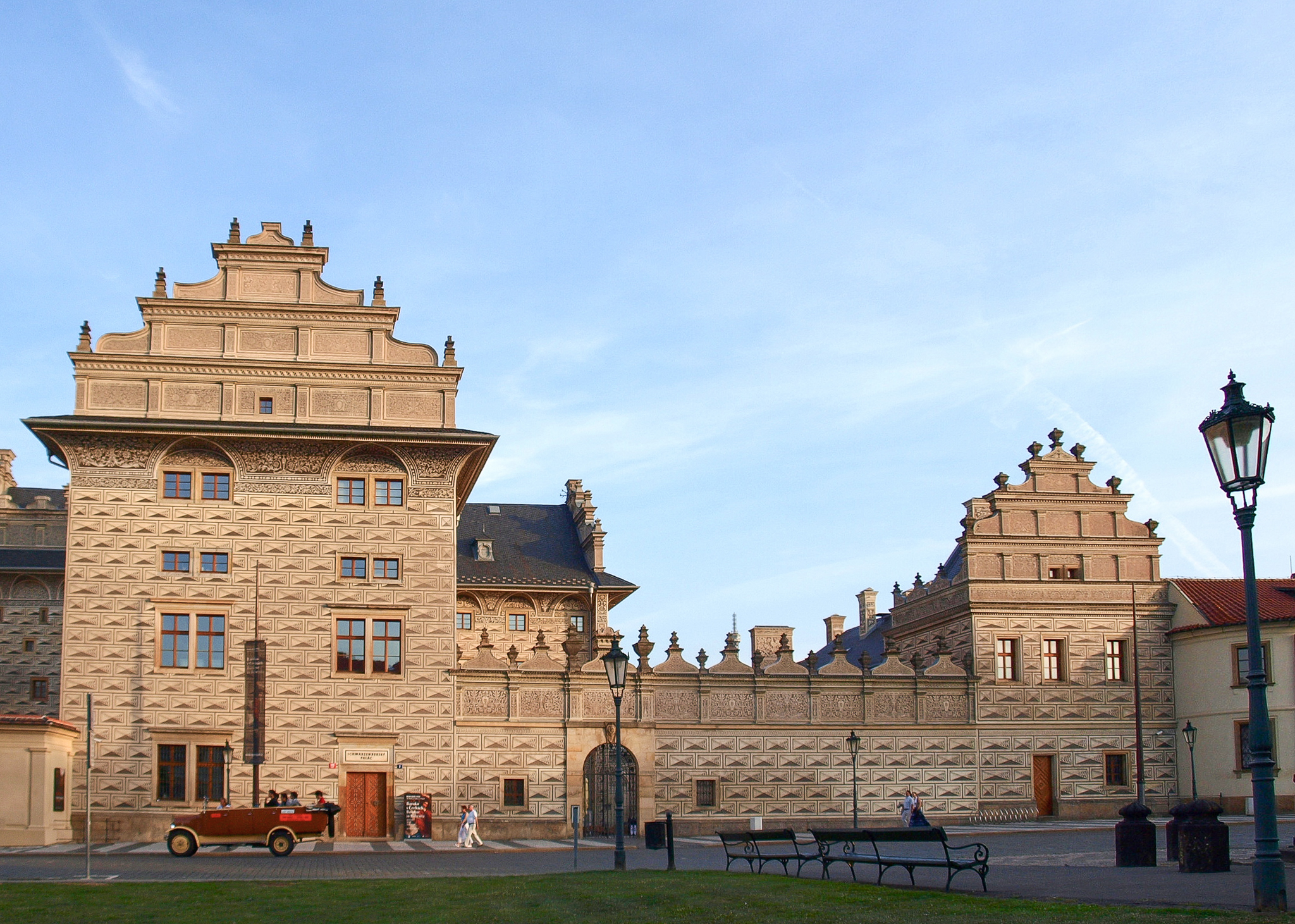
- Front view

General information
- Type: Palace; Museum
- Architectural style: Renaissance
- Location: Prague, Czech Republic, Hradčanské náměstí 185/2; 118 00 Prague 1-Hradčany; Czech Republic
- Coordinates: 50°05′20″N 14°23′49″E
- Current tenants: National Gallery Prague
- Construction started: 1545; 481 years ago
- Completed: 1567; 459 years ago
- Renovated: 1698; 328 years ago; 2002; 24 years ago

Design and construction
- Architect: Agostino Galli

Schwarzenberg Palace (Czech: Schwarzenberský palác) is a Renaissance building in Prague, Czech Republic. It currently serves as a gallery of the National Gallery Prague and is a cultural monument.

== History ==
Before the construction of Schwarzenberg Palace, the site housed several medieval buildings including the workshop of Master Theodoric. They were damaged after a fire in 1541, and several were subsequently purchased by Johann IV Popel of Lobkowicz. Popel of Lobkowicz hired Agostino Galli to construct the palace, which was built from 1545 to 1567. Popel of Lobkowicz purchased the final building on the plot later, turning it into the palace's western wing.

Schwarzenberg Palace passed to Jiří Popel of Lobkowicz; however, it was seized after Popel of Lobkovic led an opposition movement against Rudolph II. It was then given to Peter Vok of Rosenberg, from whom it passed to the House of Švamberk and House of Eggenberg. It finally passed to the House of Schwarzenberg through marriage in the early 18th century. It underwent significant renovations under the Schwarzenbergs, with the dwelling area being fully rebuilt by Anton Erhard Martinelli and Antonín Haffenecker, and the sgaffitos being finished with designs from Josef Schulz and Jan Koula.

The palace became unoccupied over time as members of the Schwarzenberg family moved to Vienna, the capital of the Austrian Empire. In 1908, it was freely leased to the National Technical Museum, who opened to the public two years later. During the Nazi occupation of Czechoslovakia, it was turned into a military museum, and was damaged during the Prague uprising. After the war, it was given to the Military History Institute Prague. From 2000 to 2007 it underwent significant renovations. In 2002, the National Gallery Prague acquired the palace from Ministry of Defence.

== Design ==
The palace its notable for its extensive sgraffito designs, which cover 7,000 square metres (75,000 sq ft) of the buildings surface. The first group of sgraffito was created with the building in a North Italian style. They were expanded from 1871 to 1893 with the designs of Jan Koula and Josef Schulz. The sgraffito would be repaired several times in subsequent years according to the original designs. Most of the sgraffito are repeating black-and-white cuboid blocks, though there are detailed carvings, such as a rooster and owl next to the palace's sundial.
