= Salm Palace =

- Salmovský palác
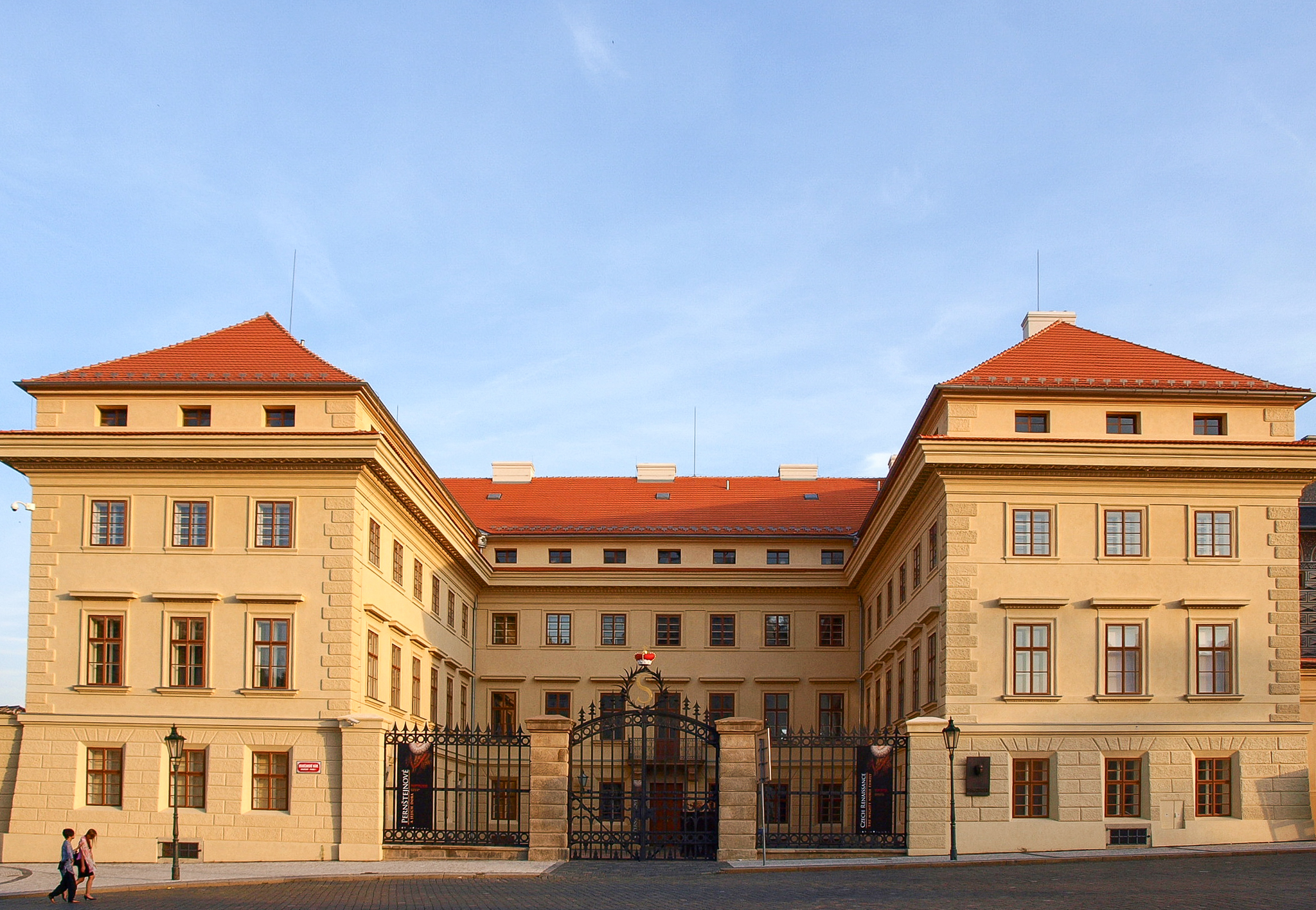
- Front view
- Interactive map of the Salm Palace area

General information
- Type: Museum
- Architectural style: Neoclassical; Empire
- Location: Prague, Czech Republic, Hradčanské náměstí 186/1; 118 00 Prague 1-Hradčany; Czech Republic
- Coordinates: 50°05′N 14°24′E
- Current tenants: National Gallery Prague
- Construction started: 1800; 226 years ago
- Completed: 1811; 215 years ago
- Renovated: 2008; 18 years ago

Design and construction
- Architect: František Pavíček

Salm Palace (Czech: Salmovský palác) is a Neoclassical building in Prague, Czech Republic. It currently serves as a collection site of the National Gallery Prague. It is protected as a cultural monument.

== History ==
Before the construction of Salm Palace, the site housed several other buildings, notably two Renaissane palaces owned by Paul Sixt III of Trautson and the lords of Šternberk. The site contained some of the oldest buildings in Prague. Before 1648 František Karel Matyáš of Šternberk joined the two palaces together. The merged building was acquired in 1770 by Josef Bretfeld, who transferred it to Archbishop of Prague Wilhelm Florentin von Salm-Salm in 1795. In 1800 he began renovations, before completely rebuilding the palace from 1810 to 1811 with designs by architect František Pavíček. Despite the scale of the renovations, many interior details were preserved. After Salm-Salms' death, the palace was acquired by the House of Schwarzenberg and used as the primogeniture's Prague residence until 1945. The building was nationalized by the Czechoslovak Socialist Republic after the Second World War.

In 2003 the building was given to the National Gallery Prague to house collections. From 2008 to 2012, the building underwent extreme renovations. In 2017 the National Gallery Prague closed the permanent exhibition of 19th-century art in the palace, with attendance more than halving the following year.

During the COVID-19 pandemic, the palace was shut down alongside the other galleries of the National Gallery Prague. The building was renovated during that time and reopened in 2022.
