= Pardubice =

- Statutory city
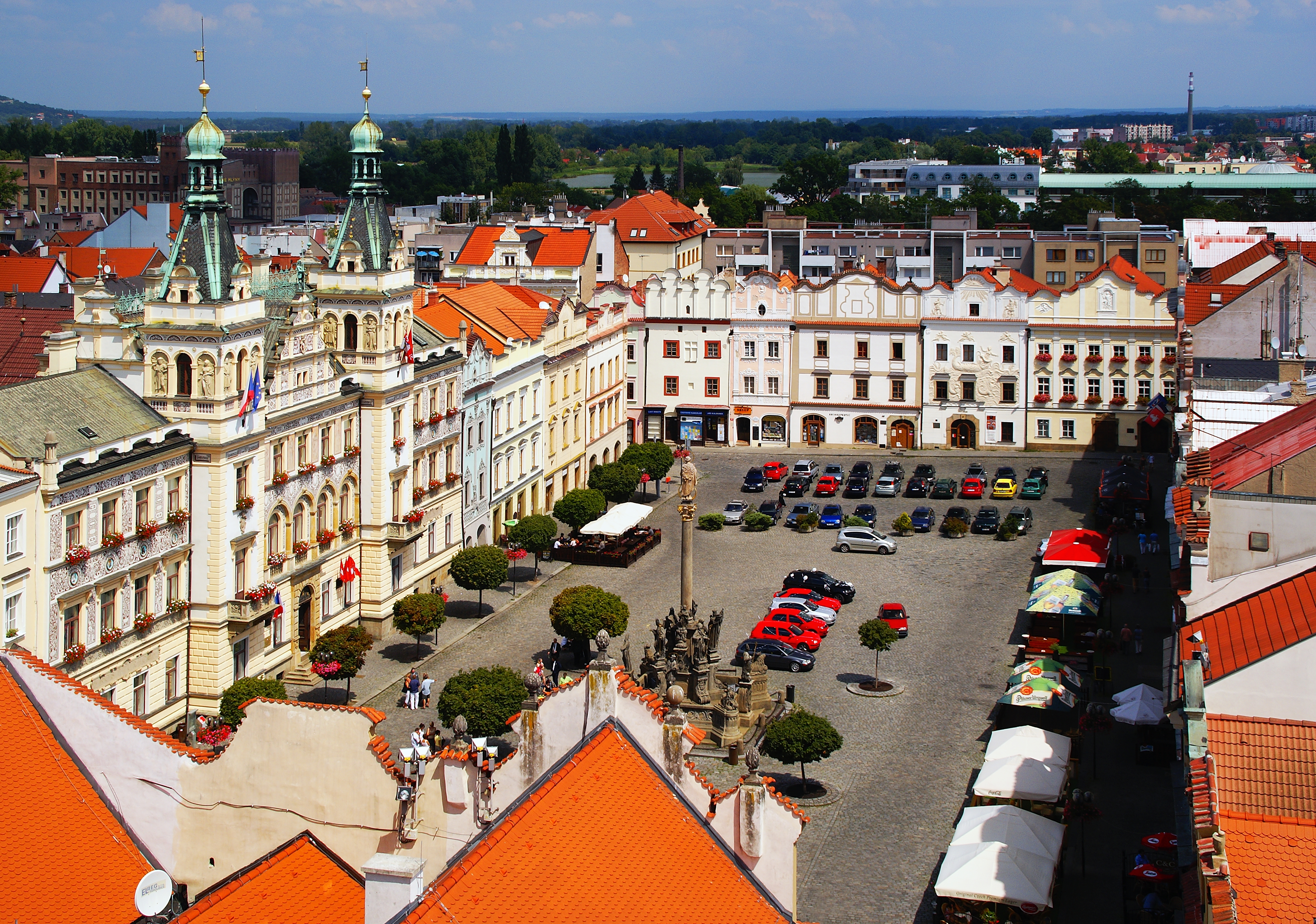
- The main square as seen from the Green Tower

- Flag Coat of arms

- Location in the Czech Republic
- Coordinates: 50°2′19″N 15°46′45″E
- Country: Czech Republic
- Region: Pardubice
- District: Pardubice
- First mentioned: 1295

Government
  - Mayor: Ondřej Tichý (ODS)

Area
  - Total: 82.66 km^{2} (31.92 sq mi)
- Elevation: 237 m (778 ft)

Population (2026-01-01)
  - Total: 92,713
  - Density: 1,122/km^{2} (2,905/sq mi)
- Time zone: UTC+1 (CET)
  - Summer (DST): UTC+2 (CEST)
- Postal code: 530 01
- Website: pardubice.eu

Pardubice (Czech pronunciation: [ˈpardubɪtsɛ]; German: Pardubitz) is a city in the Czech Republic. It has about 93,000 inhabitants. It is the capital city of the Pardubice Region and is located at the confluence of the Elbe and Chrudimka rivers.

Pardubice is known as a centre of industry, with dominant industries being the chemical industry, electrical engineering and mechanical engineering. The city is also well known for its sporting events, which include the Velká pardubická (a cross-country steeplechase), the Golden Helmet of Pardubice in motorcycle racing, and the Czech Open international chess and board games festival.

Among the most important owners of Pardubice were the Pernštejn family, during whose rule from 1491 to 1560 the city developed and gained importance. The historic centre is well preserved and is protected as an urban monument reservation. There are five significant monuments protected as national cultural monuments, including the Pardubice Castle and Pardubice Crematorium.

== Administrative division ==
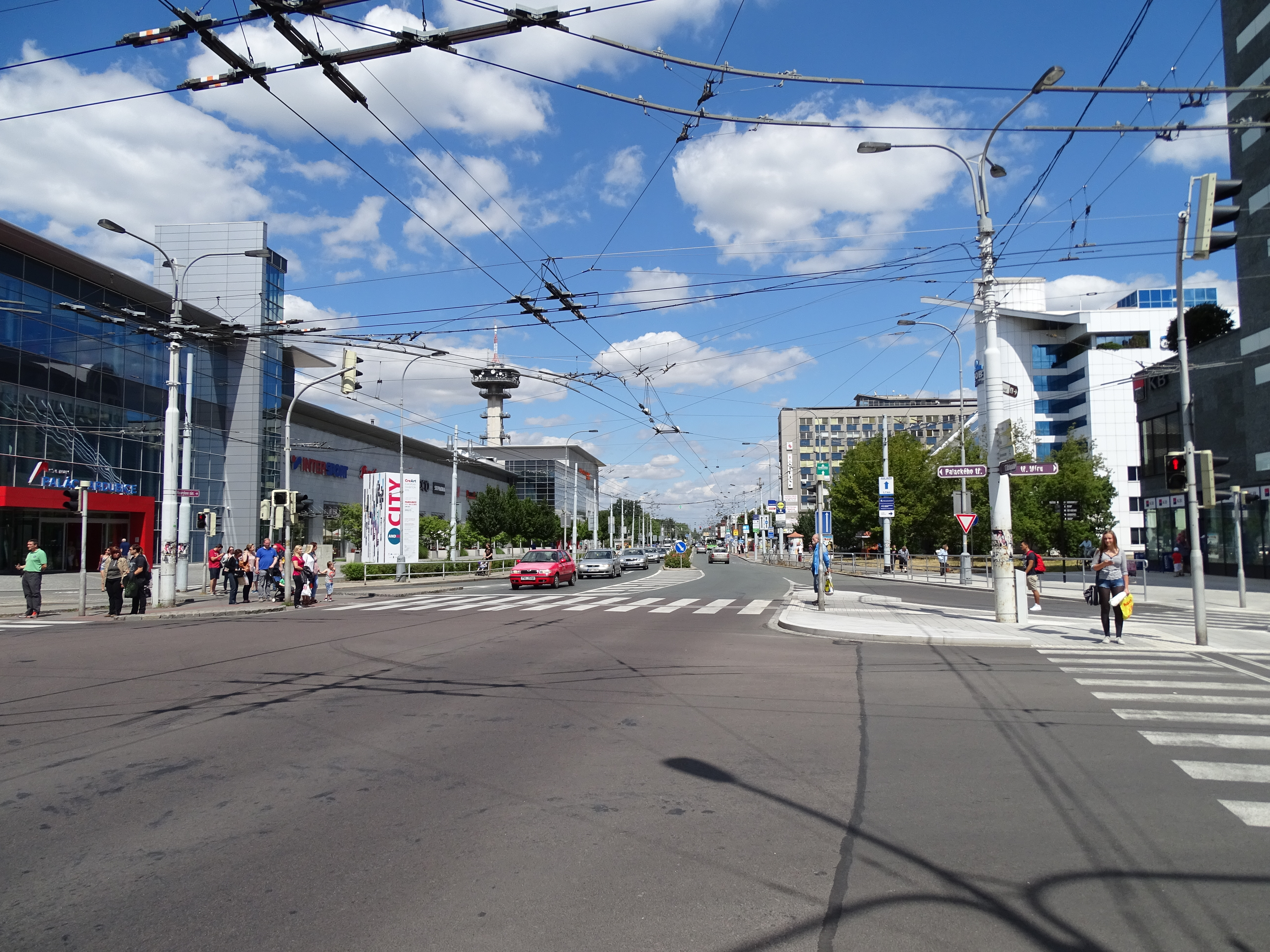
The square Masarykovo náměstí

Pardubice consists of eight self-governing boroughs. In addition, Pardubice consists of 27 municipal parts, whose borders do not respect the boundaries of the boroughs (in brackets population according to the 2021 census, in italics municipal parts only partly in the boroughs):

- Pardubice I (20,928)
  - Bílé Předměstí (6,560)
  - Pardubice-Staré Město (1,471)
  - Zámek (1)
  - Zelené Předměstí (12,896)
- Pardubice II (18,064)
  - Cihelna (2,078)
  - Polabiny (15,986)
  - Rosice (0)
- Pardubice III (15,275)
  - Bílé Předměstí (4,774)
  - Studánka (10,501)
- Pardubice IV (5,232)
  - Bílé Předměstí (445)
  - Černá za Bory (962)
  - Drozdice (103)
  - Mnětice (364)
  - Nemošice (1,294)
  - Pardubičky (1,582)
  - Staročernsko (215)
  - Studánka (220)
  - Žižín (47)
- Pardubice V (16,505)
  - Dražkovice (677)
  - Nové Jesenčany (582)
  - Zelené Předměstí (15,246)
- Pardubice VI (6,383)
  - Lány na Důlku (433)
  - Opočínek (249)
  - Popkovice (472)
  - Staré Čívice (1,164)
  - Svítkov (4,065)
  - Zelené Předměstí (0)
- Pardubice VII (6,957)
  - Doubravice (481)
  - Ohrazenice (2,124)
  - Rosice (2,155)
  - Semtín (91)
  - Trnová (2,106)
- Pardubice VIII (275)
  - Hostovice (275)

== Etymology ==
The name Pardubice is derived from the personal Polish name Porydęb. It was the name of the leader of the monks who came here from Poland. For the first time the name was recorded in the form of Pordobice.

== Geography ==
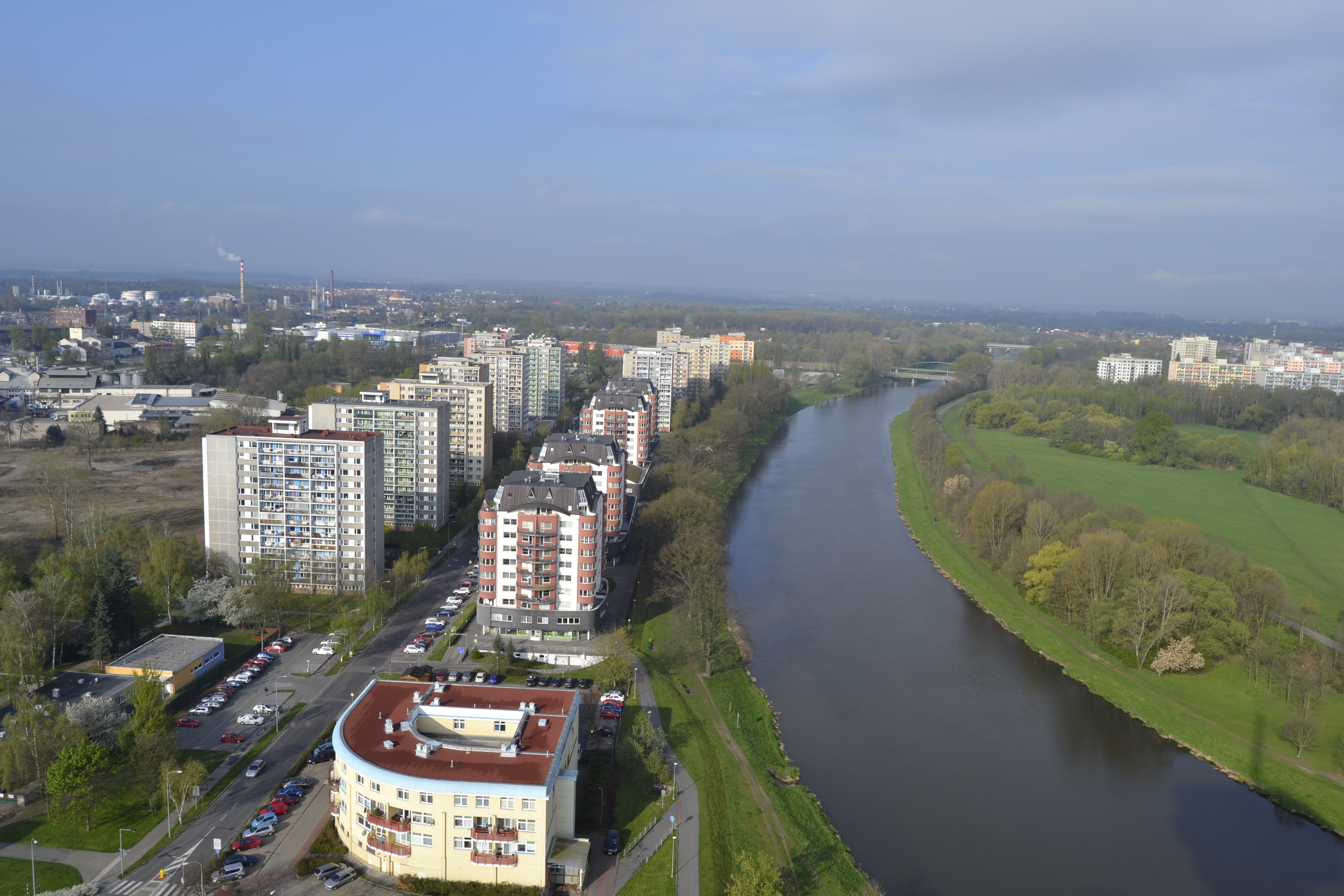
The Elbe River in Pardubice

Pardubice is located about 90 kilometres (56 mi) east of Prague. The city lies at the confluence of the Elbe and Chrudimka rivers. There are several fishponds, artificial lakes and oxbow lakes of the Elbe in the municipal territory.

Pardubice is located in a predominantly flat agricultural lansdscape in the East Elbe Table, in the eastern part of the Polabí lowland. The highest point is the hill Stropinský vrch at 258 m (846 ft) above sea level, located on the southeastern municipal border.

=== Climate ===
Pardubice's climate is classified as oceanic climate (Köppen: Cfb; Trewartha: Dobo). Among them, the annual average temperature is 9.7 °C (49.5 °F), the hottest month in July is 19.8 °C (67.6 °F), and the coldest month is −0.3 °C (31.5 °F) in January. The annual precipitation is 573.4 millimetres (22.57 in), of which July is the wettest with 79.9 millimetres (3.15 in), while February is the driest with only 30.9 millimetres (1.22 in). The extreme temperature throughout the year ranged from −27.7 °C (−17.9 °F) on 29 December 1996 to 39.8 °C (103.6 °F) on 4 August 2026.

Climate data for Pardubice Airport, 1991–2020 normals, extremes 1961–present
Month	Jan	Feb	Mar	Apr	May	Jun	Jul	Aug	Sep	Oct	Nov	Dec	Year
Record high °C (°F)	17.6 (63.7)	18.6 (65.5)	23.5 (74.3)	29.3 (84.7)	34.4 (93.9)	38.9 (102.0)	37.7 (99.9)	39.8 (103.6)	33.0 (91.4)	28.2 (82.8)	19.6 (67.3)	17.8 (64.0)	37.7 (99.9)
Mean daily maximum °C (°F)	2.6 (36.7)	4.7 (40.5)	9.4 (48.9)	15.7 (60.3)	20.3 (68.5)	23.5 (74.3)	25.7 (78.3)	25.7 (78.3)	20.2 (68.4)	14.3 (57.7)	8.0 (46.4)	3.6 (38.5)	14.5 (58.1)
Daily mean °C (°F)	−0.3 (31.5)	0.9 (33.6)	4.5 (40.1)	9.7 (49.5)	14.5 (58.1)	18.1 (64.6)	19.8 (67.6)	19.4 (66.9)	14.4 (57.9)	9.4 (48.9)	4.8 (40.6)	0.9 (33.6)	9.7 (49.5)
Mean daily minimum °C (°F)	−3.9 (25.0)	−3.2 (26.2)	−0.3 (31.5)	3.1 (37.6)	7.8 (46.0)	11.5 (52.7)	13.1 (55.6)	12.7 (54.9)	8.7 (47.7)	4.7 (40.5)	1.2 (34.2)	−2.5 (27.5)	4.4 (39.9)
Record low °C (°F)	−27.3 (−17.1)	−24.6 (−12.3)	−21.5 (−6.7)	−8.9 (16.0)	−3.4 (25.9)	−1.2 (29.8)	3.8 (38.8)	3.1 (37.6)	−3.5 (25.7)	−8.2 (17.2)	−16.0 (3.2)	−27.7 (−17.9)	−27.7 (−17.9)
Average precipitation mm (inches)	35.2 (1.39)	30.9 (1.22)	39.2 (1.54)	31.4 (1.24)	59.3 (2.33)	65.8 (2.59)	79.9 (3.15)	66.3 (2.61)	53.4 (2.10)	38.2 (1.50)	35.5 (1.40)	38.4 (1.51)	573.4 (22.57)
Average snowfall cm (inches)	11.7 (4.6)	7.7 (3.0)	3.2 (1.3)	0.3 (0.1)	0.0 (0.0)	0.0 (0.0)	0.0 (0.0)	0.0 (0.0)	0.0 (0.0)	trace	1.2 (0.5)	7.4 (2.9)	31.4 (12.4)
Average precipitation days (≥ 1.0 mm)	8.4	7.0	8.3	6.2	8.9	8.5	9.3	7.9	7.1	7.4	7.7	9.1	95.8
Average relative humidity (%)	84.2	79.9	74.8	68.3	68.8	69.4	68.6	69.7	76.2	81.6	84.9	85.1	76.0
Mean monthly sunshine hours	49.7	75.0	125.0	180.1	211.2	209.2	221.1	224.6	164.7	107.7	52.8	39.4	1,660.4
Source 1: NOAA
Source 2: Czech Hydrometeorological Institute

== History ==
Map of Pardubice (c. 1760)

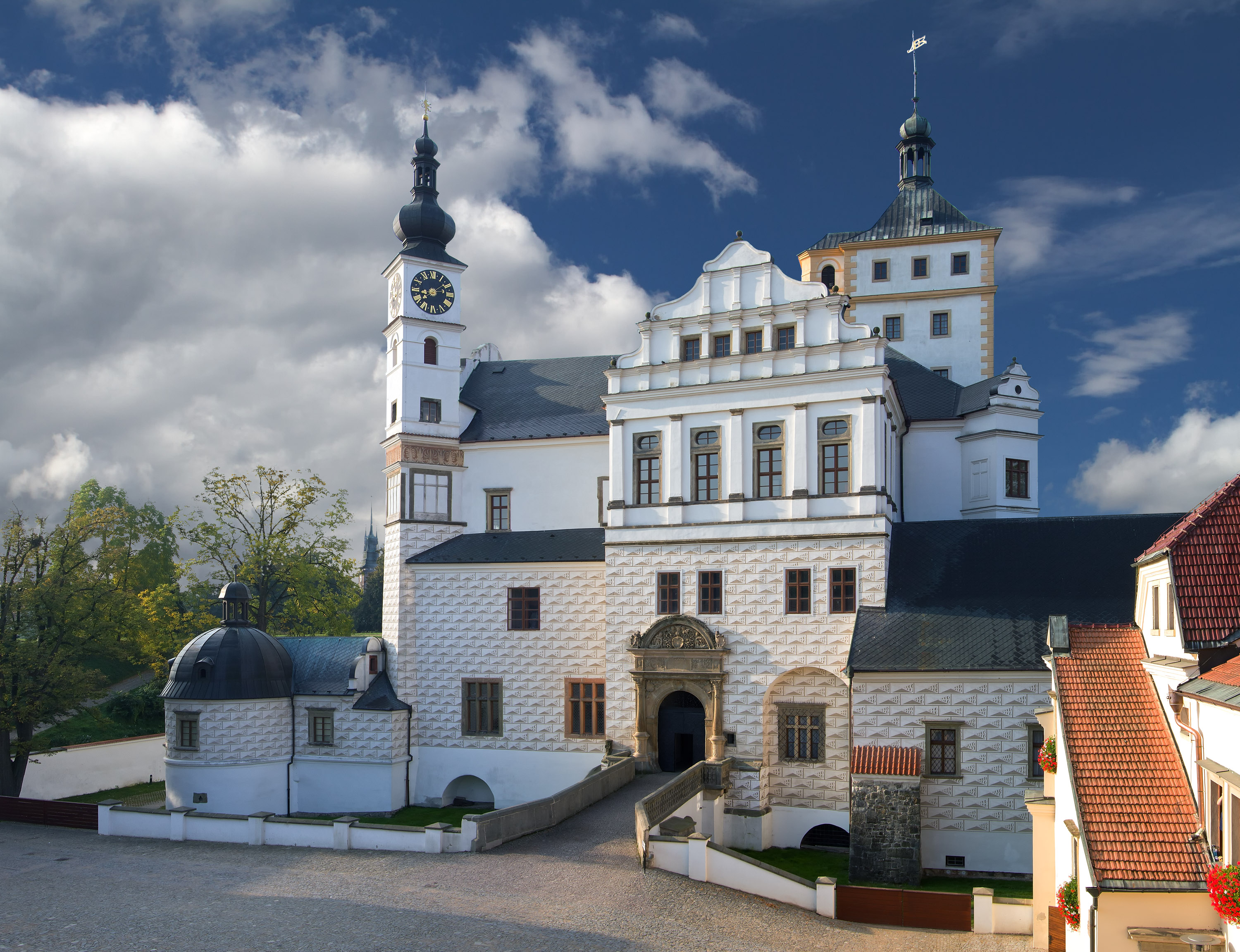
Pardubice Castle

The first written mention of Pardubice is from 1295, when Pope Boniface VIII took over the protection of the local Church of Saint Bartholomew with the order of Canons Regular of the Penitence of the Blessed Martyrs. In the first half of the 14th century, the settlement was acquired by a noble family, later known as Lords of Pardubice. In 1340, when Pardubice was inherited by Arnošt of Pardubice, it was first referred to as a city.

In 1491, Pardubice was bought by Vilém II of Pernštejn, who continued to expand the city and made a significant impact on its prosperity. He chose Pardubice as the centre of his estate, and began to build a city that corresponded to his status. The Pernštejn family had the entire historic centre, with the Renaissance square, built. They also had rebuilt the medieval castle into a comfortable fortified residence. In 1560, the Pernštejns were forced to sell the estate to Emperor Ferdinand I because of debts.

During the Thirty Years' War, the city was besieged by the army of General Lennart Torstensson, but was not conquered.

An important milestone in the history of the city was the year 1845, when the railway from Prague to Olomouc was completed. Pardubice became an important railway junction, which led to the development of the food, engineering and chemical industries, and subsequently the development of the city's social and cultural life. In 1874, the Velká pardubická steeplechase horse race was run for the first time. In 1910, in Pardubice, Jan Kašpar made the first successful flight in the Czech lands, and a year later he made history by making the first long-haul flight from Pardubice to Prague.

Until 1918, the city was part of Austria Hungary. The seat of the Pardubice district, it was one of the 94 Bezirkshauptmannschaften in Bohemia.

Pardubice continued to develop until the start of World War II. During the war, the city was damaged by Allied air strikes, and the Fanto Werke refinery was repeatedly bombed during the oil campaign.

== Demographics ==
Historical population

Year	Pop.	±%
1869	13,231	—
1880	16,281	+23.1%
1890	18,724	+15.0%
1900	25,214	+34.7%
1910	32,024	+27.0%

Year	Pop.	±%
1921	36,642	+14.4%
1930	42,220	+15.2%
1950	50,211	+18.9%
1961	65,240	+29.9%
1970	79,206	+21.4%

Year	Pop.	±%
1980	92,486	+16.8%
1991	94,610	+2.3%
2001	90,889	−3.9%
2011	90,767	−0.1%
2021	89,619	−1.3%

Source: Censuses

== Economy ==
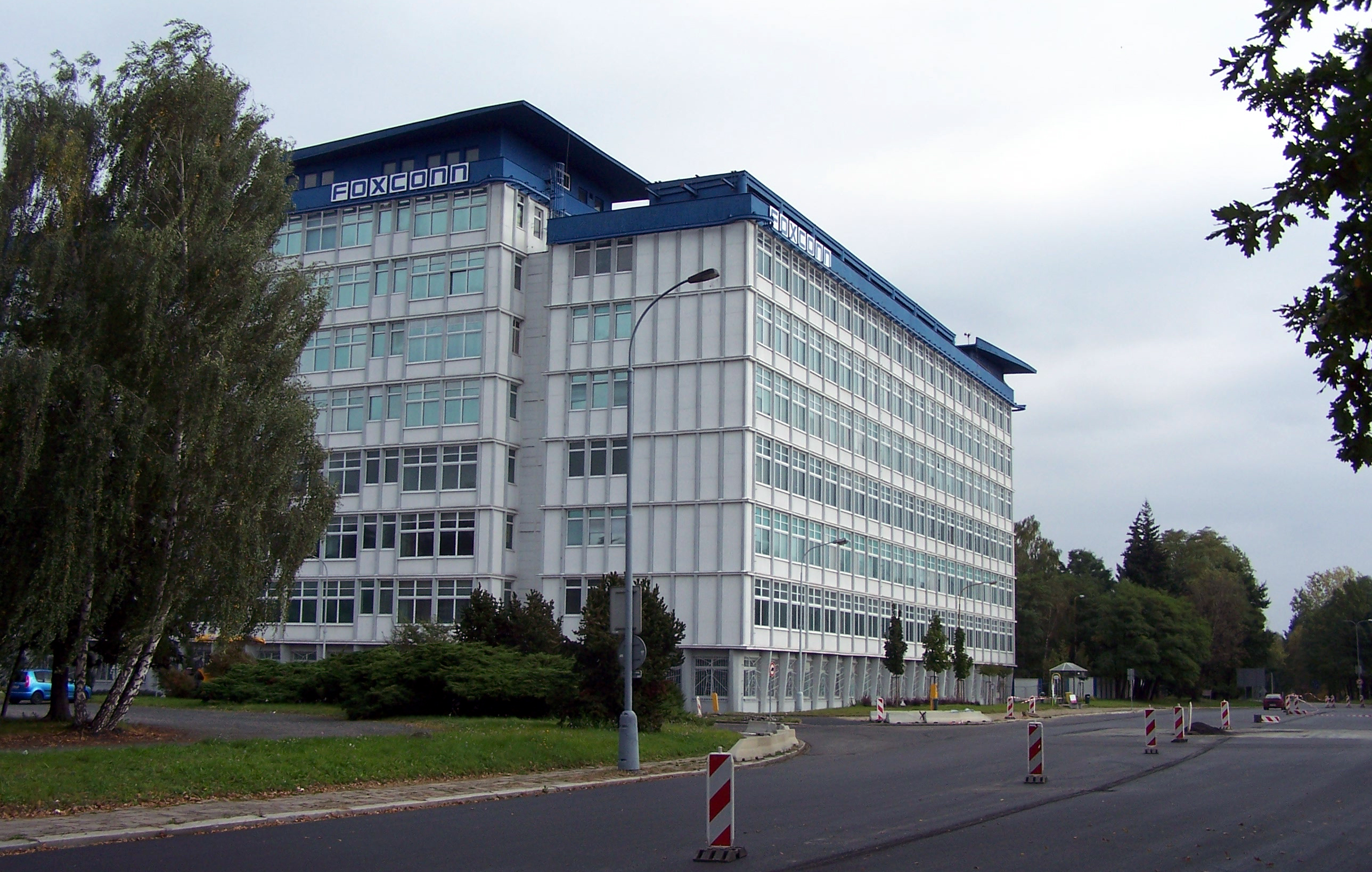
Foxconn Czech Republic

Pardubice is known as an industrial city. The dominant industries are chemicals, electrical engineering and mechanical engineering. Tesla operated here as an electronics manufacturer in 1921–1989. In 2000, Foxconn established a production plant in Tesla's former premises. This electronics manufacturer is the largest employer in Pardubice.

Pardubice has a long tradition in the chemical industry. This is represented by the Paramo refinery, which was founded by David Fanto in 1889. Today it is owned by Orlen Unipetrol. In Pardubice-Semtín there are the companies Explosia (a manufacturer of explosives founded in 1920, which is associated with the invention of Semtex plastic explosive) and its subsidiary Synthesia (manufacturer of cellulose, pigments and dyes, and organic compounds, established in 1929).

For centuries, Pardubice has been known for the production of gingerbread. The gingerbread guild was established in the 16th century. The first factory opened in 1913. Since 2008, Pardubice gingerbread has been a protected geographical indication of the European Union.

== Transport ==
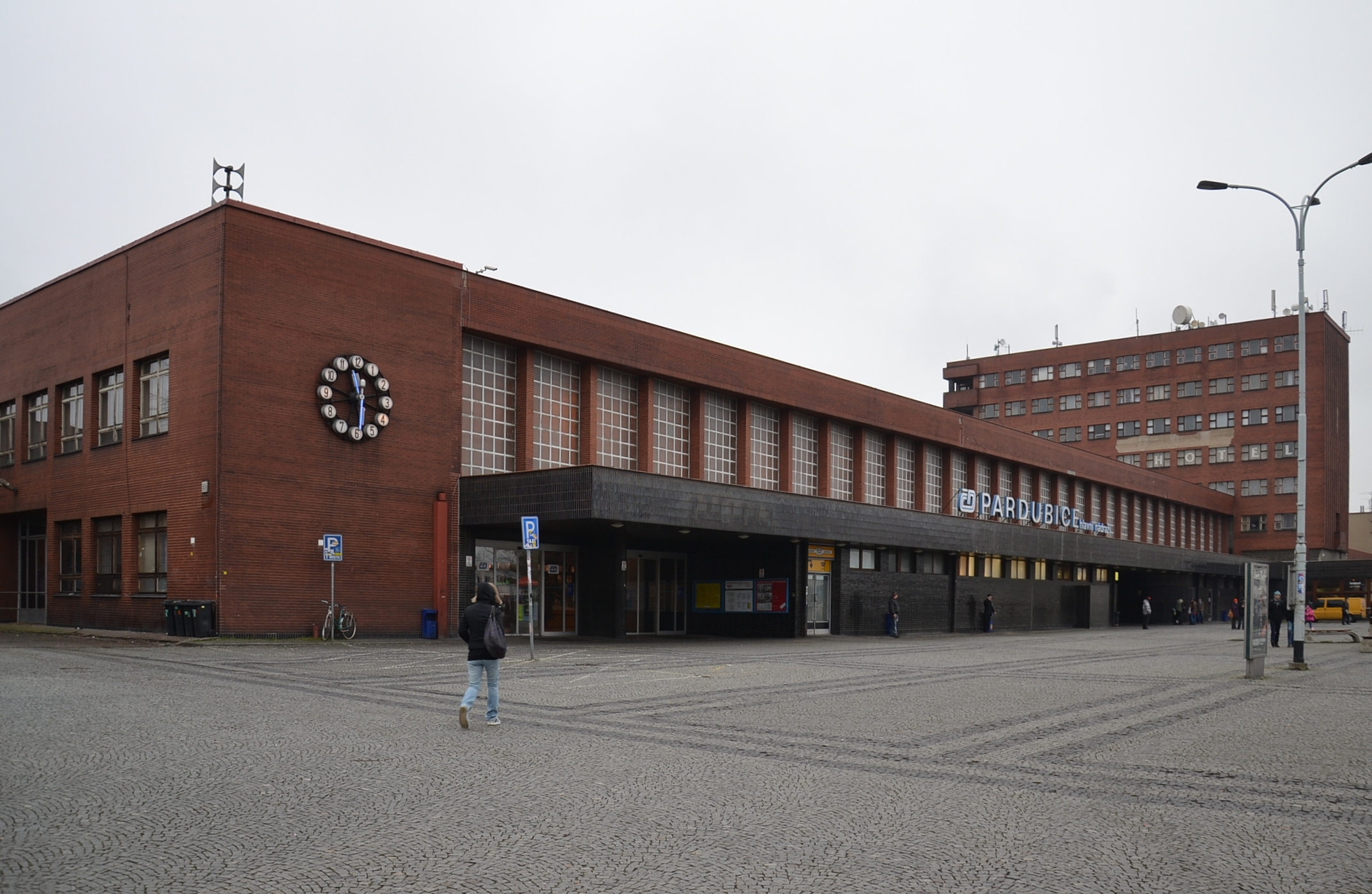
Pardubice hlavní nádraží railway station

Pardubice is located at the crossroads of three main roads: the I/2, which connects Pardubice with Prague; the I/36 from Pardubice to Rychnov nad Kněžnou District; and the I/37, which connects Hradec Králové with Žďár nad Sázavou and the D1 motorway.

The railway station Pardubice hlavní nádraží is an important junction. Pardubice has direct railway connections with many cities, including Prague, Brno, Olomouc, Ostrava and Liberec in the Czech Republic, Bratislava, Žilina and Košice in Slovakia, Wrocław, Kraków, Poznań, Gdańsk, Warsaw and Gdynia in Poland, Budapest in Hungary, and Vienna and Graz in Austria. The Pardubice area is served by eight train stations and stops.

Pardubice is served by Pardubice Airport, which is both a military and a civilian international airport.

In addition to buses, trolleybuses also provide transport within the city. The trolleybus service was started in 1952. There are 12 trolleybus lines in operation. City transport is provided by the company Dopravní podnik města Pardubic a.s., which is owned by the city of Pardubice. The company was founded in 1950.

== Education ==
Pardubice is home to the University of Pardubice. It was founded in 1950 as Chemical College and is mainly focused on fields historically associated with the city, such as the chemical industry and transportation.

== Sport ==
The city was first represented in the top national football competition by SK Pardubice in the 1930s and 1940s. From 1957 to 1960, Dukla Pardubice played in the top tier. Later VCHZ Pardubice played in the top national league in the 1968–69 season. Nowadays the city is represented by FK Pardubice, which plays in the Czech First League. The women's team plays in the Czech Women's First League.

The ice hockey club HC Dynamo Pardubice plays in the Czech Extraliga. The team plays its home games at the Enteria arena.

The basketball team is BK JIP Pardubice, playing in the National Basketball League.

The Pardubice Stallions are an American football team currently playing in the Czech League of American Football 2nd division. They play home games at the Summer Stadium.

Pardubice is also represented in the Czech rink bandy league.

Pardubice hosts two world-famous sporting events each year. The Velká pardubická steeplechase was first held in 1874 and is one of the most famous horse races in Europe. The second event is the Golden Helmet of Pardubice, a motorcycle speedway competition held at the Svítkov Stadium. The Golden Helmet has been run since 1929 and is one of the oldest individual titles in world speedway. AMK Zlatá Přilba Pardubice is a speedway team that race at the Svítkov Stadium.

The Czech Open international chess and games festival has been held in Pardubice since 1990. The city was also known for the Czech Open in golf, but it was last held in 2011.

== Sights ==
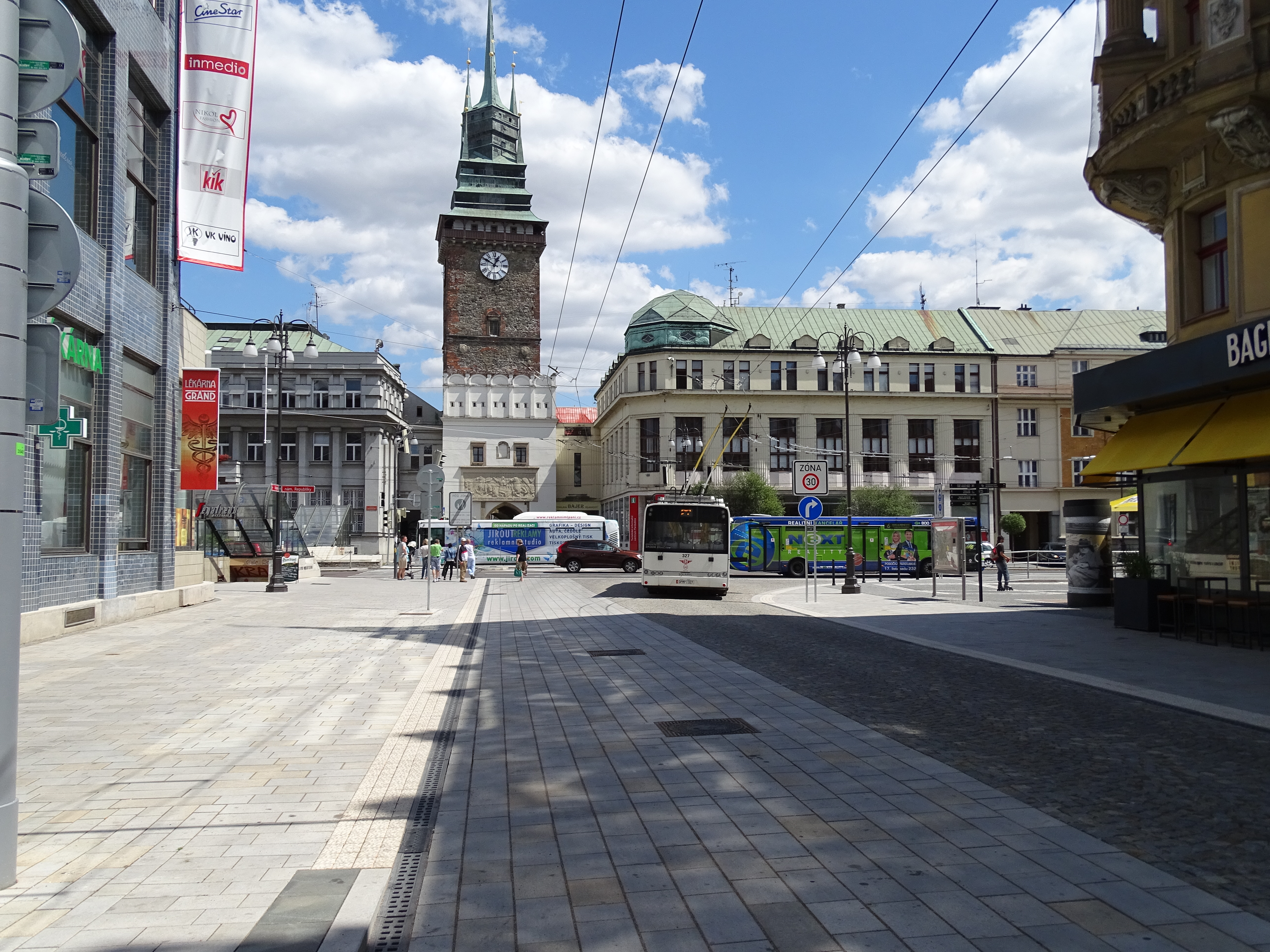
View towards the Green Gate

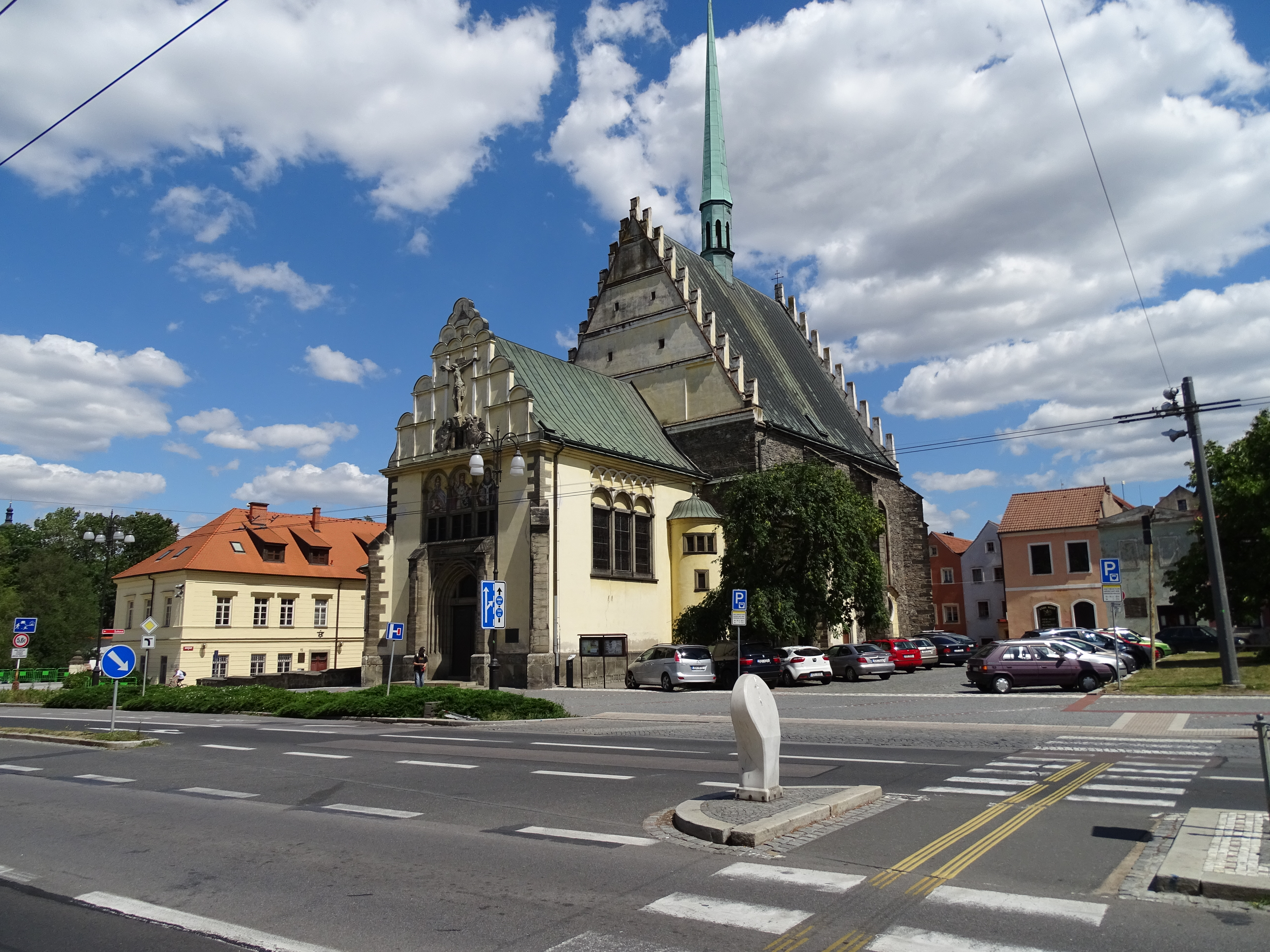
Church of Saint Bartholomew on the square Náměstí Republiky

=== City fortifications ===
Among the main landmarks and symbols of Pardubice is the Green Gate, a remnant of the city's fortifications. It is a Renaissance gate with a façade decorated by a relief designed by Mikoláš Aleš, which depicts the Lords of Pardubice. Behind the gate is a 60-metre-high (200 ft) tower that serves as a lookout tower. In its interior there is also an exposition with the history and legends of the city.

Pardubice Castle was built at the end of the 13th century, and was rebuilt in the Renaissance style at the turn of the 15th and 16th centuries. Massive fortifications are preserved around the castle. Today the castle houses the Museum of East Bohemia in Pardubice and the Gallery of East Bohemia in Pardubice. The castle has valuable architectural and artistic decorations of both interiors and exteriors, and is among the most valuable monuments in Pardubice, protected as one of five national cultural monuments in the city.

=== Ecclesiastical monuments ===
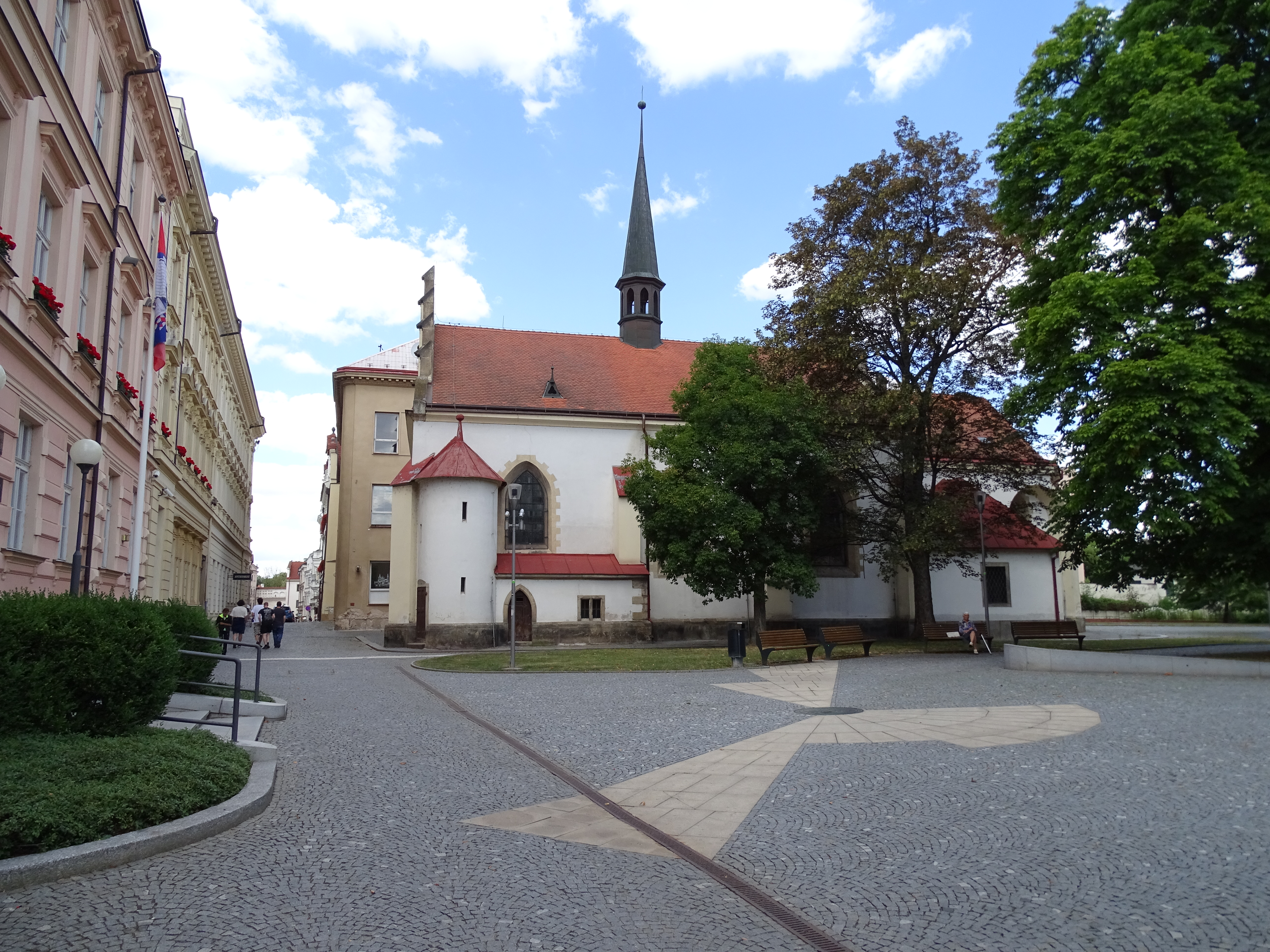
Church of the Annunciation of the Virgin Mary on Komenského náměstí

The original Church of Saint Bartholomew was built in 1295, but destroyed during the Hussite Wars. Today's Church of Saint Bartholomew was built together with a monastery in 1507–1514. It was used as a burial place of the Pernštejn family. In the interior there is a valuable main altar with the painting "The Passion of St. Bartholomew" from 1692 by Michael Willmann and a painted decoration by Mikoláš Aleš.

The Church of the Annunciation of the Virgin Mary was founded by Arnošt of Pardubice before 1359. Its present late Gothic and Renaissance appearance dates from the first half of the 16th century. Until 1786, the church belonged to a Minorite monastery. There are extensive underground tombs from that era under the church.

=== Other ===
The House at Jonáš is one of the most treasured burgher houses in Pardubice. It was built after the fire that hit the city in 1507. It is known for its façade, decorated with a stucco relief from 1797, showing a biblical scene of a whale swallowing the prophet Jonah. The premises of the house are used by the Gallery of East Bohemia in Pardubice.

Pardubice Crematorium was built in 1921–1923 as the first crematorium in the Czech lands. It was built in the Rondocubist style according to the design by the architect Pavel Janák, and is protected as a national cultural monument.

Another national cultural monument is the set of Winternitz automatic mills. They were built over a period between 1909 and 1926 according to the design of the architect Josef Gočár. The large building with the mills is also an example of Rondocubism.

The Zámeček Memorial is a place of reverence that commemorates the execution of 194 people in 1942, including the inhabitants of Ležáky (soon after the destruction of Lidice by the Nazis). The place is a national cultural monument, and at its centrepiece is a granite monument dating from 1949.

The last of the five national cultural monuments in Pardubice is the Larisch Villa, located near the Zámeček reverent area. It was built in the Romantic style in 1884 for Count Jiří Larisch. During World War II, the villa housed the Nazi Schutzpolizei, and the residents of Ležáky were imprisoned there.

== Notable people ==
- Gustav Gärtner (1855–1937), pathologist
- Božena Viková-Kunětická (1862–1934), politician, writer and feminist
- František Lexa (1876–1960), Egyptologist
- Vilém Mathesius (1882–1945), linguist and writer
- Jan Kašpar (1883–1927), aviator and aircraft constructor
- Emil Artur Longen (1885–1936), playwright, actor and screenwriter
- Oskar Brázda (1887–1977), painter
- Věra Vovsová (1912–1998), painter; lived here
- Jan Tauc (1922–2010), Czech-American physicist
- Petr Haničinec (1930–2007), actor
- Jiří Gruša (1938–2011), poet, prose writer and translator
- Vladimír Nadrchal (born 1938), ice hockey player
- Alois Švehlík (born 1939), actor
- Petr Kabeš (1941–2005), poet
- Stanislav Prýl (1942–2015), ice hockey player
- Jiří Crha (born 1950), ice hockey player
- Otakar Janecký (born 1960), ice hockey player and coach
- Hynek Kmoníček (born 1962), diplomat
- Ivo Křen (1964–2020), graphic artist and glass art theoretician
- Roman Prymula (born 1964), physician, epidemiologist and politician
- Dominik Hašek (born 1965), ice hockey player
- Edita Adlerová (born 1971), mezzo-soprano
- Tereza Maxová (born 1971), model
- Radek Baborák (born 1976), French horn player and conductor
- Nora Fridrichová (born 1977), television presenter
- Lukáš Wagenknecht (born 1978), economist and politician
- Jan Bulis (born 1978), ice hockey player
- Jiří Welsch (born 1980), basketball player
- Michal Meduna (born 1981), footballer
- Aleš Hemský (born 1983), ice hockey player
- Filip Bandžak (born 1983), opera singer, baritone
- Iva Kramperová (born 1984), classical violinist
- Tomáš Nosek (born 1992), ice hockey player
- Kovy (born 1996), youtuber
- Filip Zadina (born 1999), ice hockey player

== Twin towns – sister cities ==
Pardubice is twinned with:

- Bełchatów, Poland
- Çanakkale, Turkey
- Doetinchem, Netherlands
- Merano, Italy
- Pernik, Bulgaria
- Rosignano Marittimo, Italy
- Selb, Germany
- Skellefteå, Sweden
- Vysoké Tatry, Slovakia
- Zhytomyr, Ukraine

=== Cooperation agreements ===
Pardubice also cooperates with:

- East Lothian, Scotland, United Kingdom
- Golegã, Portugal
- Jerez de la Frontera, Spain
- Sežana, Slovenia
- Waregem, Belgium
- Wrocław, Poland
