= Karl Koller =

Karl Koller may refer to:

- Karl Koller (ophthalmologist) (or Carl Koller, 1857–1944), Austrian ophthalmologist
- Karl Koller (general) (1898–1951), German Luftwaffe general
- Karl Koller (footballer) (1929–2009), Austrian football player
