= Ivo Křen =

Czech artist

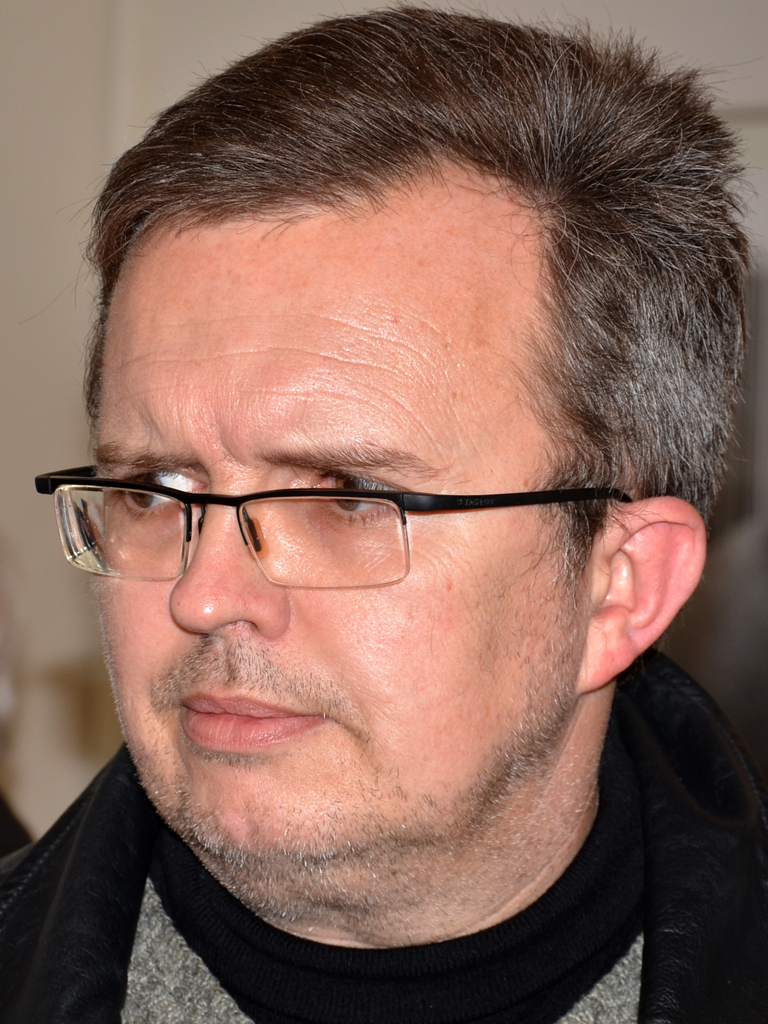
- Ivo Křen (2014)
- Born: 6 February 1964; Pardubice, Czechoslovakia
- Died: 9 May 2020 (aged 56); Pardubice, Czech Republic
- Education: Faculty of Pedagogics, University of Hradec Králové
- Known for: printmaker, art glass theoretician, curator
- Awards: Graphics of the Year (2003, 2011), Award of the Association of Czech Graphic Artists Hollar (2013)

Ivo Křen (6 February 1964 – 9 May 2020) was a Czech graphic artist, art glass theoretician and curator.

== Life ==
After graduating from grammar school in Pardubice (1979–82) Ivo Křen studied art education and Czech language at the Faculty of Pedagogics, University of Hradec Králové, under Prof. Bořivoj Borovský. He briefly worked as a teacher and then worked at the East Bohemian Gallery and since 1989 at the East Bohemian Museum in Pardubice.

He was a member of the Association of Czech Graphic Artists Hollar, the Rubikon art group and the Academy of Design of the Czech Republic. He has exhibited independently since 1991 and presented his graphic works at many joint exhibitions around the world.

He was associated with the graphic artists of the middle generation of the Association of Czech Graphic Artists HOLLAR in Prague and received awards for his work using a multi-coloured linocut technique.

As the organizer of the permanent exhibition Czech Glass of the 20th Century and curator of the art and industrial collections of the East Bohemian Museum in Pardubice (1992), he managed the collection of studio glass. He worked as an art glass theoretician. Ivo Křen was a founding member, curator of exhibitions and author of texts of Rubikon Group (1998), a group of prominent Czech glassmakers. With the Rubikon group, he has presented his work in Germany, Austria, Iceland, France, Belgium and Italy.

Ivo Křen lived and worked in Pardubice. He died on 9 May 2020 at the age of 56.

== Work ==
"It's worth to me to be amazed and be charmed by trivia. To seek, to observe, to surprise and to entertain myself. To enjoy the fact that many things, formerly completely overlooked in the headlong rush for the ever new and strange, still remain ready to be discovered."

Ivo Křen's graphic work specialised in the linocut technique, which since 2008 he sometimes combined with a monotype base. His first linocuts (1988) were illustrations for Vladimír Holan's poetic composition A Night with Hamlet, where in his figurative compositions he made use of raw unpolishedness, hatching, dramatic contrast of black and white lines and massive dark surfaces.

However, he soon began to explore the technical possibilities of this graphic technique - from the illusion of volume by engraved lines and textures, through flat and monochromatic shapes, to the possibility of creating pasty chiaroscuro layers in print with subsurface transparencies of colour that emerge from the surface as a perceptible relief element. He mastered the technique of multi-coloured linocut, where colour is a carrier of meaning and part of the expression of all sensory perceptions and emotional connections. Linocut allows him a sweeping gesture of colour and the alternation of surfaces with minute details of structures, blending monumentality with fragility.

The lengthy process of engraving on a large format matrix allows for a contemplative approach to the work and a continuous transformation of the original motif in the creative process as well as an exploration of new technical possibilities of expression.

In the early 1990s, with the transition to multi-coloured prints, his interest gradually shifted from figurative work to natural compositions of rocks, walls and labyrinths or interior details, where he explored the possibilities of perspective and image depth or the effect of lights and shadows. The compositions are generously conceived, devoid of details, with a clear emotional charge.

The second half of the 1990s is characterised by a painterly approach to reality, flat expressive colour and fine details, the combination of many hues of a single colour in the resulting juxtaposition and a transition to abstracted forms.

A frequent motif is the intimate recesses of gardens, in a figurative sense the recesses of the soul, the mystery of the unknowable and an expression of the subjective search for balance and order.

As a graphic designer Ivo Křen was involved in the creation of posters and typographic design of book publications of the Rubikon Group and some small occasional prints.

=== Representation in collections ===
- State Museum, Majdanek, Poland
- Cremona Civic Museum – Prints Cabinet, Cremona, Italy
- Museum Narodowe, Warsaw, Poland
- National Museum, Kraków, Poland
- Stadt Weiden, Regionalbibliothek, Weiden, Germany
- Schio Municipal Collection, Schio, Italy
- Ministry of Foreign Affairs of the Czech Republic, Prague
- Gallery Klatovy – Klenová
- Regional Gallery Liberec
- Art Gallery Karlovy Vary
- East Bohemian Gallery in Pardubice
- Forbo linoleum BV, Prague
- Town Museum and Gallery Polička
- Municipal Library in Prague
- Cabinet Ex libris, Chrudim

== Gallery ==
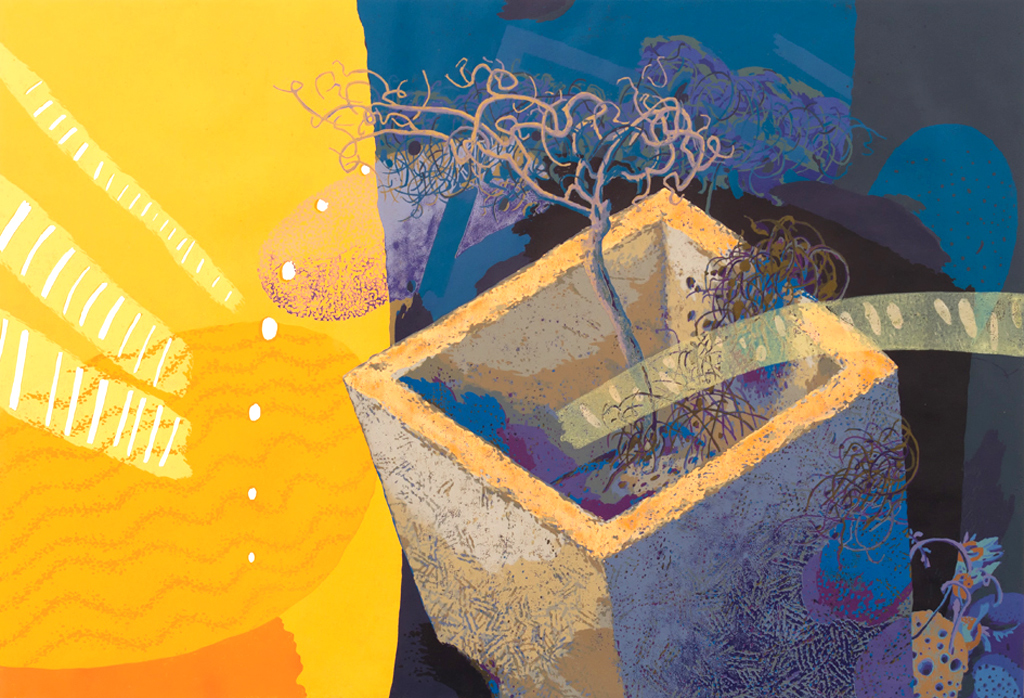
Ivo Křen, The Secret Garden, 1998

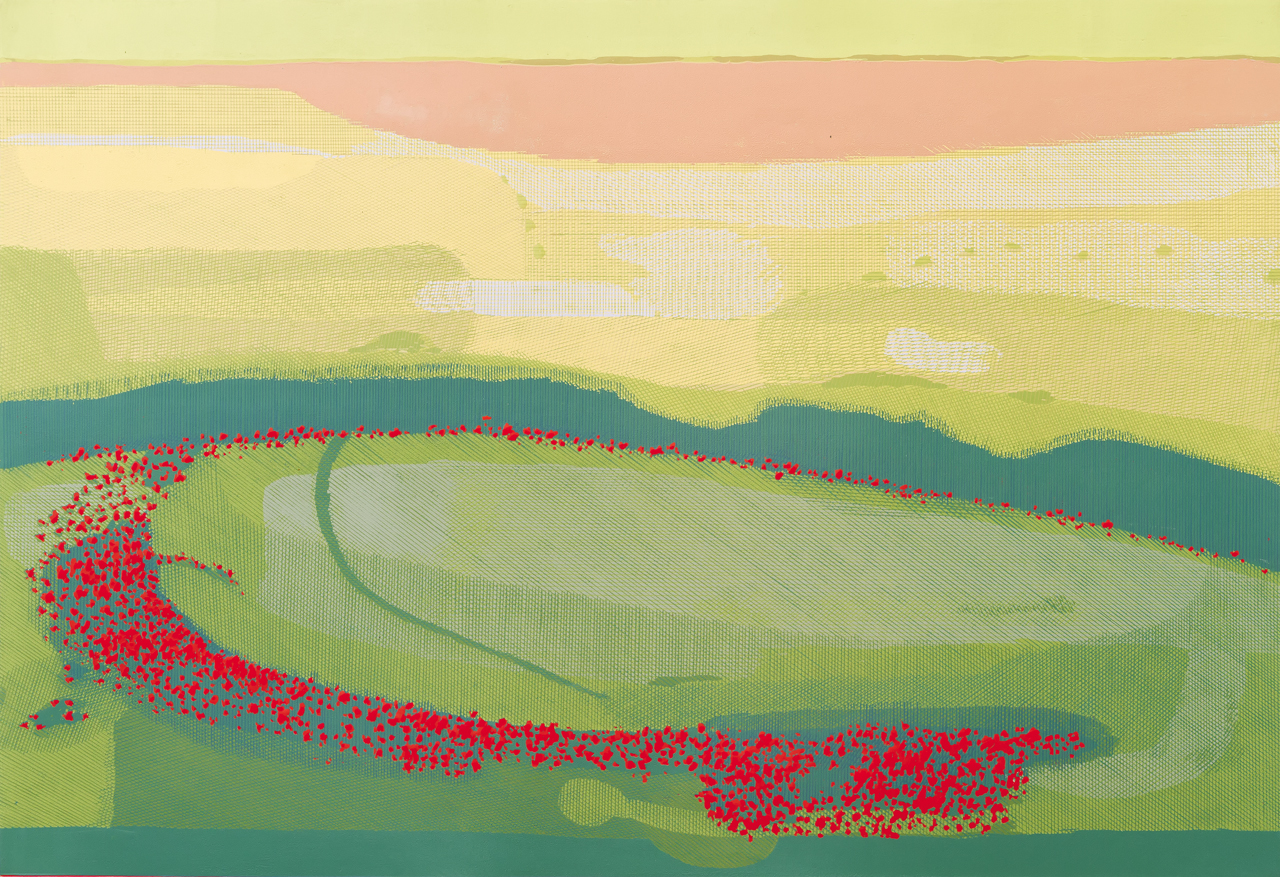
Ivo Křen, Red Poppies II, 2010

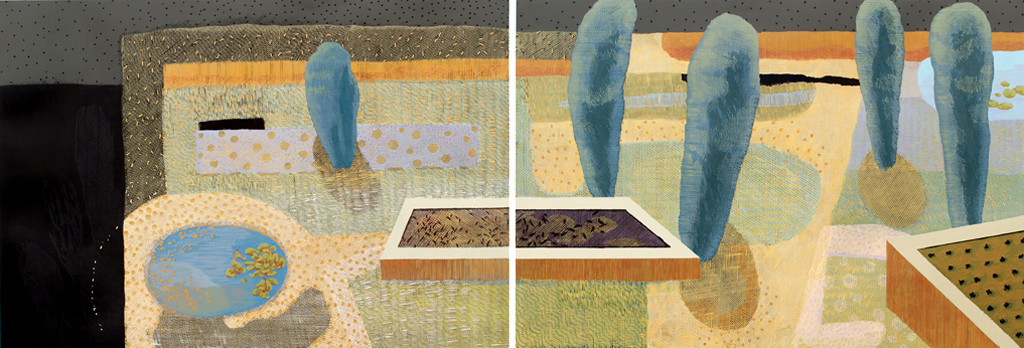
Ivo Křen, diptych At the end of the garden 1,2, 2011

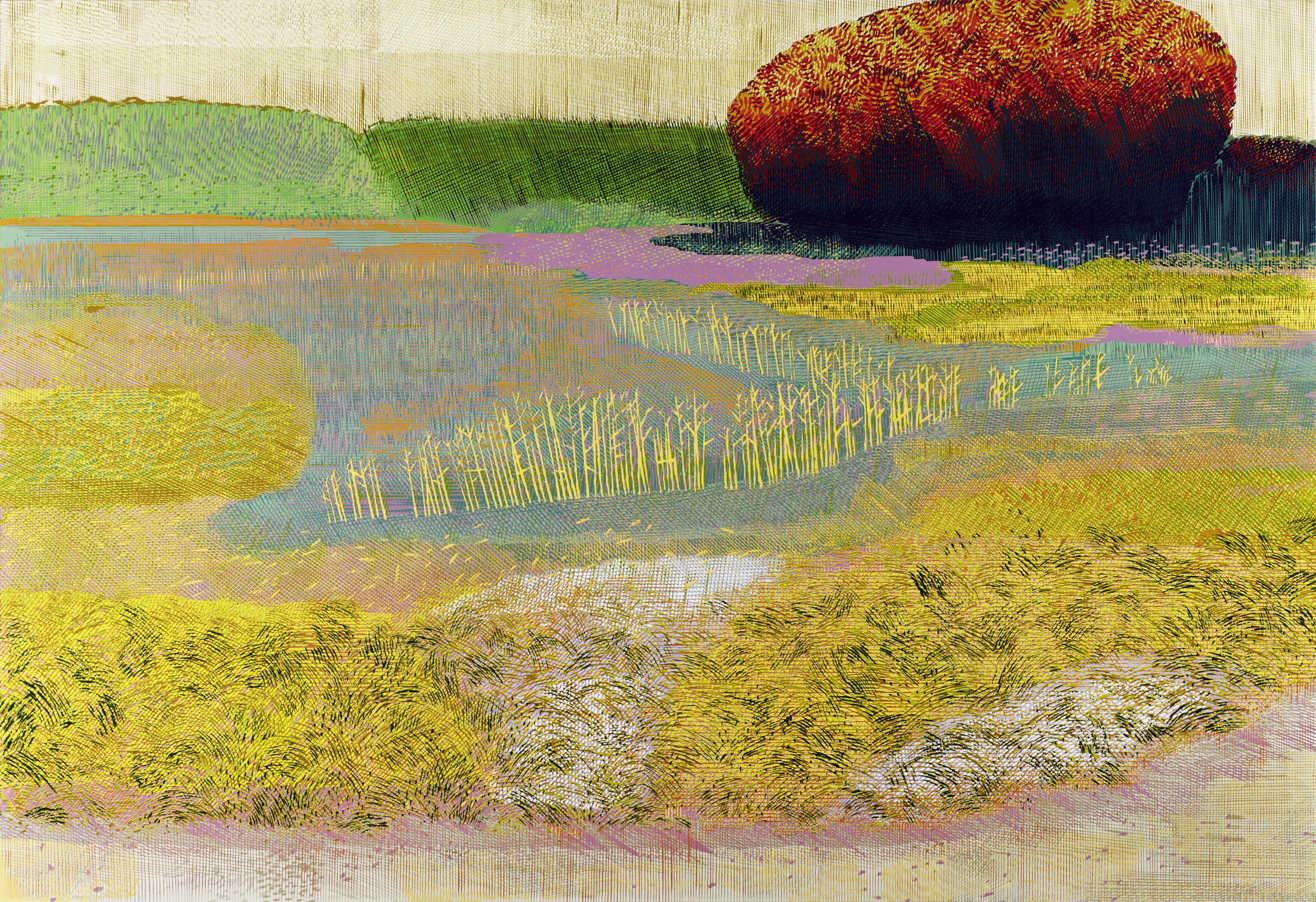
Ivo Křen, Sumac and Reed, linocut 65 x 95 cm, consecutive print in 28 colours, 2012

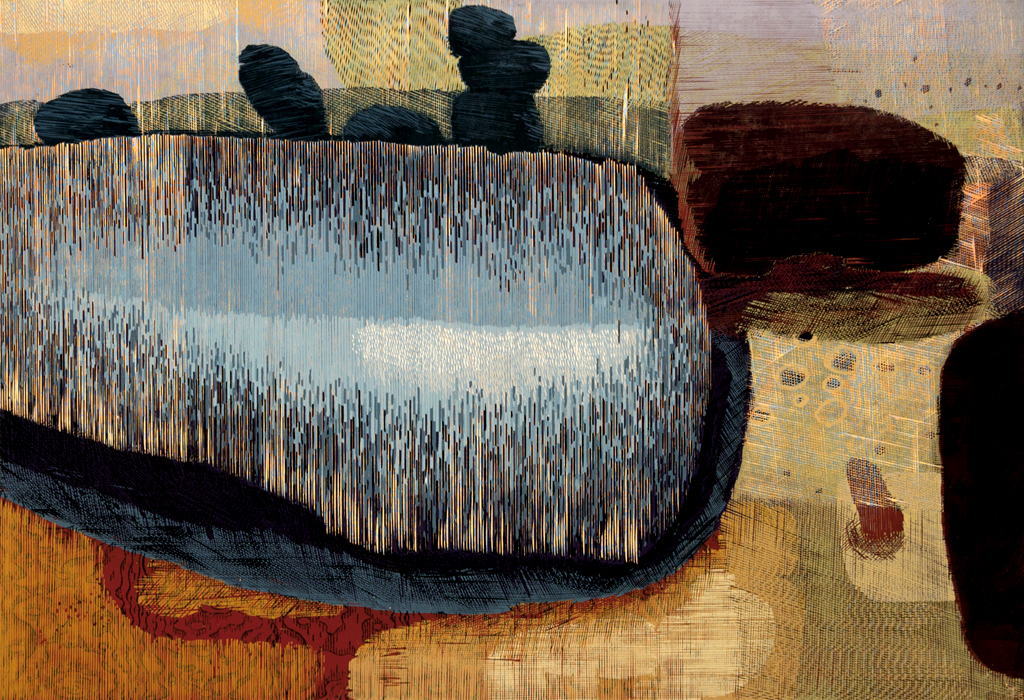
Ivo Křen, Dangerous Lake, Iceland, 2013

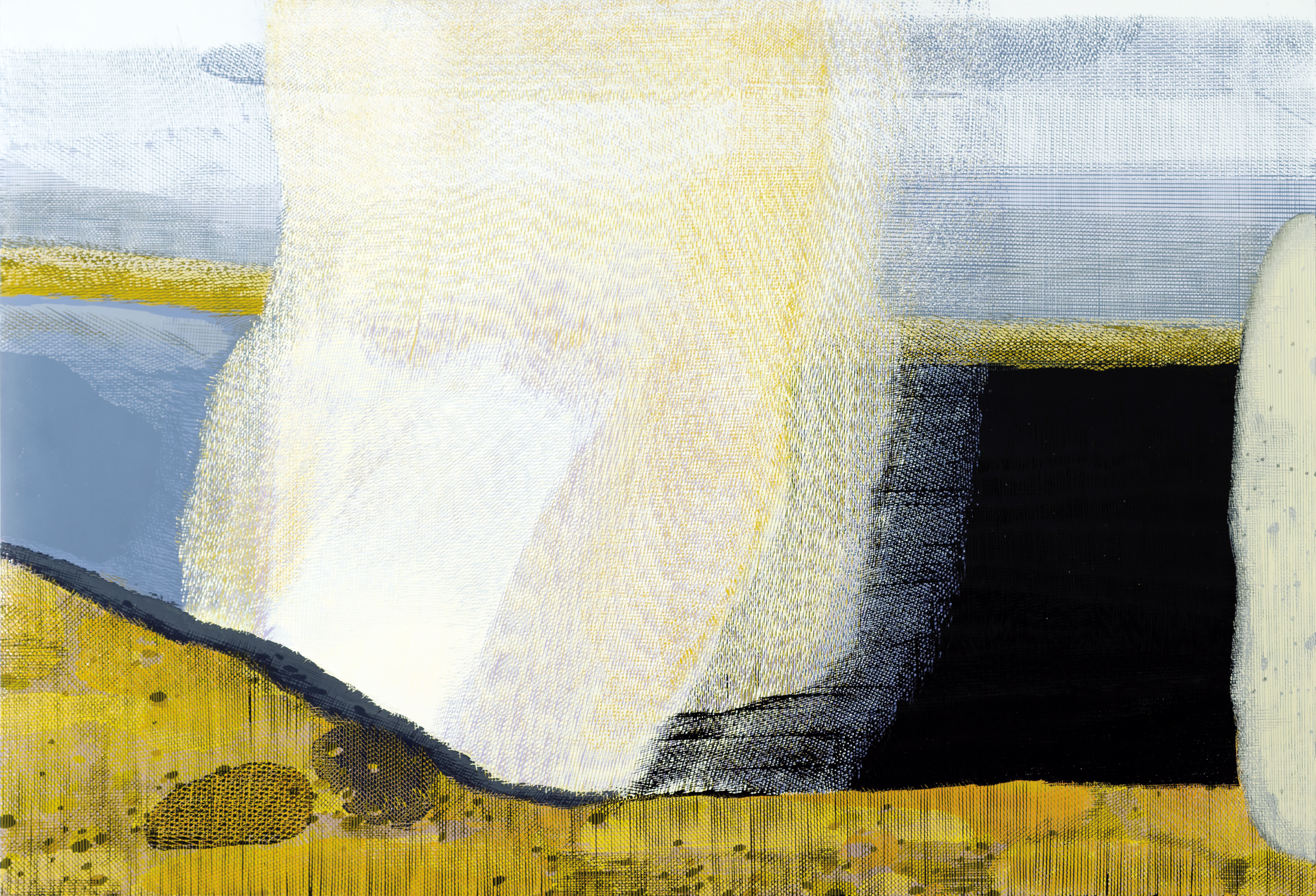
Ivo Křen, Above the Waterfall - Iceland, linocut 65 x 95 cm, consecutive print in 23 colours, 2014

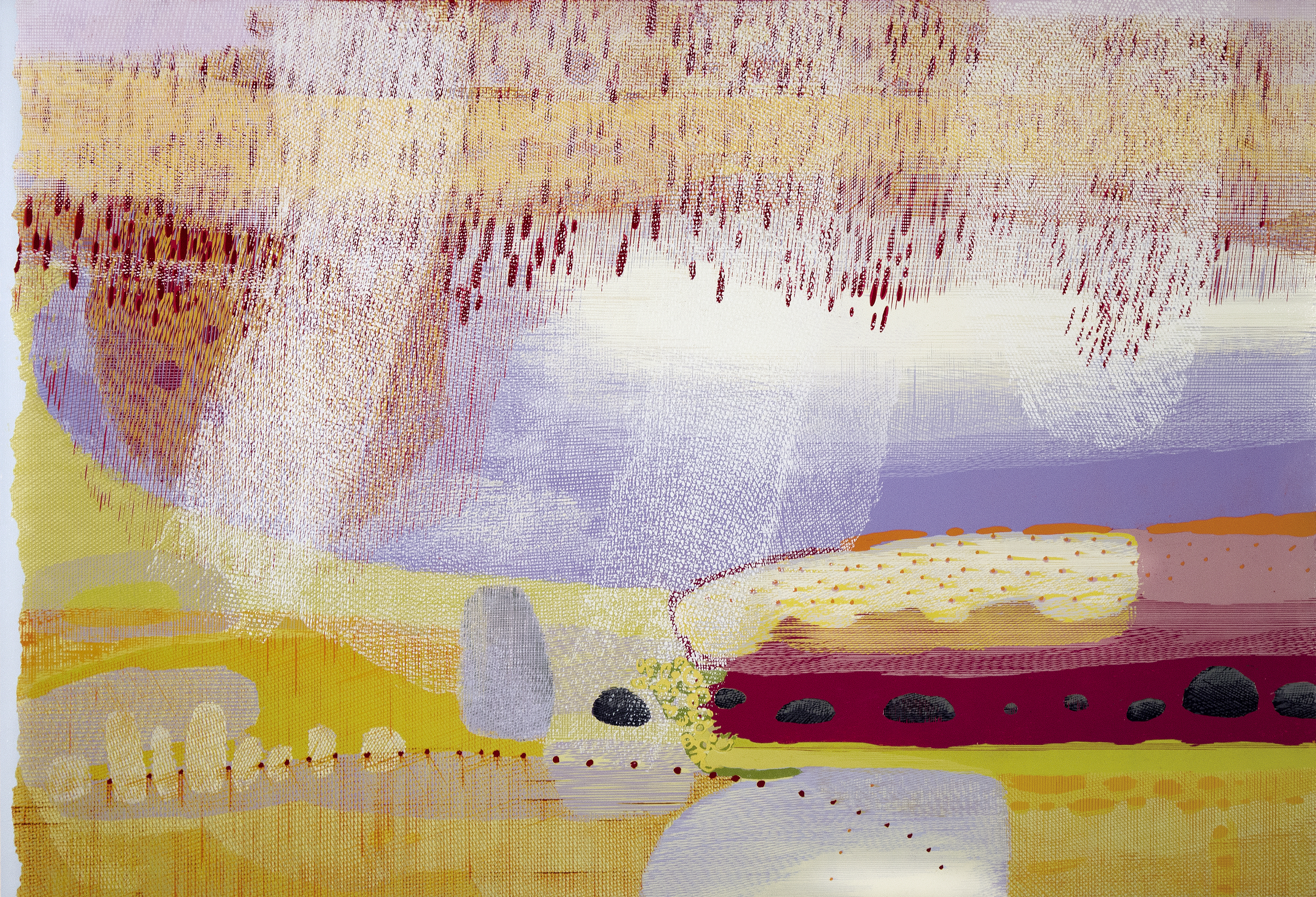
Ivo Křen, Summer Rain, linocut 65 x 95 cm, consecutive print in 27 colours, 2014

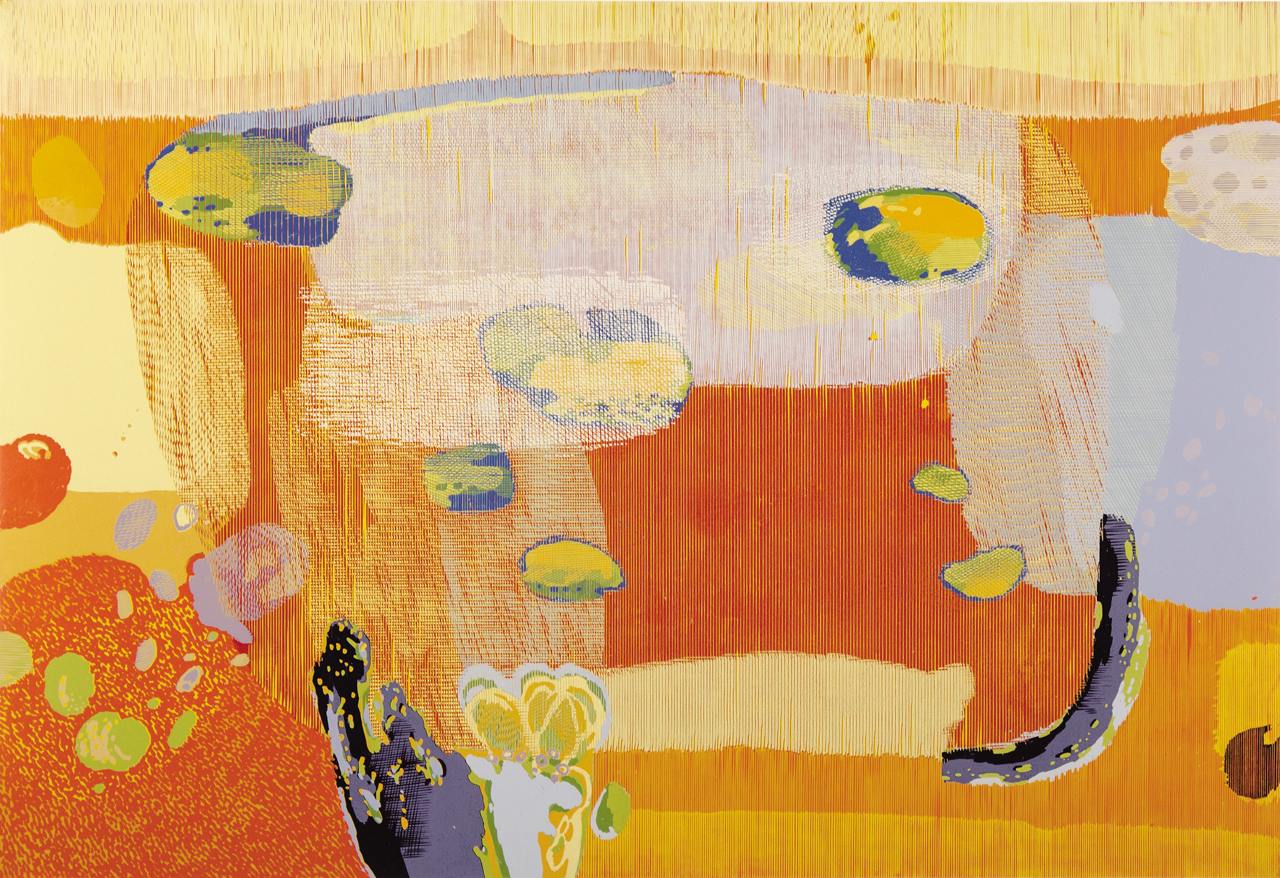
Ivo Křen, Landscape in the noonday heat, 2016

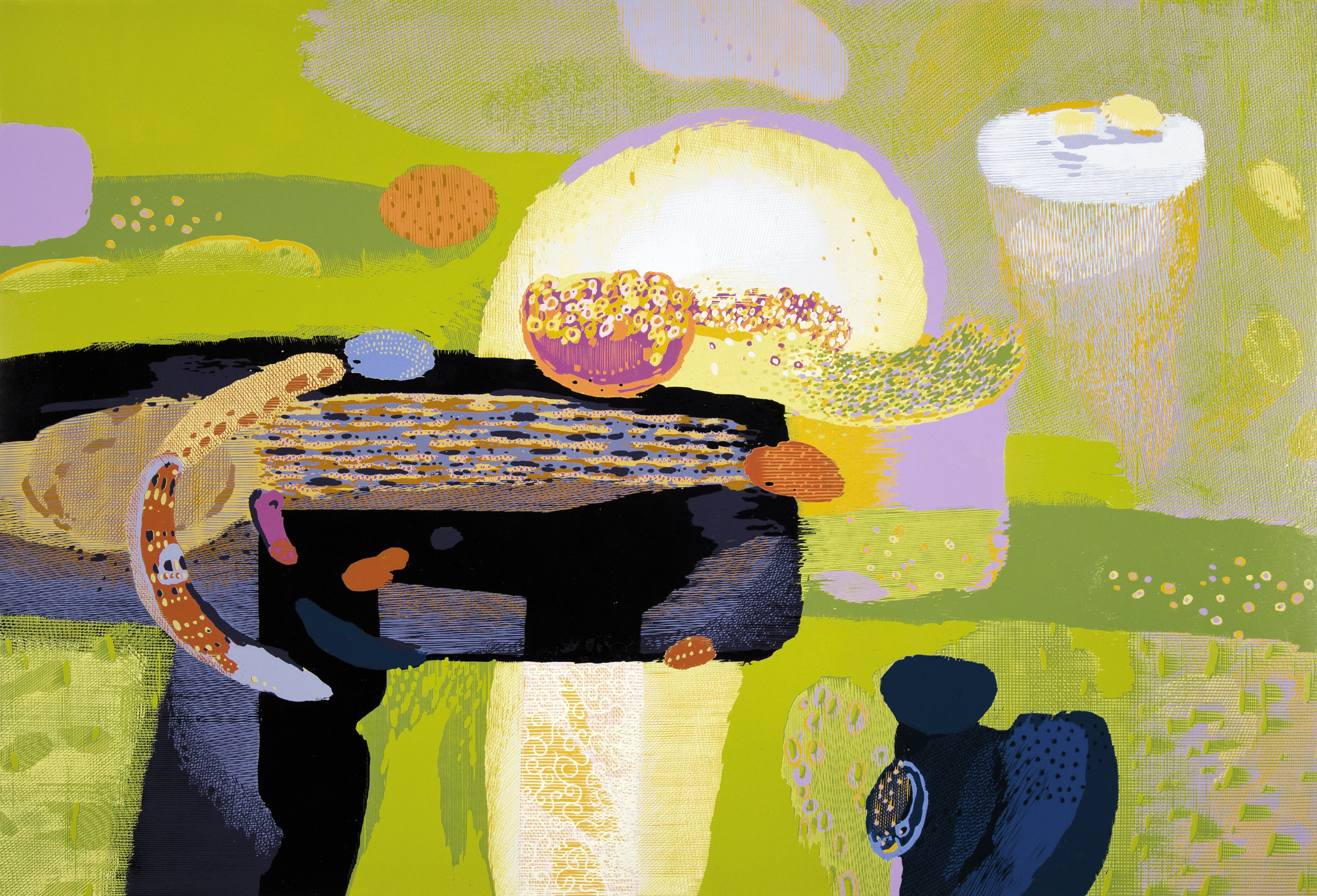
Ivo Křen, Summer full of scents, linocut 65 x 95 cm, consecutive print in 24 colours, 2017

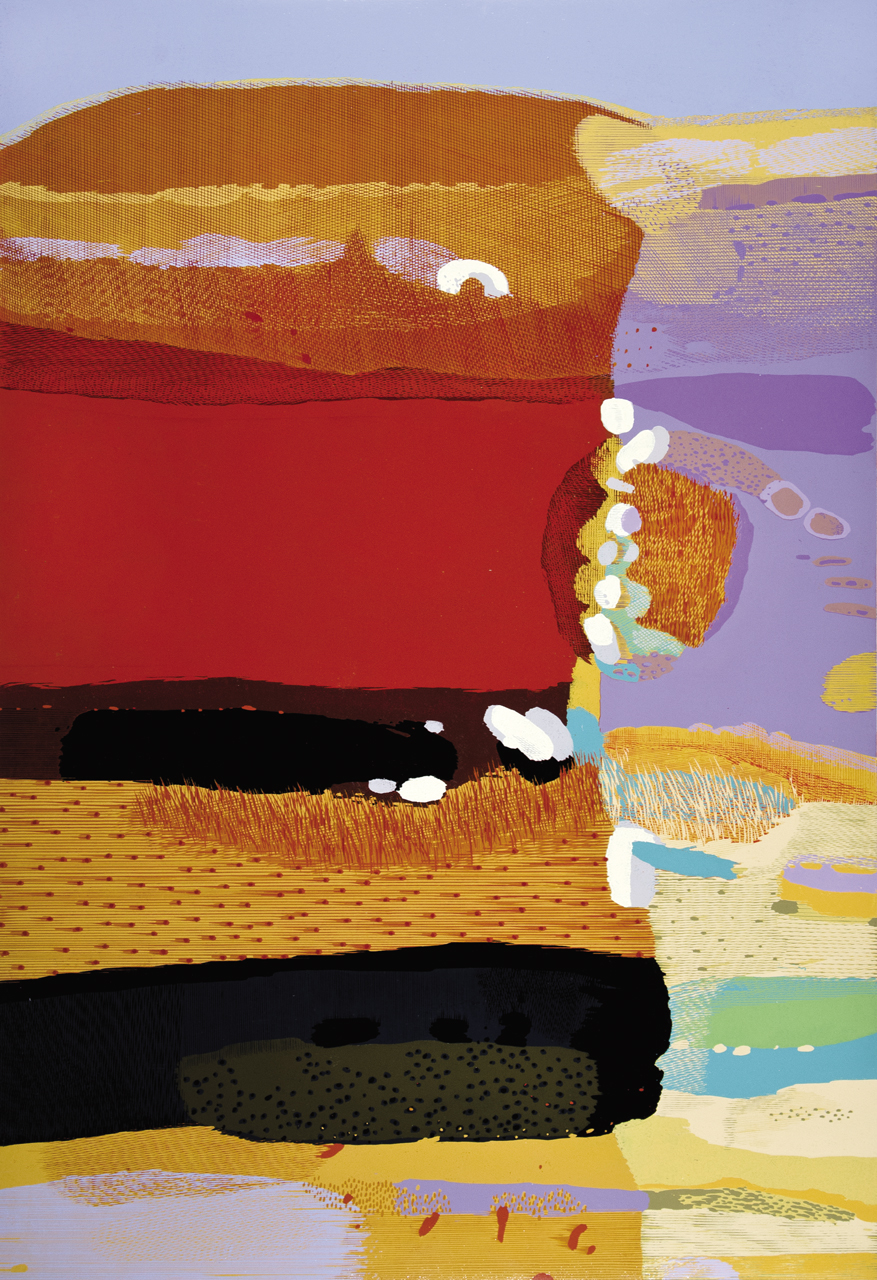
Ivo Křen, Red grass, 2017

== Sources ==
=== Author's catalogues ===
- Ivo Křen: Grafika / Prints, text B. Vachudová, Gallery of the University of Pardubice 2016-2017
- Ivo Křen: Linocuts, 2014, B. Vachudová, GU Karlovy Vary, graphic design by P. Vlček, cat. 60 p., 200 copies, printed by the author, ISBN 978-80-260-6975-1
- Ivo Křen : Carpe diem (linocuts), 2011, Kroupová M, OGL, GUKV, graphic design by P. Vlček, cat. 69 p., 250 copies, printed by the author, Pardubice, ISBN 978-80-260-0250-5

=== Curator texts ===
- Ivo Křen: Czech glass: studio glassmaking : permanent exhibition, 2006, 80 p., East Bohemian Museum in Pardubice, ISBN 80-86046-91-5
- Ivo Křen: České sklo: collection of studio glass art and design of the East Bohemian Museum in Pardubice, 2016, 160 p., East Bohemian Museum in Pardubice, ISBN 978-80-87151-42-6

=== Catalogues and publications ===
- Rubikon, Katalog zur Jubiläumsausstellung 30+10=40 Jahre Glasmuseum Frauenau, tx. tx., graphic design by Křen I., cat. 68 p., Glasmuseum Frauenau
- Bohumil Eliáš Jr., Glass, paintings, 2013, tx., graph. ed. Křen. I., cat. 80 p., courtesy of the author
- Convergence J.Žertová, Vl. Kopecký, 2013, tx., graphic arrangement Křen I, cat. 28 p., VČG and VČM in Pardubice, ISBN 978-80-85112-74-0
- Bohumil Eliáš jr, Glass, painting, 2013, Křen I, author's catalogue, courtesy of the author
- Tomáš Hlavička, glass 1997–2009, 2010, Křen I, aut. catalogue, courtesy of the author
- Bohumil Eliáš, 2009, Křen I, monogr. 280 p., Aspekt Gallery, Brno
- Rubikon Group, 2008, Křen I, cat. for the exhibition in KGVU in Zlín, published by Rubikon Group
- Rubikon group 2003: Eliáš, Matouš, Exnar, Rybák, Křen, 2003, tx., graphic arrangement Křen I, cat. 85 p., Eng., Fr., German, Rubikon, Prague, ISBN 80-239-0458-2
- Jaromír Rybák - Creatures from the bestiary, 2001, Křen I, cat. 40 p., no., English, VČM Pardubice, published by the author, ISBN 80-86046-51-6
- Rubicon: Eliáš, Exnar, Rybák, Matouš, 1998, Křen I, cat. 40 p., VČM Pardubice, ISBN 80-85112-21-3
