= Filip Bandžak =

Czech opera singer

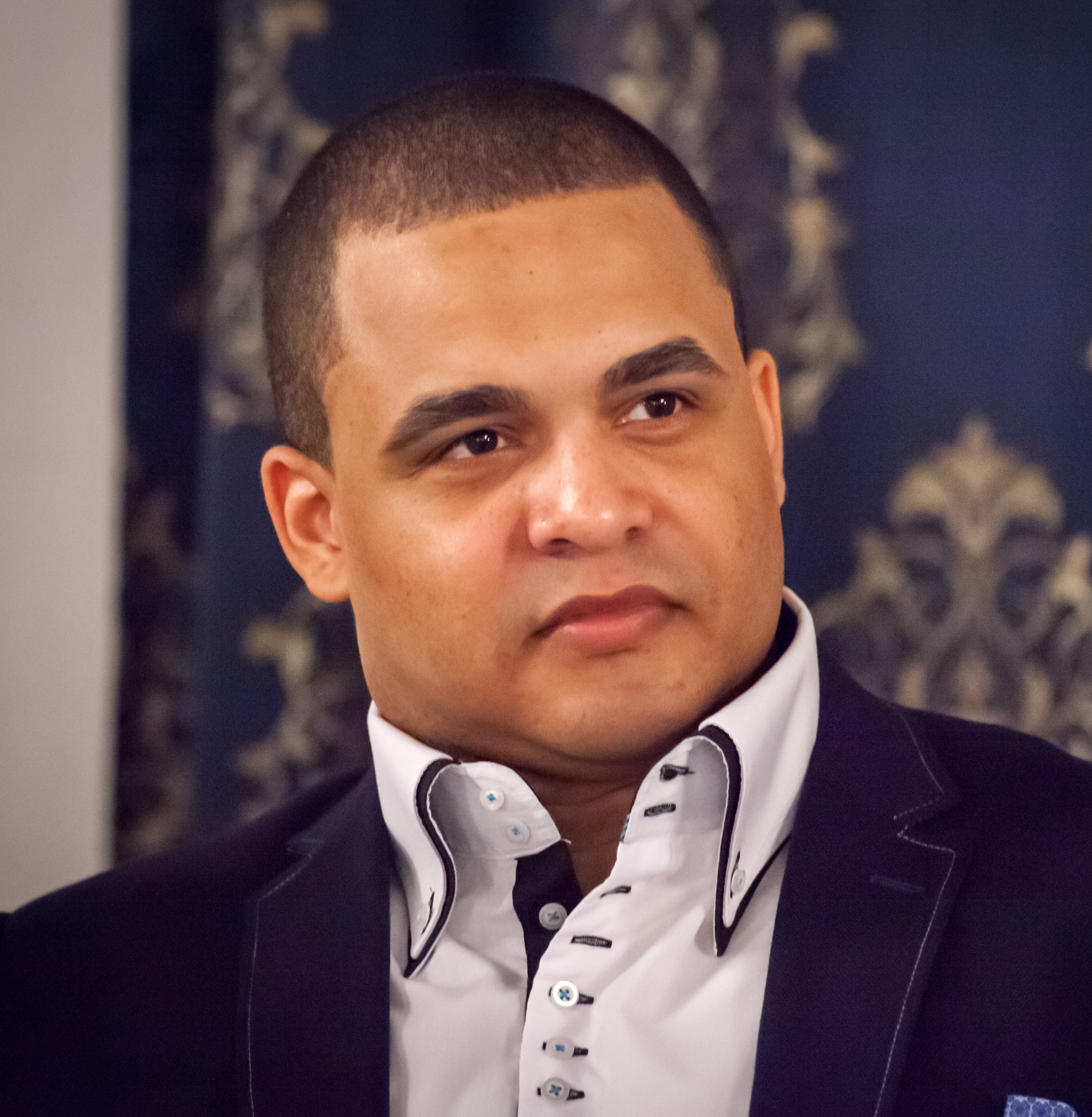
- Born: 10 September 1983 (age 43); Pardubice, Czechoslovakia
- Occupations: Operatic baritone, artist
- Years active: 1993–
- Website: www.filipbandzak.com

Filip Bandžak (Czech: [ˈfɪlɪb ˈbandʒak]; born 10 September 1983) is a Czech operatic baritone.

== Biography and career ==
Bandžak was born in Pardubice, Czech Republic. His musical career began very early when he moved to Prague. At the age of four he started playing the violin and attended drama classes at the Folk School of Art. In 1992 he became a member of the Prague Philharmonic Children's Choir. Already by the age of 11, Filip made his first professional appearance on the opera stage by performing in the role of the Page in G. Verdi's Rigoletto in the Prague National Theatre. His debut he made on the stage of the Prague State Opera as Marcello in Puccini's La bohème.

After his first appearance on to the international vocal scene which was held by performing the title role in Hans Krása's children's opera Brundibár in 1993, Bandžak decided to study at the music faculty of the Russian Academy of Theatre Arts in Moscow (GITIS). He passed the entrance exams successfully and received a presidential scholarship for the whole period of his studies. In GITIS he studied both drama (acting) under the tuition of Rozetta Nemchinskaya and opera singing under the tuition of Svetlana Varguzova and the soloist of the Bolshoi Theatre in Moscow, baritone Yuri Vedeneyev.

After finishing studies in Moscow he started to cooperate closely with operatic bass, People's Artist of the USSR, Austrian Kammersänger Evgeni Nesterenko. At the same time Bandžak studied at the Western Bohemian University where he earned a Master's degree in psychology and culture of music. Bandžak made appearances at renowned international vocal competitions and music festivals. In November 2006 he won the first prize at the Czech International Vocal Competition of Antonín Dvořák in Karlovy Vary.

In October 2008 he took part in the China International Vocal Competition (CIVC) in Ningbo. He was the only European laureate and was honoured with the award for an outstanding interpretation of a Chinese song in Chinese language. In May 2009 he became a laureate of the 35th Maria Callas Competition Gran Prix in Athens, Greece. In June 2010 Bandžak also became a laureate of the First International F. I. Shalyapin Competition in Plyos, Russia. In the same year he became the only European participant of the Harbin International music festival in China. He has also performed at Tallinn Opera festival, Bártok+ International Music festival in Hungarian Miskolc. He has appeared in such venues as Megaron the Athens Concert Hall, Moscow International House of Music, Budapest Béla Bartók National Concert Hall, Prague's Rudolfinum. In November 2013 during the gala concert to support treatment of cancer in children in Dvořák Hall, Rudolfinum, Bandžak received the award for opera of the European Union of Arts, the Golden Europea.

He is particuraly known for his interpretational versatility and bright voice with a velvety timbre.

== Filmography ==
- The Devil's Bride (Čertova nevěsta), in the role of the Sultan – 2011

== Awards and honors ==
- Golden Europea – 2014
