= Jan Kašpar =

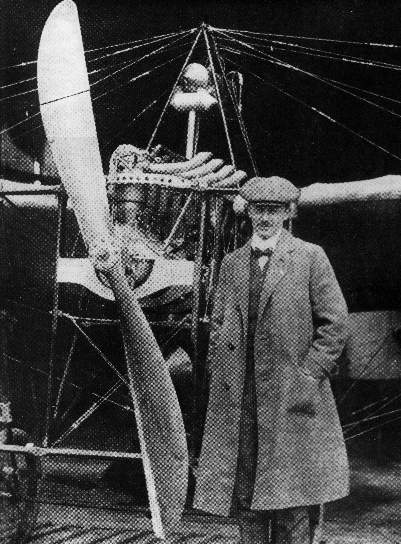
Jan Kašpar

Jan Kašpar (20 May 1883 – 2 March 1927) was a Czech aviator, aircraft constructor, designer and engineer. He is considered an aviation pioneer in the Czech lands.

== Biography ==
Kašpar was born at Pardubice. From his early years, he was an enthusiastic fan of cycling and automobilism. After finishing his studies at secondary school in Pardubice, he moved to Prague. In 1907, Kašpar graduated at the Czech Technical University in Prague. Later, he continued his studies in Germany where he concentrated on aircraft engine construction. Following that, he worked as a builder in the Laurin & Klement factory. Together with his colleague, engineer Otto Hieronimus, Kašpar participated in construction of the first aircraft engine in the Czech lands. His passion for aviation forced him to leave the company where, together with his cousin Evžen Čihák, he devoted himself solely to aircraft construction.

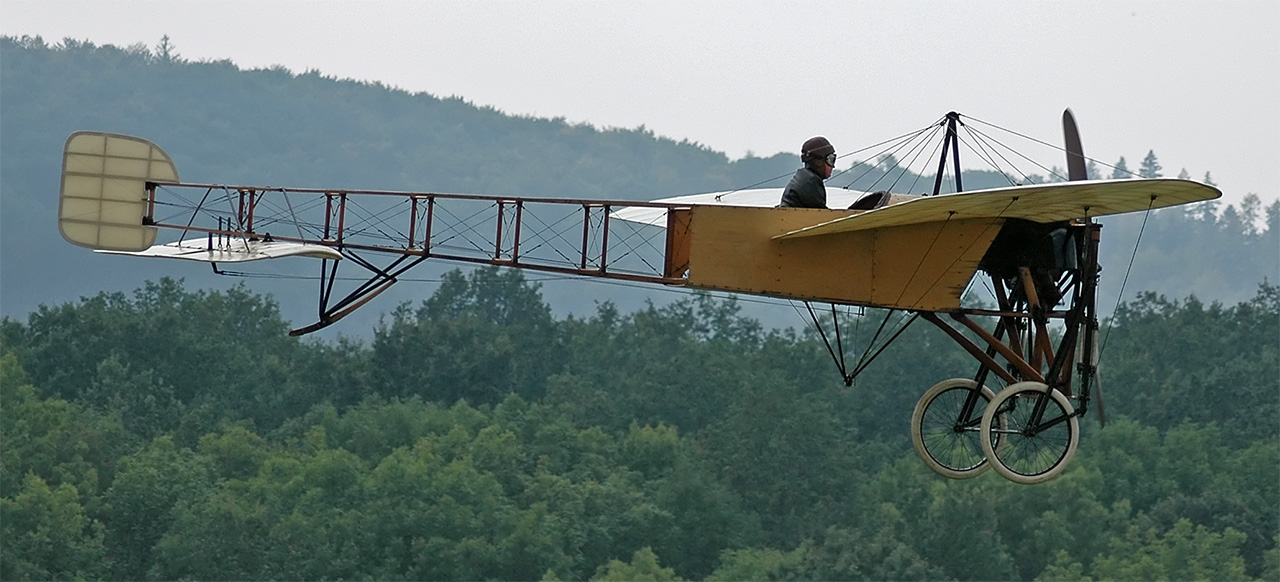
Blériot XI.

His first attempts to construct a monoplane were inspired by the model Antoinette by the French designer Hubert Latham. In 1909, during the construction of his own monoplane, Kašpar heard about Blériot's successful flight from Calais to Dover. Kašpar had completed his own aircraft, but he was unable to take off. Some of his first attempts nearly cost him his life. He decided to buy a Blériot XI (No. 76) by the French manufacturer. At first, he equipped the Blériot XI with his own engine, but later switched to an engine made by Anzani.

On 16 April 1910, Kašpar made his first successful flight with the Blériot XI. The flight covered two kilometres at a height 20–25 metres. This day became a celebrated milestone in Czech aviation because of the flight and Kašpar being the first pilot of Czech nationality. Despite this, Kašpar was not the first person to fly these relatively new inventions in the Czech lands. In January 1910, French pilot Gaubert flew over the aerodrome in the Velká Chuchle district of Prague. German aviator Otto Hieronimus, the chief engineer at Laurin & Klement, undertook his flight two weeks before Kašpar's.

A year later, in 1911, Kašpar managed to construct his own functional aircraft which he called JK. With this aircraft, he planned to embark on the first long-haul flight in the Czech lands. The first test flight took place on 30 April 1911, from Pardubice to Chrudim and back. The same day Kašpar also made the first flight with a passenger, his cousin Čihák. Kašpar's most famous flight took place on 13 May 1911. Departing Pardubice to Velká Chuchle (121 km) the flight lasted 92 minutes. At that time, it was the longest flight in the Austro-Hungarian Empire. Kašpar later donated the aircraft which he had flown for that historical flight to the National Technical Museum in Prague where it remains today.

Kašpar's later years were marked by personal tragedy and financial hardship. Following World War I he lost his financial resources and fell into poverty. In 1927, impoverished and suffering from mental illness, Jan Kašpar committed suicide in Pardubice.
