= Gustav Gärtner =

Austrian pathologist

Gustav Gärtner (September 28, 1855 – November 4, 1937) was an Austrian pathologist born in Pardubice, Bohemia.

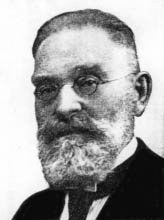
Gustav Gärtner

In 1879 he earned his doctorate from the University of Vienna, afterwards working in Vienna as an assistant to Salomon Stricker (1834–1898), and later as an associate professor (1890). In 1918 he became a "full professor" at the University of Vienna.

In Vienna he conducted scientific studies of kidney functions, experiments dealing with electrical skin resistance and research involving innervation of vessels of the brain. Also, he worked with Carl Koller (1857–1944) involving experiments on the use of cocaine as an anaesthetic in eye surgery.

Gärtner is credited with the creation of a number of medical devices and apparati; one of his better known inventions being a tonometer that contained an inflatable finger cuff for measurement of blood pressure. He developed the eryostat, an electric machine to support adipositas therapy.

He also made contributions in the study of nutrition, mainly in the field of dietetics. The principles of the "Gaertner diet" were propagated in his book Diätetische Entfettungskuren.

== Written works ==
- Ueber die therapeutische Verwendung der Muskelarbeit und einen neuen Apparat zu ihrer Dosirung, Wien, Im Selbstverlag des Verfassers, 1887. Offprint from Allgemeine Wiener medizinische Zeitung, 1887.
- Über den Hirnkreislauf. Vorläufige Mitteilung. 1887. By Julius Wagner-Jauregg (1857-1940) and Gustav Gärtner
- Ueber den elektrischen Widerstand des menschlichen Körpers gegenüber Inductions-strömen, Wien, A. Hölder, 1889. 529 pages.
- Ueber einen neuen Blutdruckmesser (Tonometer). Vortrag, gehalten am 16. Juni 1899 in der k.k. Gesellschaft der Aerzte in Wien, von Gustav Gartner. Wien, M. Perles, 1899. Offprint from Wiener Medicinische Wochenschrift, 1899, 49, No. 30.
- Ueber einen neuen Apparat zur Bestimmung des Hämoglobingehaltes im Blute, München, J. F. Lehmann, 1901. 14 pages. Offprint from Münchener medicinische Wochenschrift, 1901, No. 50.
- Diätetische Entfettungskuren. Leipzig 1913. Translated into English.
