= Pardubice Crematorium =

Crematorium in the Czech Republic

- Krematorium Pardubice
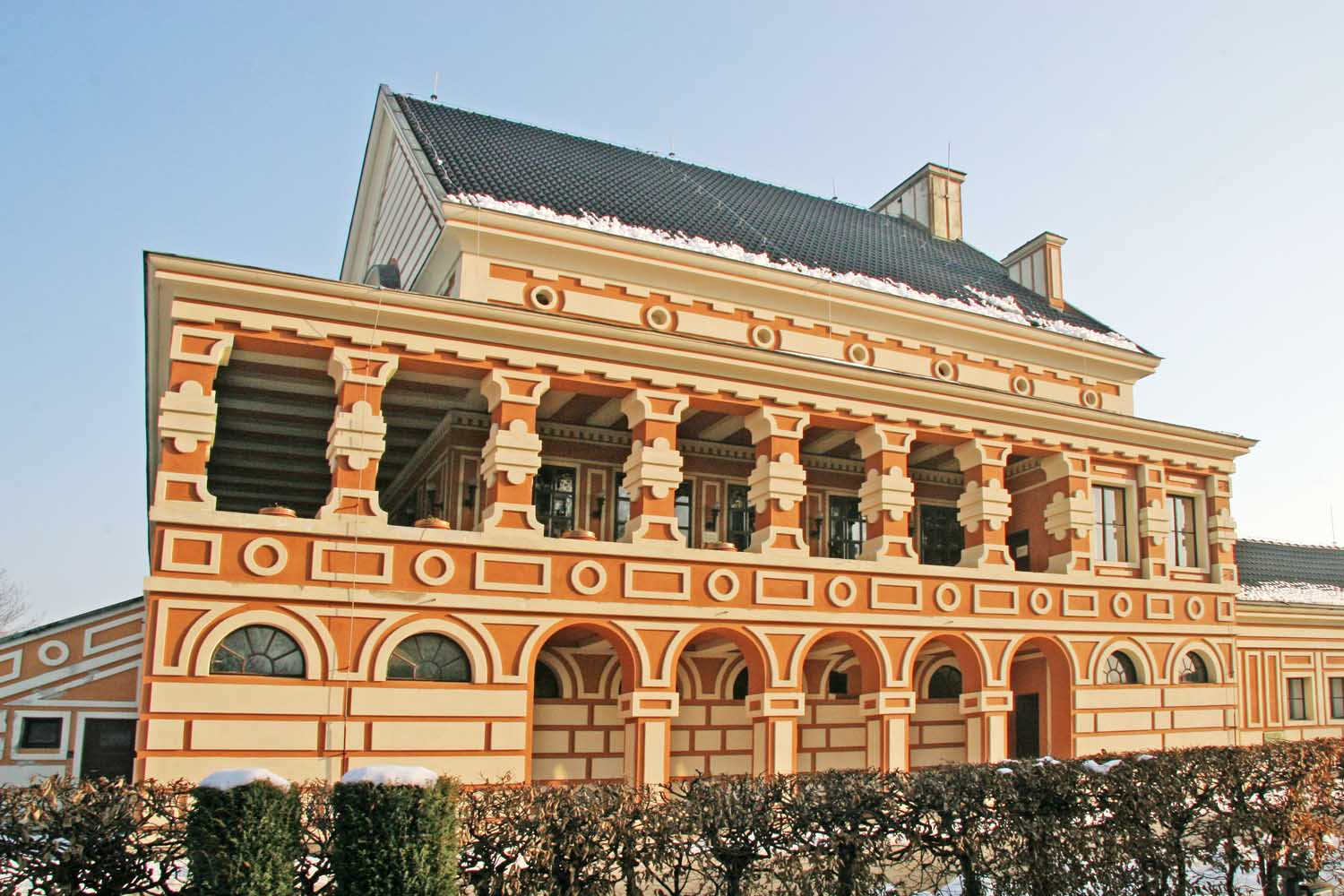
- Pardubice Crematorium
- Interactive map of the Pardubice Crematorium area

General information
- Location: Pardubice, Czech Republic
- Coordinates: 50.0193°N 15.7769°E
- Construction started: 1921
- Completed: 1923

Design and construction
- Architect: Pavel Janák

Pardubice Crematorium (Czech: krematorium Pardubice) is a crematorium in Pardubice, Czech Republic. Built in 1921–1923, it was the first Czech crematorium. It is a national cultural monument.

== Description and history ==
The crematorium was designed by the Czech architect Pavel Janák in the Czech Art Deco style and built in 1921–1923. It was the first Czech crematorium. The project came from a tender that was opened at the end of 1918 and took place in 1919. Janák's project was chosen from 81 architectonical designs.

The design of the crematorium was influenced by old Slavic mythology and the concept of ancient Christian basilicas. Janák was inspired by Peter Behrens' conception of the crematorium in Hagen.

Since 2010, the building has been protected as a national cultural monument.
