= Karl Koller (ophthalmologist) =

Austrian ophthalmologist (1857–1944)

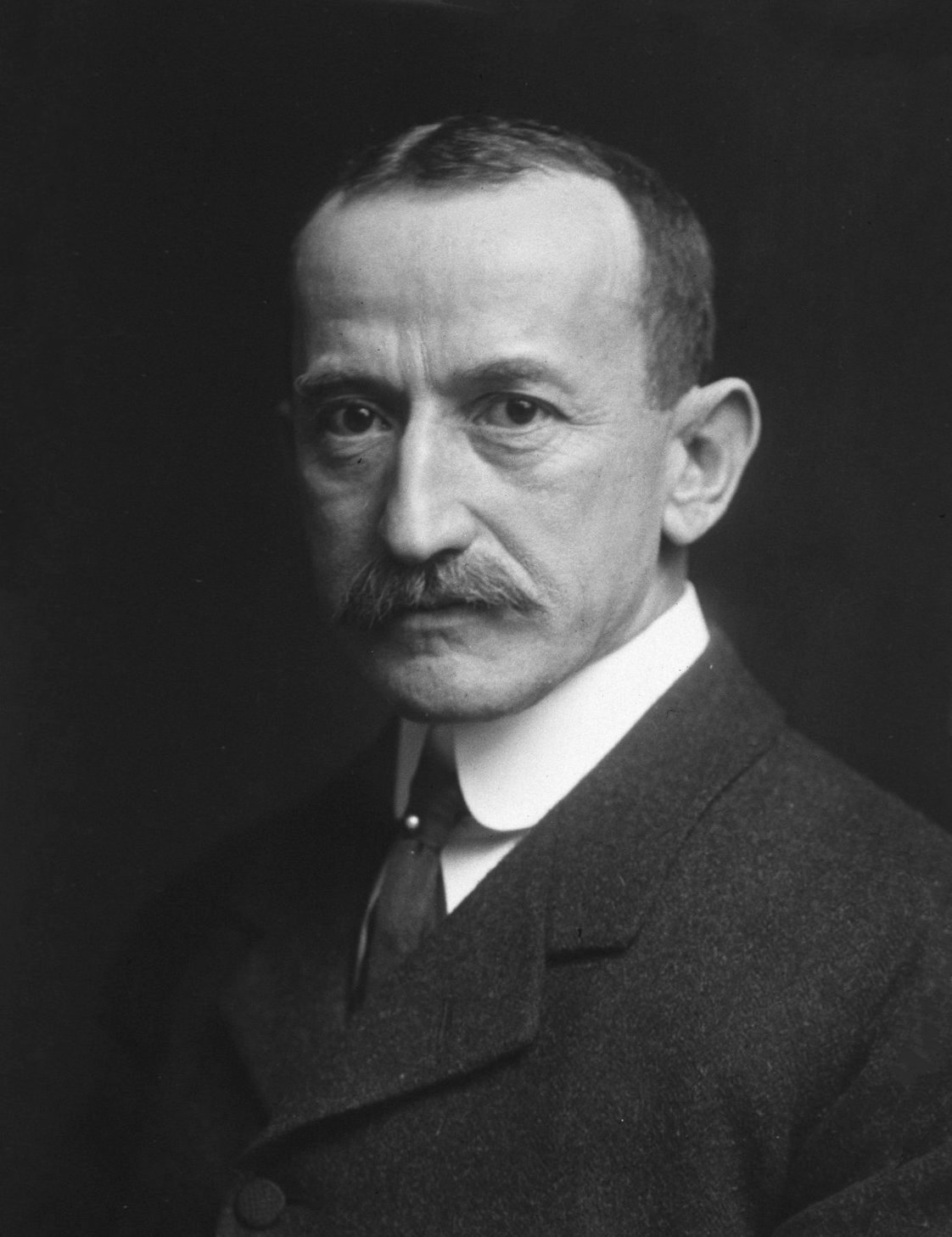
- Karl Koller
- Born: December 3, 1857; Sušice, Bohemia, Austrian Empire
- Died: March 21, 1944 (aged 86); New York City, United States
- Known for: Cocaine as a local anaesthetic
- Scientific career
- Fields: Ophthalmology

Karl Koller (December 3, 1857 – March 21, 1944) was an Austrian ophthalmologist. He began his medical career as a surgeon at the Vienna General Hospital and a colleague of Sigmund Freud.

== Biography ==
Koller introduced cocaine as a local anaesthetic for eye surgery. Prior to this discovery, he had tested solutions such as chloral hydrate and morphine as anaesthetics in the eyes of laboratory animals without success. Freud was fully aware of the pain-killing properties of cocaine, but Koller recognized its tissue-numbing capabilities, and in 1884 demonstrated its potential as a local anaesthetic to the medical community. Koller's findings were a medical breakthrough. Prior to his discovery, performing eye surgery was difficult because the involuntary reflex motions of the eye to respond to the slightest stimuli. Later, cocaine was also used as a local anaesthetic in other medical fields such as dentistry. In the 20th century, other agents such as lidocaine have replaced cocaine as a local anaesthetic.

While in Vienna, he was a victim of antisemitism. In January 1885, he got into a duel with another medical student who made an antisemitic remark about him. Koller won the duel by wounding the other student, but his career suffered in the aftermath.

In 1888, Karl Koller moved to the United States and practiced ophthalmology in New York. He received many distinctions in his career, including being honored by the American Ophthalmological Society as the first recipient of the "Lucien Howe Medal" in 1922. This award is given to physicians in recognition of outstanding achievements in ophthalmology. In 1930 he was also honored by the Medical Association of Vienna.

One of Koller's patients was a blind ten-year-old boy named Chauncey D. Leake. Leake recovered his sight and, as an adult, discovered the anaesthetic divinyl ether.

Sigmund Freud reportedly nicknamed Koller "Coca Koller" because of his association with cocaine, referencing the soft drink Coca-Cola which included cocaine at the time.

Although he was implored to recognise his status as a public figure due to his discovery of local anaesthesia, he did not engage in autobiography.

== See also ==
- Gustav Gärtner
