= NW F =

Nesselsdorfer Wagenbau-Fabriks-Gesellschaft Type F
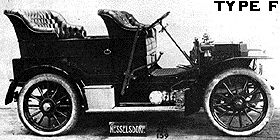

Overview
- Manufacturer: Nesselsdorfer Wagenbau-Fabriks-Gesellschaft A.G. (now known as Tatra)
- Production: 1905–1906; 3 produced
- Assembly: Kopřivnice, Moravia

Body and chassis
- Body style: Runabout
- Layout: Front mid-engine, rear-wheel drive layout

Powertrain
- Engine: 7,550 cc (460.7 cu in) liquid cooled flat four 20,6kW - 25kW (28-34HP)
- Transmission: four speeds (+reverse)

Dimensions
- Wheelbase: 2,300 mm (90.6 in)
- Curb weight: 1,150 kg (2,540 lb)

Chronology
- Predecessor: NW D
- Successor: NW J

The NW type F is a veteran automobile manufactured by Nesselsdorfer Wagenbau-Fabriks-Gesellschaft A.G. (NW, now known as Tatra) in 1904. The NW type F was considered a luxury model and produced in series with the NW type E, F, J and L. The four cylinder type F model was regarded as a commercial failure with only five models produced.

The type F was criticised at the time but was considered to be versatile and effective at climbing steep hills.

The car was able to reach a speed of 60 km/h.
