= Tatra 10 =

Nesselsdorf Type U Tatra 10
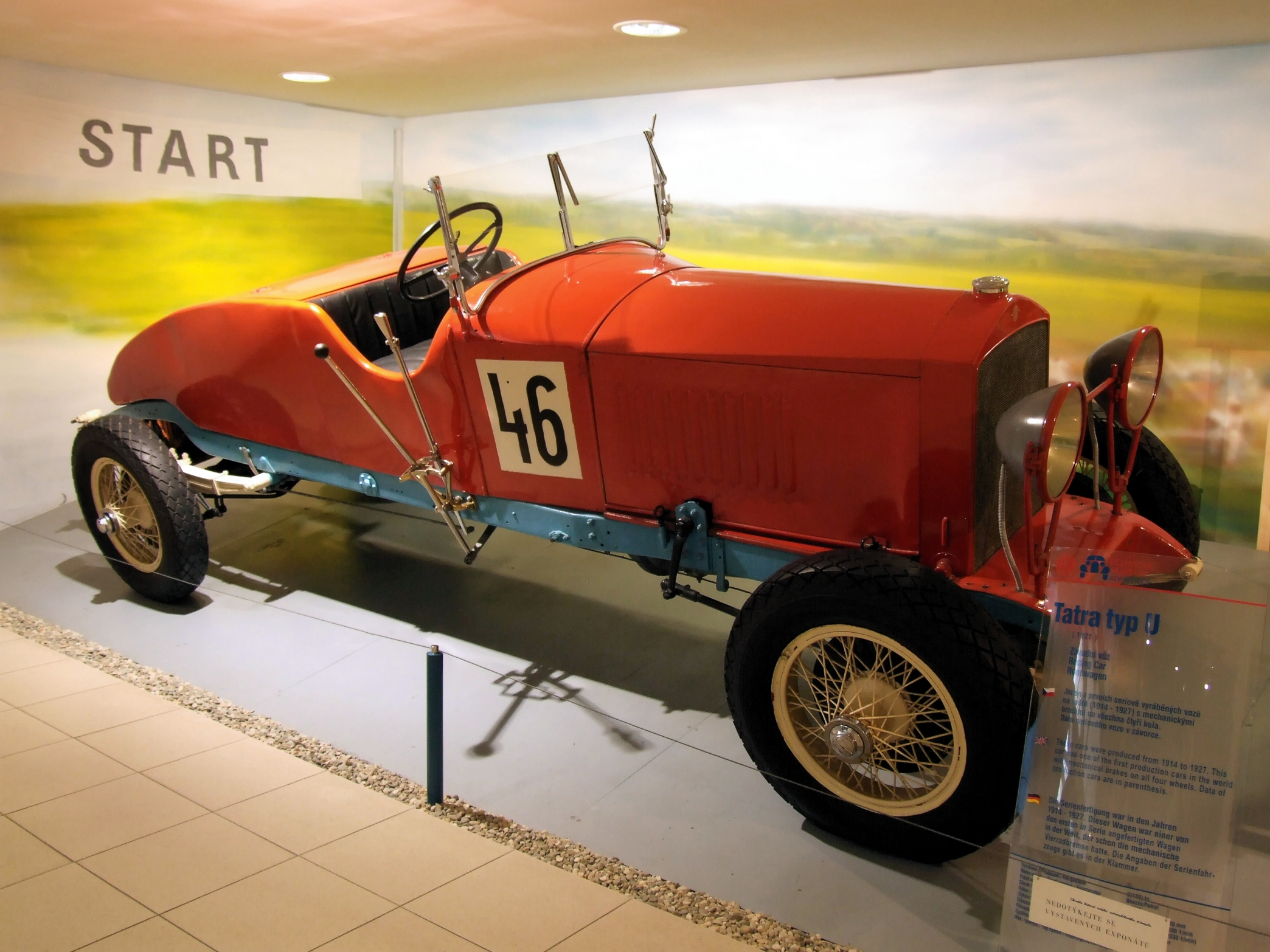

Overview
- Manufacturer: Nesselsdorfer Wagenbau-Fabriks-Gesellschaft A.G.
- Also called: NW U (1915–1919)
- Production: 1915–1927
- Assembly: Kopřivnice, Moravia
- Designer: Hans Ledwinka

Body and chassis
- Body style: diverse four or six seaters
- Layout: FR layout
- Related: NW T (Tatra 20)

Powertrain
- Engine: 5.3L NW U I6
- Transmission: 4-speed manual

Dimensions
- Wheelbase: 3,635 mm (143.1 in)
- Length: 4,900 mm (192.9 in)
- Width: 1,800 mm (70.9 in)
- Curb weight: 1,860 kg (4,100 lb) NW U; 1,920 kg (4,230 lb) Tatra 10

Chronology
- Predecessor: NW S
- Successor: Tatra 17

The NW type U is an Edwardian era automobile manufactured by Nesselsdorfer Wagenbau-Fabriks-Gesellschaft A.G. (NW, now known as Tatra). After the success of Type S, models NW T (four-cylinder, 1914) and NW U (six-cylinder, 1915) were launched. Both types were again OHC design with hemispherical combustion chambers with the cylinders cast in one piece with the engine block.

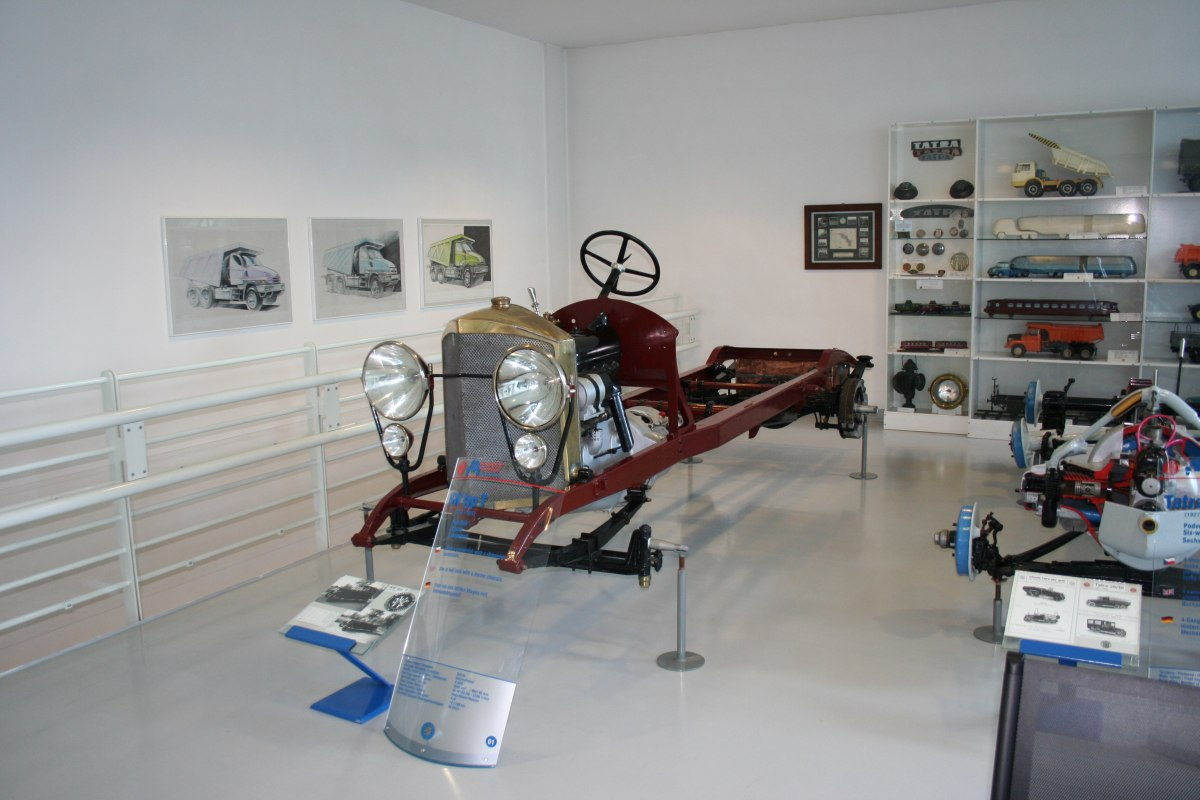
Tatra 10 chassis

As the company changed its name the model was renamed to Tatra 10 in 1919 and remained in production until 1925. The production version was able to reach 120 kilometres per hour (75 mph). In 1921 a 140 km/h racing version was created.

The Type U was fitted with brakes on all four wheels, probably the first production car in the world with such brake system.
