= Runabout =

A runabout is a small vehicle:

- Runabout (boat), a small boat
- Runabout (PWC), a sit down style personal watercraft.
- Runabout (car), an antique car body style, and the name of a 1964 concept car
- Runabout (carriage), a type of horse-drawn vehicle
- Runabout (series), a series of destruction driving video games
- Runabout (Star Trek), a type of spacecraft in the Star Trek universe
