= NW D =

Nesselsdorfer Wagenbau-Fabriks-Gesellschaft Type D
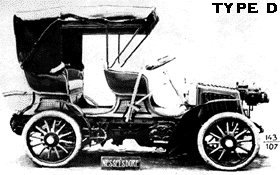

Overview
- Manufacturer: Nesselsdorfer Wagenbau-Fabriks-Gesellschaft A.G. today Tatra, a.s.
- Production: 1904; 3 produced
- Assembly: Kopřivnice, Moravia

Body and chassis
- Body style: Runabout
- Layout: Front mid-engine, rear-wheel drive layout

Powertrain
- Engine: 5,875 cc (358.5 cu in) liquid cooled flat four 17,7kW (24HP)
- Transmission: four speeds (+reverse)

Dimensions
- Wheelbase: 2,300 mm (90.6 in)
- Curb weight: 1,150 kg (2,540 lb)

Chronology
- Predecessor: NW C
- Successor: NW J

The NW type D is a veteran automobile manufactured by Nesselsdorfer Wagenbau-Fabriks-Gesellschaft A.G. (NW, now known as Tatra) in 1902. Only three cars of the design were made.

Type D had same chassis as Type C, but with different body on it, and the production version was slower than the initial Type C - only 50 km/h.
