= NW E =

Nesselsdorfer Wagenbau-Fabriks-Gesellschaft Type E
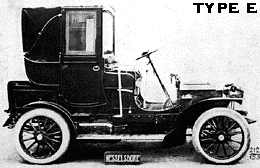

Overview
- Manufacturer: Nesselsdorfer Wagenbau-Fabriks-Gesellschaft A.G. today Tatra, a.s.
- Production: 1904–1906 about 17 produced (The exact number is unknown)
- Assembly: Kopřivnice, Moravia

Body and chassis
- Body style: Runabout 2-4 seater
- Layout: Front mid-engine, rear-wheel drive layout

Powertrain
- Engine: 3,775 cc (230.4 cu in) liquid cooled flat two 11,8kW - 13,2kW (16-18HP)
- Transmission: four speeds (+reverse)

Dimensions
- Wheelbase: 2,470 mm (97.2 in)
- Curb weight: 1,020 kg (2,250 lb)

Chronology
- Predecessor: NW B
- Successor: Tatra 11

The NW type E is a veteran automobile manufactured by Nesselsdorfer Wagenbau-Fabriks-Gesellschaft A.G. (NW, now known as Tatra).

The car was able to reach speed of 90 km/h.
