= NW C =

Nesselsdorf Type C

Overview
- Manufacturer: Nesselsdorfer Wagenbau-Fabriks-Gesellschaft today Tatra, a.s.
- Production: 1902; 2 produced
- Assembly: Kopřivnice, Moravia

Body and chassis
- Body style: Runabout
- Layout: Front mid-engine, rear-wheel drive layout

Powertrain
- Engine: 5,875 cc (358.5 cu in) water cooled flat-four 24 bhp (18 kW)
- Transmission: four-speed (plus reverse)

Dimensions
- Wheelbase: 2,300 mm (90.6 in)
- Curb weight: 1,540 kg (3,400 lb)

Chronology
- Predecessor: NW B
- Successor: NW J

The Nesselsdorf Type C is an automobile from the veteran era manufactured by the Nesselsdorfer Wagenbau-Fabriks-Gesellschaft (NW, now known as Tatra) in 1902. Only two cars of the design were made, and production of the Type C's predecessor, the NW B, continued past that of the Type C (1901–1904).

The Type C was able to reach speeds of 90 km/h (56 mph).
