= Middleby Auto Company =

Defunct American motor vehicle manufacturer

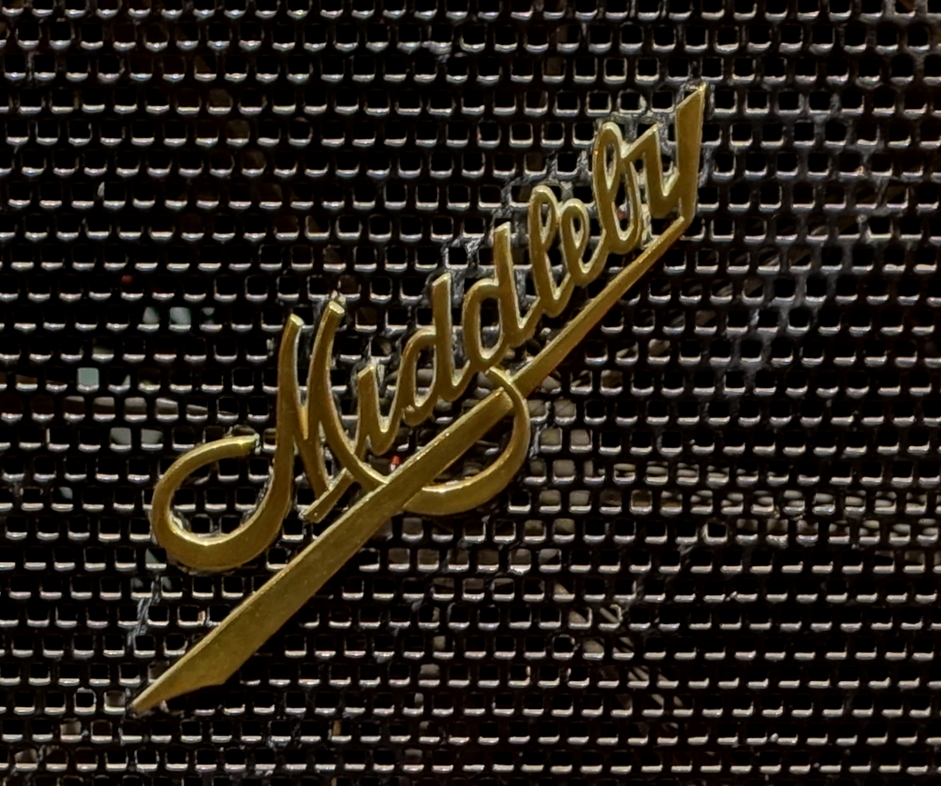
- Industry: Automobile manufacturer
- Founded: 1908; 118 years ago
- Founder: Joseph Middleby or Charles M. Middleby
- Defunct: 1913; 113 years ago
- Fate: Closed and sold
- Headquarters: Reading, Pennsylvania
- Products: Automobiles
- Brands: Middleby, Reading

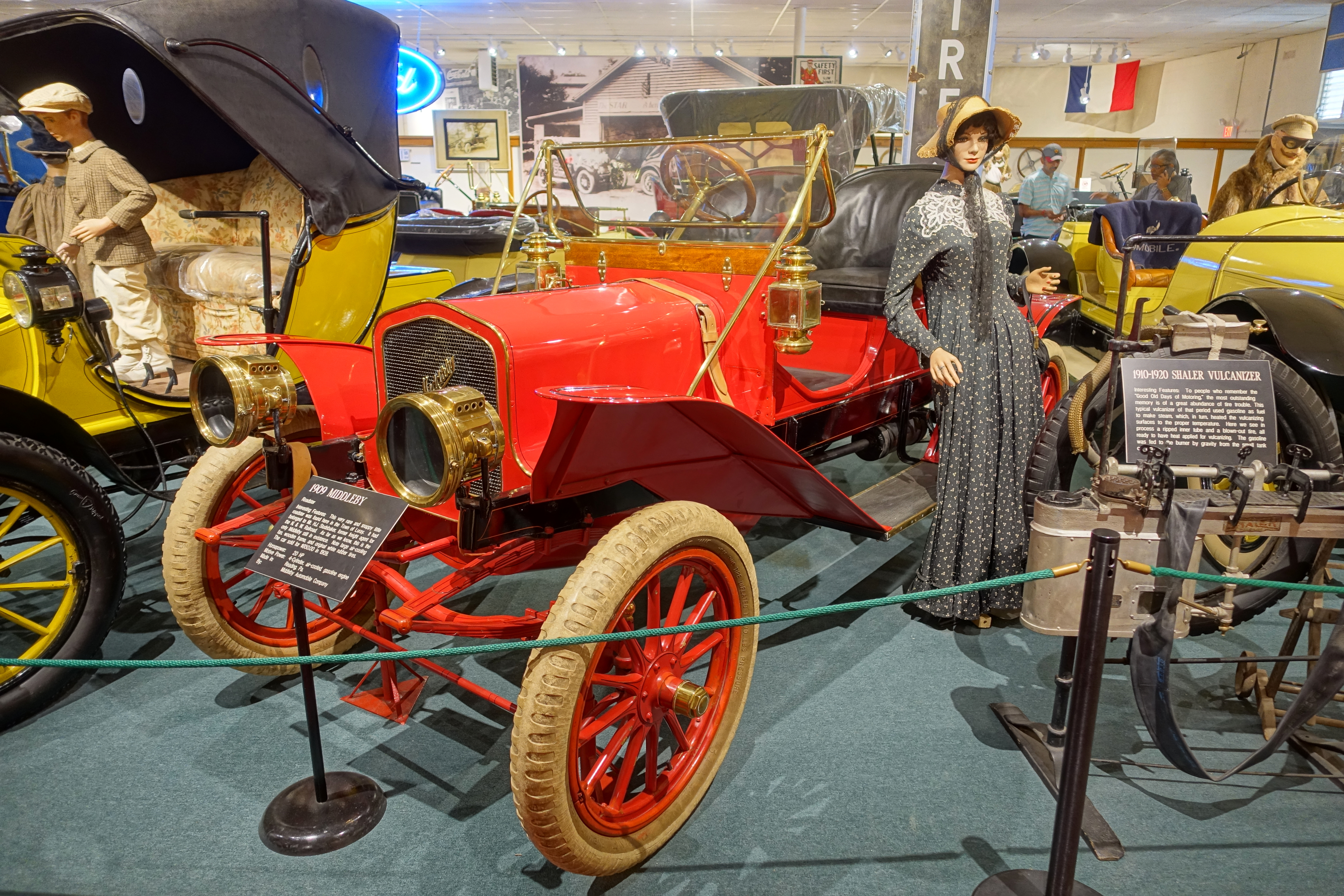
Middleby roadster, 1909

The Middleby Auto Company (1908–1913) was a brass era American automobile manufacturer, based in Reading, Pennsylvania.

== History ==
The company was founded by Joseph Middleby, who purchased the Duryea Power Company factory. Some Middlebys were sold as Readings.

Middleby's first 1908 Model A automobile was a runabout with a 108-inch wheelbase and 30 x 3 1/2-inch tires, a four-cylinder, air-cooled engine, with a sliding-gear shaft-drive transmission with three speeds forward and one reverse. Standard equipment included two gas lamps, two side oil lamps, one rear lamp, tools, and a French horn. Its price was $850, equivalent to $30,458 in 2025.

Model B was a touring car, based on the same chassis, and priced at $1,000. By 1910 the company had sold about 400 automobiles. After 1911, the wheel base increased to 120 inches, with 36-inch wheels and a 4-cylinder water-cooled engine. Middleby automobiles were produced in six models: a Runabout for $850, single rumble for $1,000, surrey for $1,000, double rumble for $1,100, touring car for $1,200, and Toy Tonneau for $1,200, equivalent to $41,464 in 2025.

Two automobile reference books show Charles M. Middleby as company owner. His relationship to the plant property owner, Joseph Middleby, is not known. Joseph Middleby died in 1911, and the company was operated by his executors until closed and sold in 1913.

== Middleby Advertisements ==
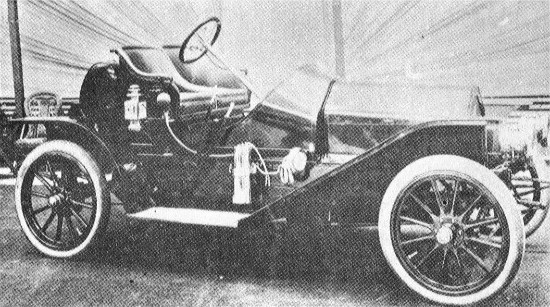
1908 Middleby Runabout

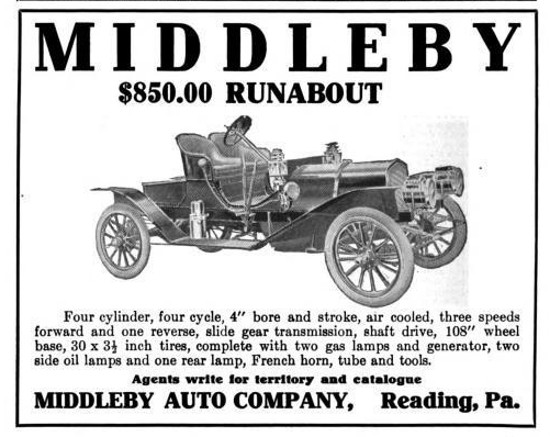
1908 Middleby Advertisement

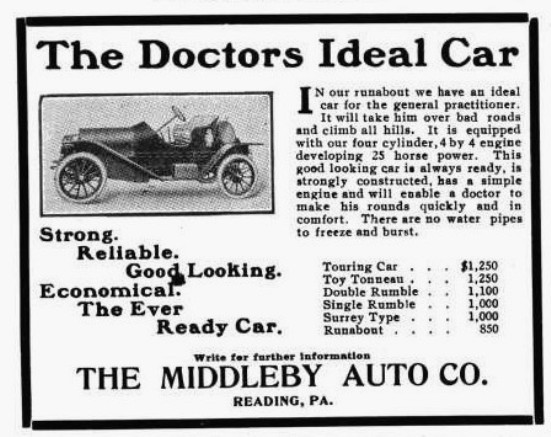
1913 Middleby Advertisement

== Reading ==
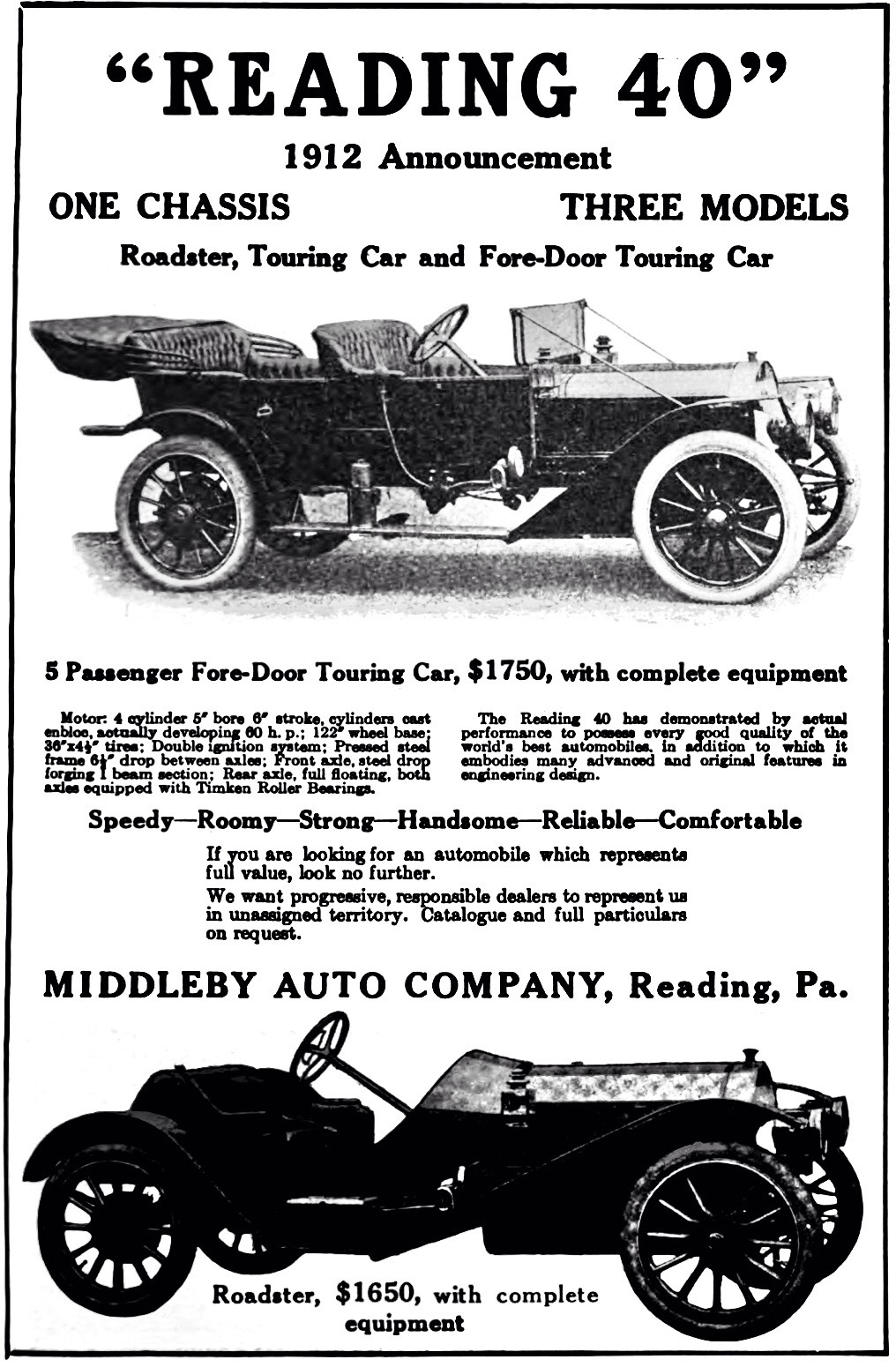
Reading 40 (1912-1913) 122 inch wheelbase

Between 1910 and 1913, an up-market Middleby was market as the Reading. It had a larger four-cylinder engine, was a foot longer in wheelbase, and was priced several hundred dollars more. Charles M. Middleby decided that his top-of-the-line car should carry his own name, a bigger and pricier Middleby was introduced for 1911. Both marques ended in 1913.
