= NW Rennzweier =

Nesselsdorfer Wagenbau-Fabriks-Gesellschaft Rennzweier
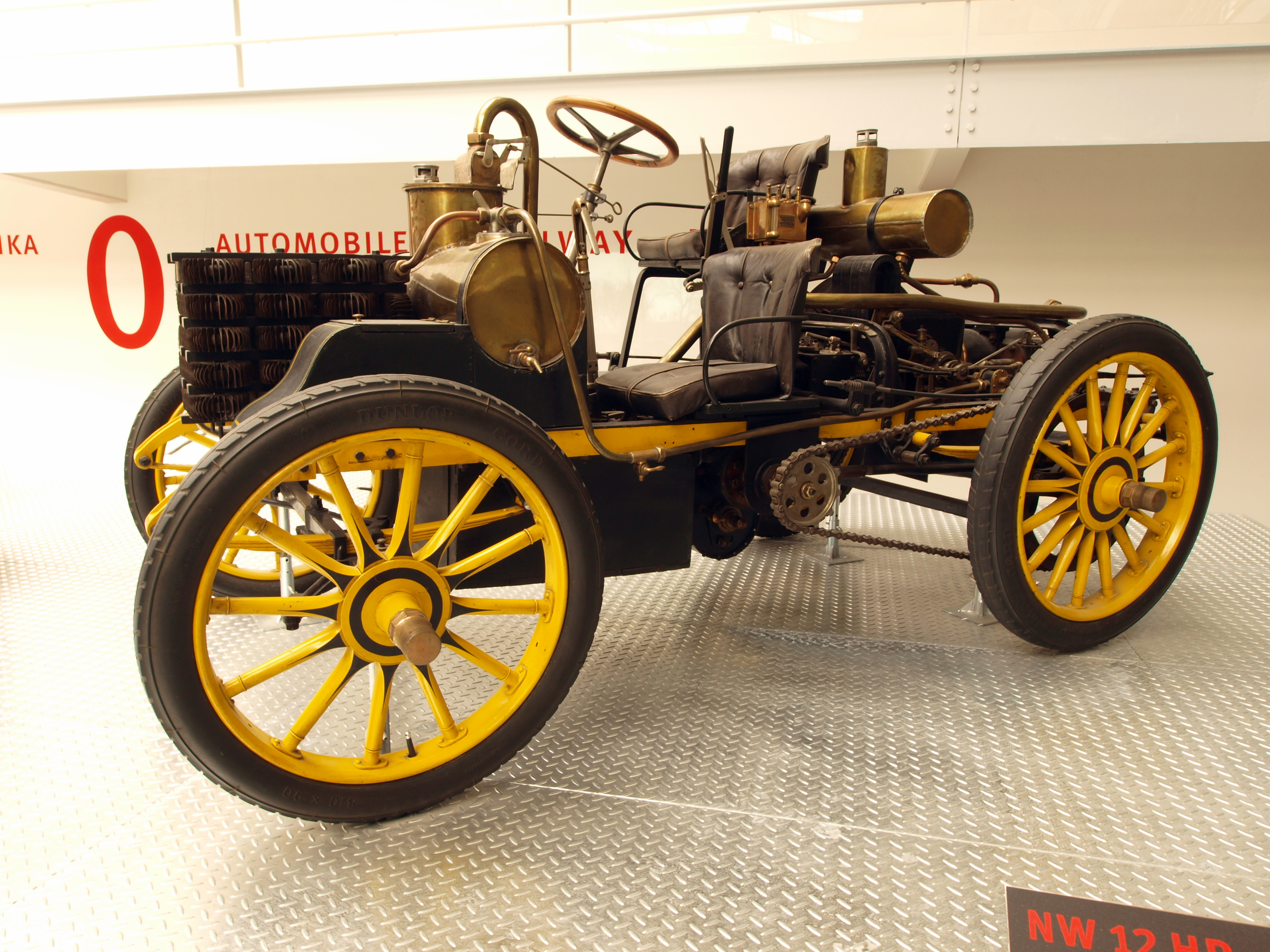

Overview
- Manufacturer: Nesselsdorfer Wagenbau-Fabriks-Gesellschaft today Tatra
- Production: 1900
- Assembly: Nesselsdorf, Margraviate of Moravia, Cisleithania

Body and chassis
- Class: Race car
- Body style: Runabout
- Layout: MR layout

Powertrain
- Engine: 4,250 cc (259 cu in) 130 mm × 160 mm (5.1 in × 6.3 in) bore/stroke water-cooled flat-twin Benz
- Power output: 12 hp (8.9 kW) at 650 rpm
- Transmission: 4-speed

Dimensions
- Wheelbase: 1,850 mm (73 in)
- Width: 1,375 mm (54.1 in)
- Curb weight: 975 kg (2,150 lb)

Chronology
- Predecessor: Präsident

The Double Racer (German: Rennzweier) is a race car manufactured by the Nesselsdorfer Wagenbau-Fabriksgesellschaft (NW), now Tatra, in 1900. It is sometimes also called First Racing, 12 HP, or Race Car (German: Rennwagen). It was commissioned by Baron Theodor von Liebieg. Hans Ledwinka, the man behind the famous rear-engined Tatras, and at the time only 20 years old, helped in the production of the car. The car was designed and built in a five-week period in April and May 1900. The Rennzweier was the first car designed specifically for racing to be built in Central Europe.

In 1994, a 2 Kč commemorative stamp featuring the Rennzweier, designed by Bedřich Housa, was issued.

== Background ==
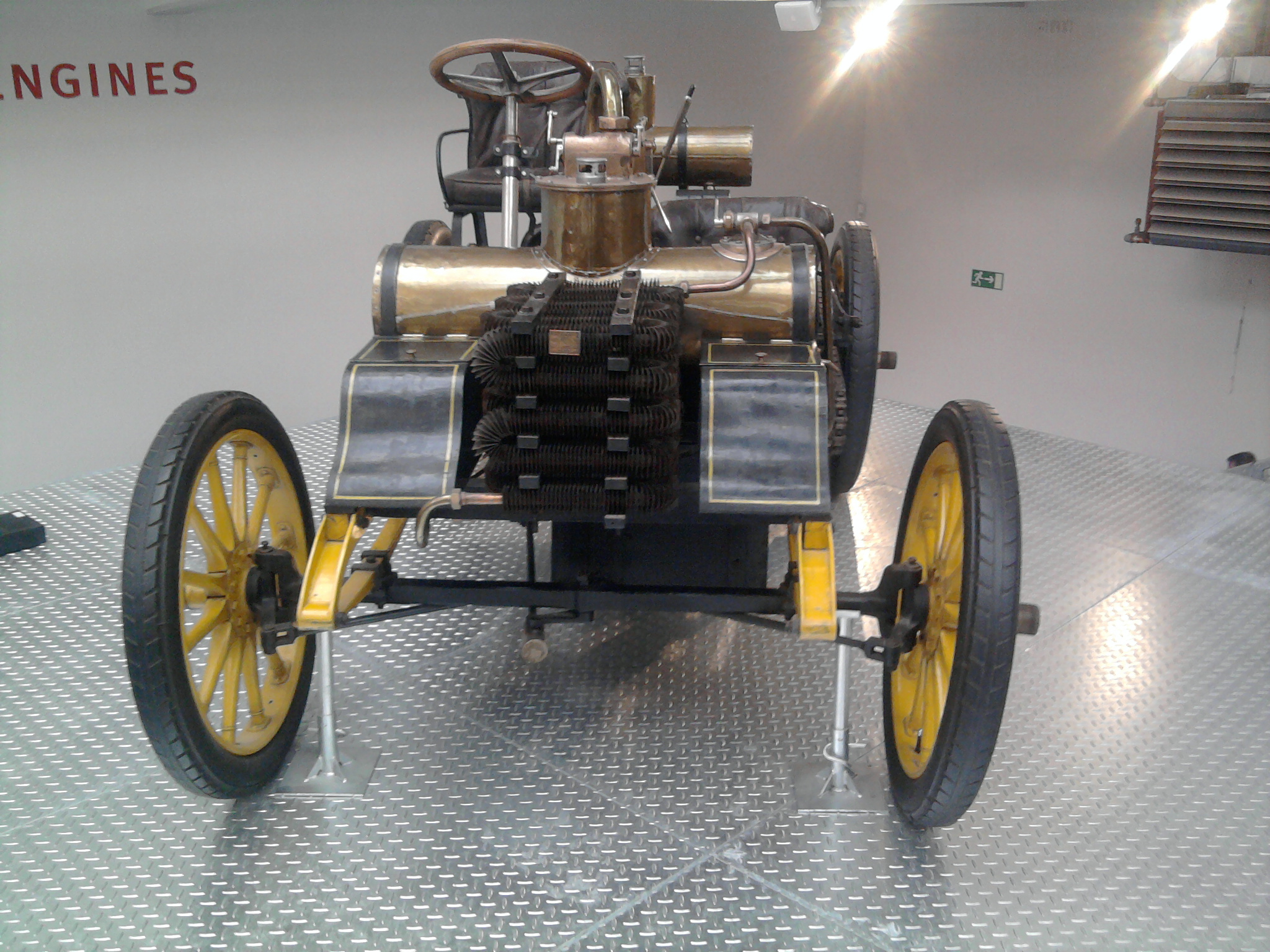
Front view

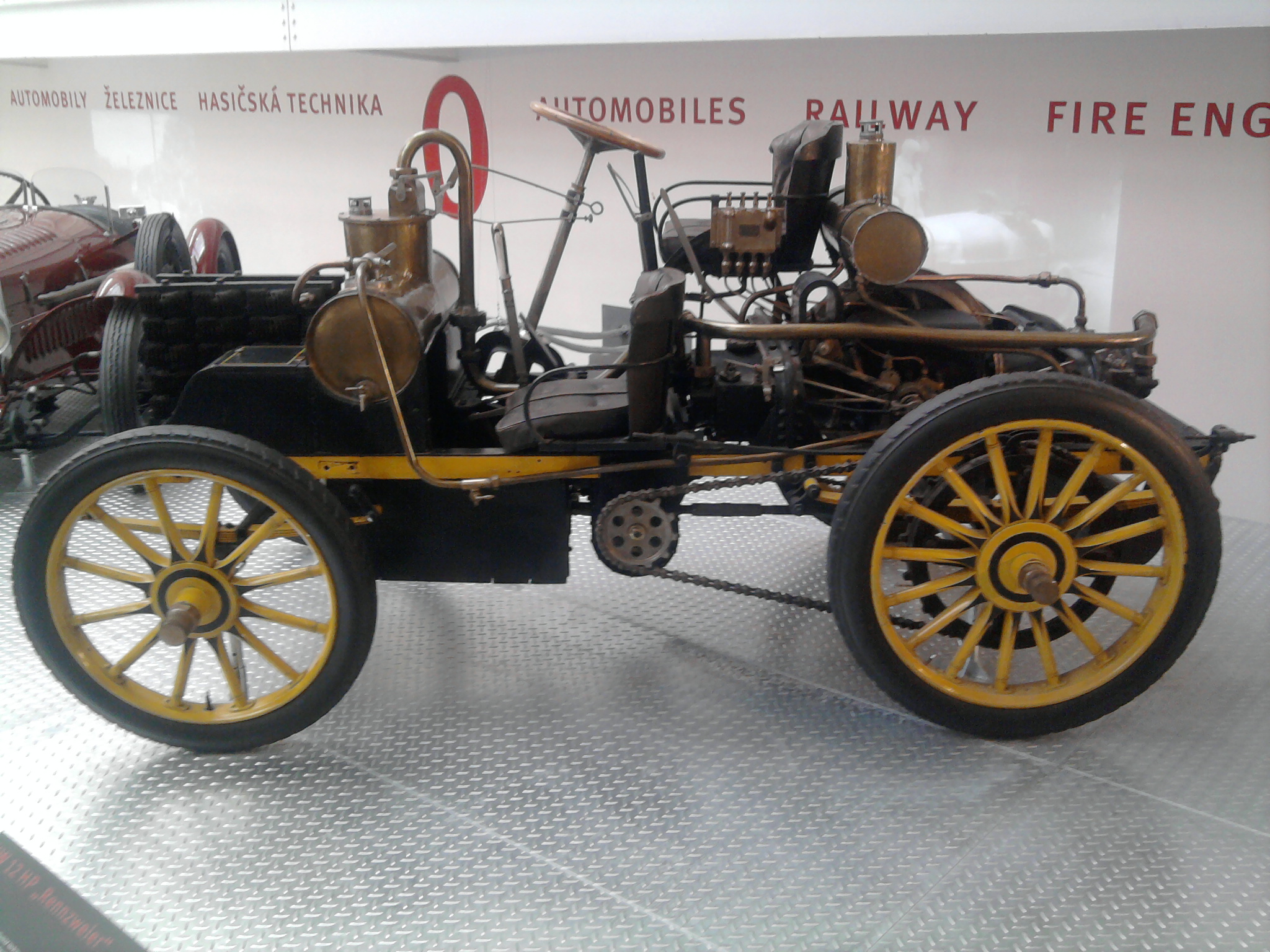
Side view

After the production of its first automobile, the Präsident, in 1897 – 1898, NW continued producing automobiles that followed the design of the original Präsident.

On 23 October 1899, two of these Präsident-derived cars, the Wien and the Nesselsdorf, competed in the first automobile race held in Austria-Hungary. The race took place in Vienna, on the Trabrennbahn Krieau, a trotting track near the Prater. Competing cars were the Wien, the Nesselsdorf, four Benz cars, and four Dietrich-Bolleé cars. Baron Theodor von Liebieg, driving the Wien, won the race, and the Nesselsdorf came in second.

In March 1900, Liebieg raced the 192 km (119 mi) triangle track Nice – Draguignan – Nice, where he won the second stage outright. Four days later he won the four-seaters under 1,000 kg (2,200 lb) class in the famous Nice – La Turbie hill climb race.

The Präsident-derived cars Liebieg was competing with were designed for ordinary use, not racing. So after his successes of late 1899 and early 1900, Liebieg commissioned NW to produce a new automobile specifically designed for racing. NW fulfilled this order with the Rennzweier, the first race car built in Central Europe.

== Design ==
The construction was unique at the time. The car was very low, especially the driver's seat. There was no bodywork – all mechanical parts were uncovered. Unlike its predecessors, the steering column was slightly tilted.

The car had a modified Benz engine. It was a two-cylinder spark ignition engine with a power output of about 12 hp (8.9 kW) at 650 rpm. It was transversely mounted above the driven rear axle.

The driver was situated on a heightened seat behind the steering wheel, while the passenger seat was much lower on the frame, so the passenger's legs were sticking out under the car.

The gas tank had a volume of 42 liters, while there was also another tank behind the driver for 15 liters of coolant.

The car was able to reach a maximum speed of 82 km/h (51 mph).

Von Liebieg raced the car in numerous contests. He won the La Turbie race that took place in Nice, and took second position in Salzburg-Linz-Vienna race. He later also took part in the Paris-Vienna race.

Today the Rennzweier is exhibited at the Czech National Technical Museum.

A second racing car was made in 1901. This one also made do without bodywork, and this time featured a Hardy engine (flat two, 3188cc, 7,4 kW-8,85 kW (10-12HP)) was used instead of the previous Benz one.
