= Präsident =

Nesselsdorf Präsident
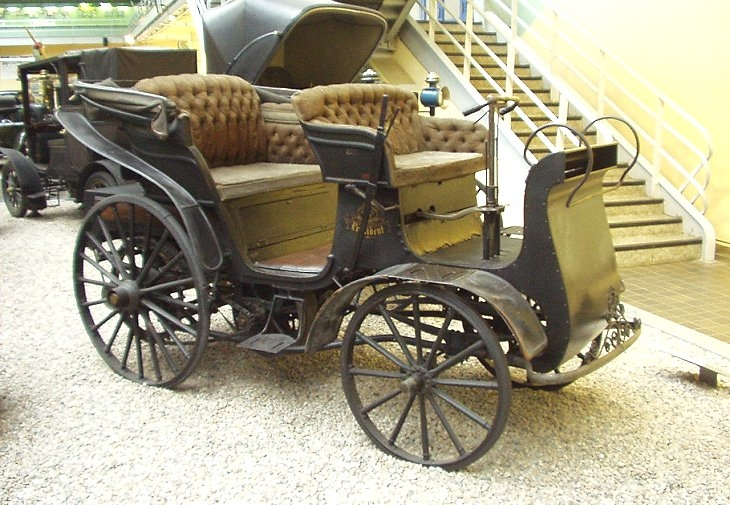

Overview
- Manufacturer: Nesselsdorfer Wagenbau-Fabriks-Gesellschaft now Tatra
- Production: 1897
- Assembly: Nesselsdorf, Margraviate of Moravia, Cisleithania
- Designer: Leopold Sviták, Hans Ledwinka, Edmund Rumpler

Body and chassis
- Body style: Phaeton
- Layout: RR layout

Powertrain
- Engine: 2,714 cc (165.6 cu in), 120 mm × 120 mm (4.7 in × 4.7 in) bore/stroke, water cooled, flat-twin, flathead Benz
- Power output: 6.5 bhp (4.8 kW) at 600 rpm
- Transmission: 2-speed

Dimensions
- Wheelbase: 1,780 mm (70 in)
- Length: 3,225 mm (127.0 in)
- Width: 1,472 mm (58.0 in)
- Height: 2,290 mm (90 in) (with roof on)
- Curb weight: 1,072 kg (2,363 lb)

The Präsident was an automobile manufactured by the Nesselsdorfer Wagenbau-Fabriks-Gesellschaft (Nesselsdorf or NW), since 1919 Tatra, in 1897. It was the first practical, factory-produced petrol engine automobile built in Central and Eastern Europe (Siegfried Marcus's earlier cars were experimental and not practical). It was constructed by Leopold Sviták and Hans Ledwinka. The automobile was more of a carriage without horses than a car in modern sense. The car is steered via handlebars (while most of the cars of the era had a tiller). The wooden bodywork is placed on an iron frame. It has four seats and a convertible top that would cover only the rear seats. Both axles have suspension of semi-elliptical leaf springs. The wheels were similar to the ones of a horse carriage, but had rubber tyres. The car had a two cylinder spark ignition Benz engine placed by the rear axle.

== History ==
In 1895, NW's director Hugo Fischer von Röslerstamm decided set up an experimental automobile shop. Baron Theodor von Liebieg of Liberec, whose 2,500 km (1,600 mi) driving tour of Europe in 1894, which transpired without any major difficulties, brought fame to the Benz Viktoria, and ingratiated Liebieg to Benz. Liebieg advised the directors of NW to work with Benz, and they opened negotiations with Benz & Cie. In the winter of 1896 – 1897, NW sent Franz Cáhel, NW's chief machinist, to Mannheim (the home of Benz & Cie.) to purchase licensing allowing them to build automobiles with Benz engines. NW also bought a Benz Viktoria, and a new flat-twin Benz engine (Benz had only just patented his flat, also called boxer, engine in 1896). The Benz Viktoria is a single-cylinder, phaeton body automobile, and was the first four-wheeled vehicle model produced by Benz & Cie.

The Viktoria and the engine arrived at the Neutitschein train station on 7 March 1897. Leopold Sviták, NW's master mechanic, and Cáhel, who had learned to drive while visiting Benz, picked up the Viktoria and drove it to Nesselsdorf.

The Viktoria was given the name "Instruktor" ("Instructor"), because it served as a model during the building of NW's first automobile. However, NW's automobile is not a copy of the Viktoria. Work on the new car did not begin until June. Sviták led the project. The automobile was up and running that fall. It was given the name "Präsident" in honor of Count Gustav Pötting-Persing, the first president of the Austrian Automobile Club (German: Österreichischer Automobil-Club), which had just been founded on 6 February. Production of the Präsident was very expensive; the total cost was 400,000 gulden.

On 21 May 1898, the Präsident took its first long distance trip, from Nesselsdorf to Vienna, a distance of 328 km (204 mi). The drivers were Fischer and Baron Liebieg, and it took them 14.5 hours to complete the journey. Their average speed was 22.6 km/h (14.0 mph), and there were no significant malfunctions.

While in Vienna, the Präsident was one of four cars shown in the "Collective Exhibition of Austrian Automobile Manufacturers" (German: Collectiv-Ausstellung der Automobilbauer Österreichs), which was organized by the Austrian Automobile Club, and held as part of the Jubilee-Exhibition (German: Jubiläumsausstellung). After the exhibition the Präsident was donated to the Austrian Automobile Club, whose headquarters was in Vienna's first district, to be used for training drivers.

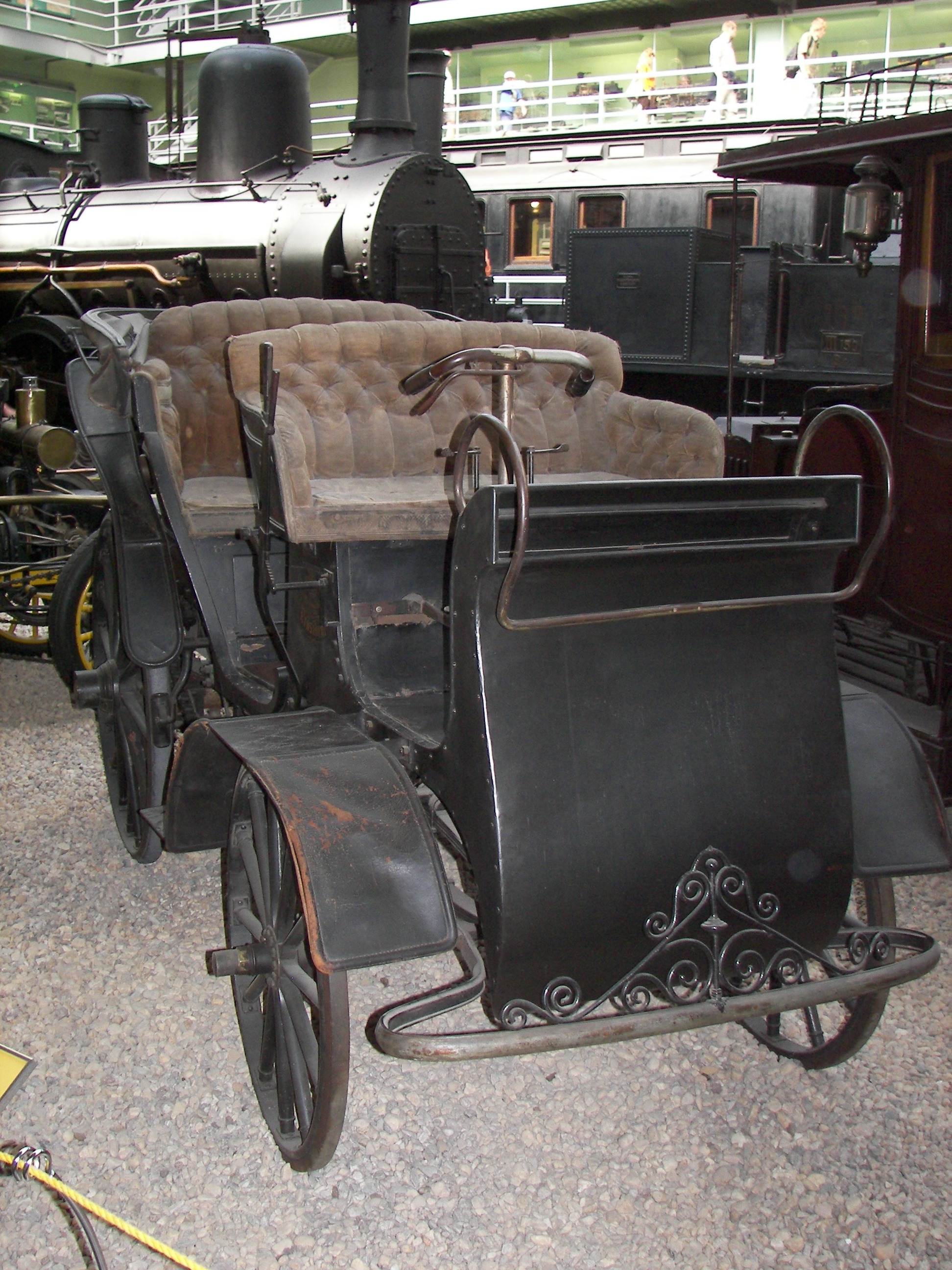
The original Präsident, displayed in the National Technical Museum in Prague

== Design ==
The car had a flat two-cylinder four stroke spark ignition Benz engine. It had two speed transmission which propelled the rear axle via flat strap.

The bodywork was derived from a Mylord type horse carriage. At the time NW was renowned in the monarchy for its luxurious carriages, and the automobile itself was made in according fashion.

It was able to reach up to 30 km/h (19 mph). It seated four, the two rear seats could be covered by a convertible top. The car was steered by handlebars. Tilting the handlebars forward and backward changed gears (forward, lower gear, backward, upper gear). The wheels were wooden with gum tires.

The unique features of the car were a differential and functional bumper.

== Conservation ==
=== Original ===
The very first Präsident produced (factory number 50, even though it was the first) is now displayed in the National Technical Museum in Prague, and is still drivable. However, before it was given to the museum in 1918 it was used in Austria to train drivers, and was therefore modified, so it differs significantly from the original design. Notably, it does not have its original Benz engine. The engine now fitted in the Präsident is probably the first engine made by in Nesselsdorf by NW (NW began manufacturing engines in 1900).

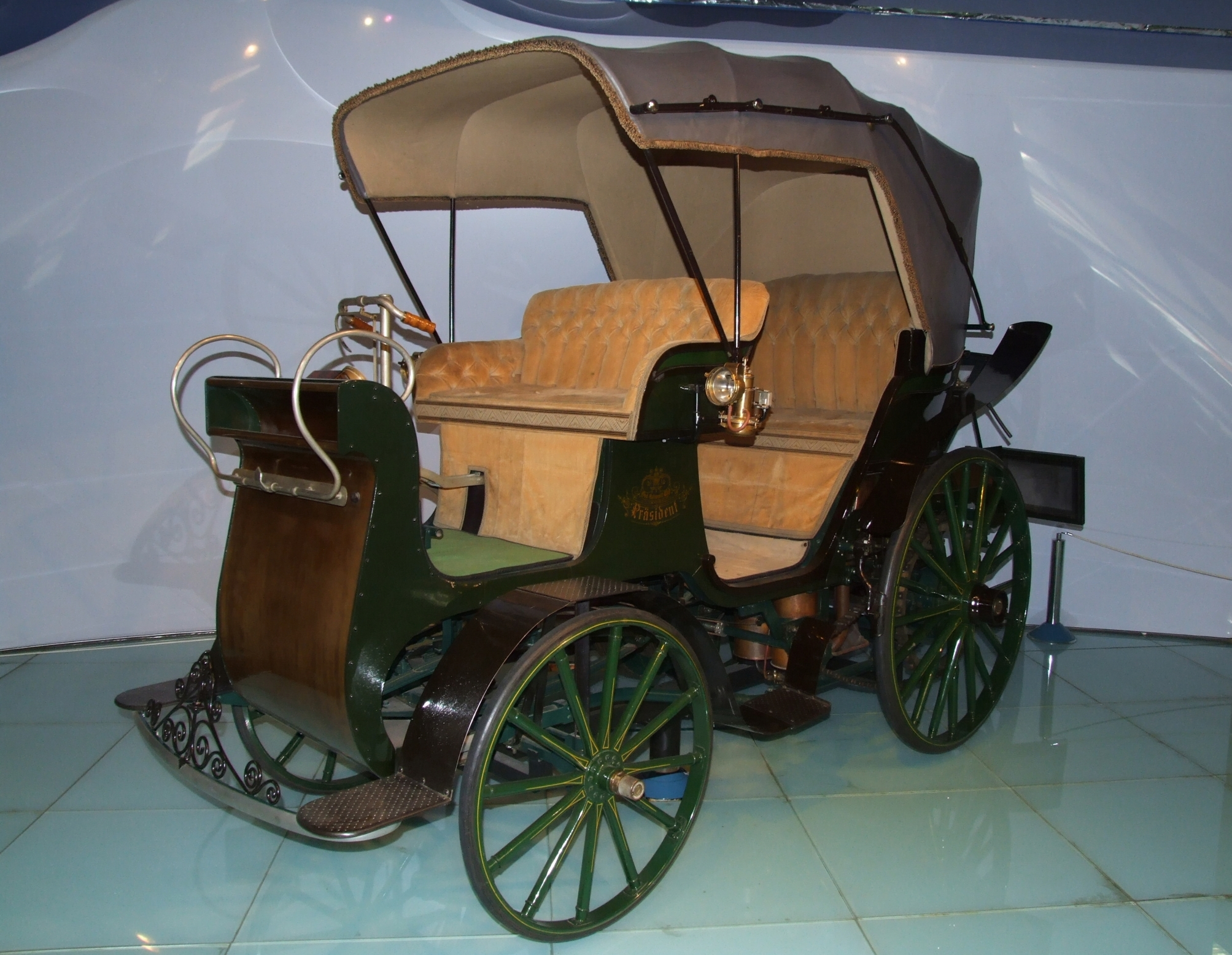
Präsident replica in Tatra factory museum

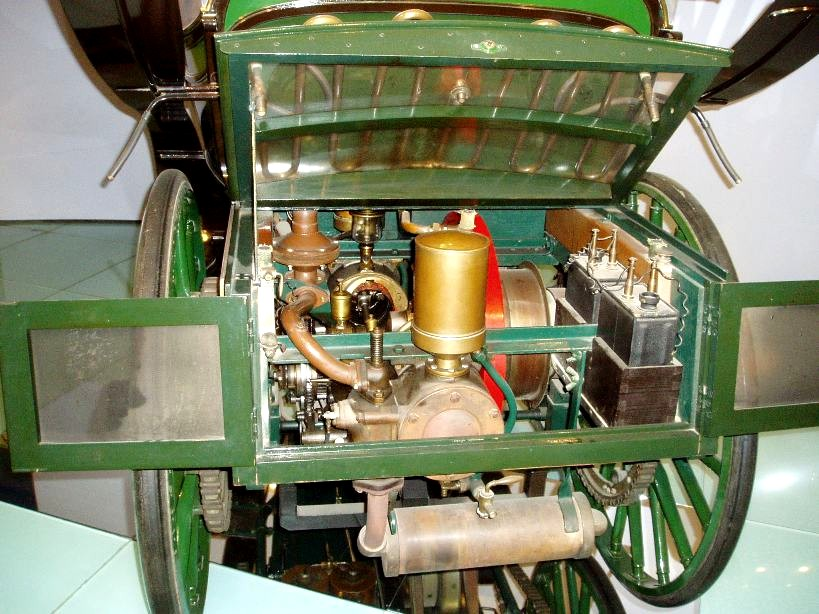
Benz engine in 1977 Präsident replica

=== Replica ===
In 1977 a group of enthusiasts from the Tatra factory made an exact replica of the original 1897 Präsident. The replica is displayed in the Tatra factory museum in Kopřivnice.

There were a few reasons why the replica was built. First of all, the company wanted to have the Präsident for the jubilee celebrations, and secondly the original underwent modifications of engine, accessory, lights, the convertible top as well as of the colour livery, and thus it couldn't represent the factory's very first car. The work on replica started in March 1974 and were scheduled to be finished on 1 May 1977.

60 original papers of design documentation survived, however another 1150 had to be made, for which purposes the original Präsident was used. The manufacture took place in Tatra factory and was conducted by its engineers as well as retired workers of technical department.

The engine was manufactured also by Tatra. Four of them were made - one for the "new" Präsident, one for the National Technical Museum, where it is on exposition near the original Präsident (which has a larger engine than it was made with), and the two other were made to be joined as a four-cylinder used in a replica of the First Truck. The replica is drivable and is on display in Tatra factory museum.

== Legacy ==
The cars NW produced after the Präsident followed it closely in design.

- Meteor (number 51)
- Nesselsdorf (number 52)
  - for Count Gustav Pötting-Persing
- Wien (number 53)
  - for Baron Theodor von Liebieg
- Bergsteiger (number 54)
- Versucher (number 55)
- Auhof (number 56)
- Spitzbub (number 57)

The Balder and Metrans are sometimes listed as Präsident-derived cars, but the Balder was actually a 9 hp (6.7 kW) Nesselsdorf A – Vierer.

Some elements of the design were modified, e.g. the belt drive was replaced by a four speed gearbox with spur gears. A cable drive was attempted before the gearbox, but it was not successful.

=== Use in racing ===
On 23 October 1899, two of these Präsident-derived cars, the Wien and the Nesselsdorf, competed in the first automobile race held in Austria-Hungary. The race took place in Vienna, on the Trabrennbahn Krieau, a trotting track near the Prater. Competing cars were the Wien, the Nesselsdorf, four Benz cars, and four Dietrich-Bolleé cars. Baron Theodor von Liebieg, driving the Wien, won the race, and the Nesselsdorf came in second.

In March 1900, Liebieg raced the 192 km (119 mi) triangle track Nice – Draguignan – Nice, where he won the second stage outright. Four days later he won the four-seaters under 1,000 kg (2,200 lb) class in the famous Nice – La Turbie hill climb race.

The Präsident-derived cars Liebieg was competing with were designed for ordinary use, not racing. So after his successes of late 1899 and early 1900, Liebieg commissioned NW to produce a new automobile specifically designed for racing. NW fulfilled this order with the Rennzweier, the first race car built in Central Europe.

=== Later models ===
For later models the alphabets were used (A, B, S, T, U ...), and since about 1921 as the company changed name to Tatra, it uses numbers to name the models (11, 12, 20...). One year after the manufacture of Präsident, the First Truck was built. The manufacture of cars continued in Kopřivnice till 1998 with the last car Tatra T700. The manufacture of heavy duty trucks continues up to today.

Even today's models (i.e. Tatra 815) follow the unique design features (such as backbone tube with swinging half-axles) which were introduced by Hans Ledwinka in 1920s, who himself took part in construction of the Präsident. Throughout the time, Tatra introduced to the automotive world revolutionary concepts such as modern car aerodynamics through model Tatra T77, as well as design of a "peoples car" through Tatra V570 and Tatra T97. However, 40 years of planned economy in Czechoslovakia made the company to specialize in heavy off-road trucks while the manufacture of cars was only subsidiary. The turmoil years after the Velvet revolution brought Tatra to the edge of bankruptcy and consequently the manufacture of cars was abandoned, while only the production of heavy-duty trucks continues.

== See also ==
- VinFast President, limited edition car model made by VinFast named after the Nesselsdorf Präsident
