= NW B =

Nesselsdorf Neuer Vierer Type B
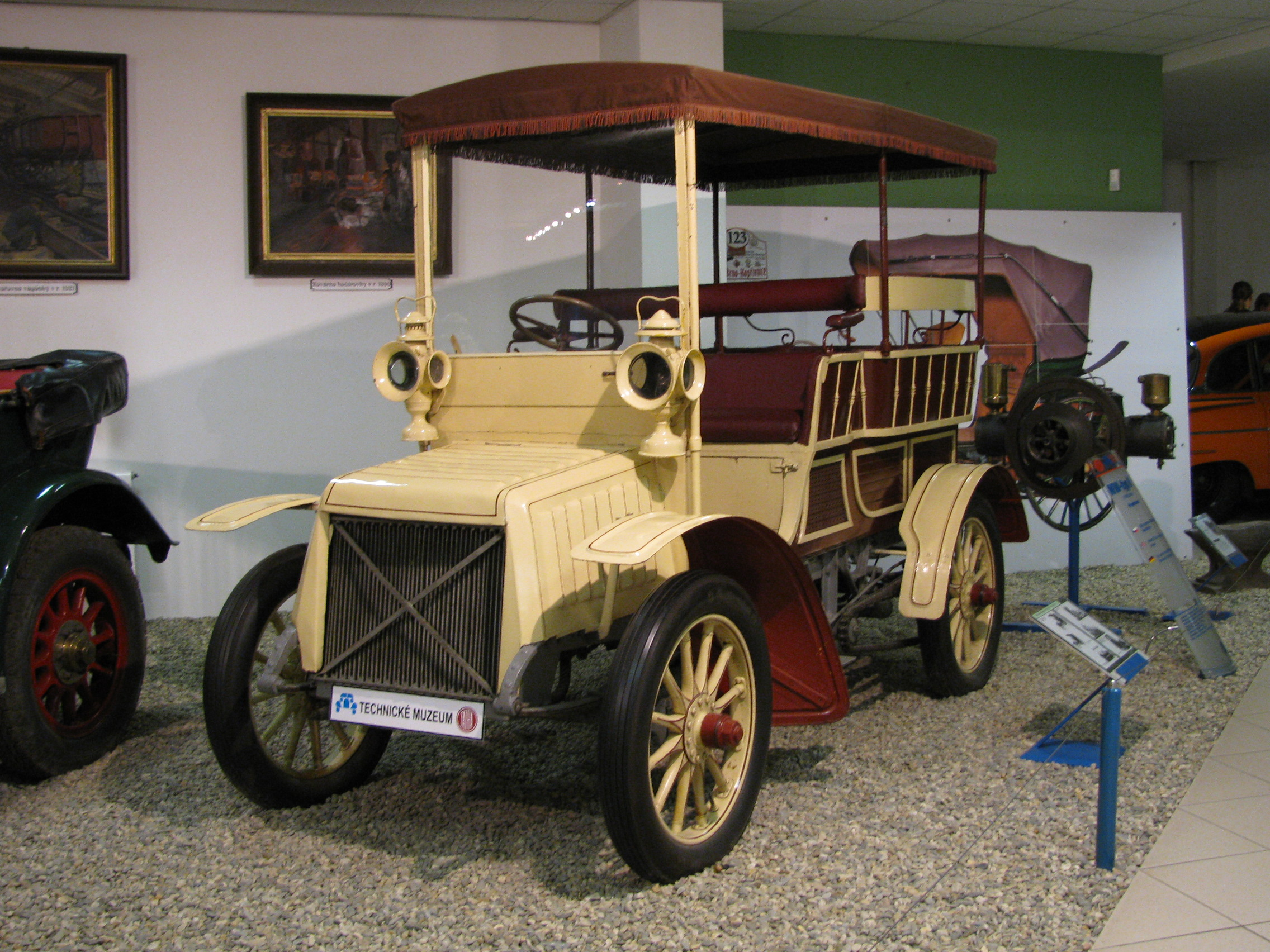

Overview
- Manufacturer: Nesselsdorfer Wagenbau-Fabriks-Gesellschaft today Tatra, a.s.
- Production: 1901 (Neuer Vierer); 1902–1904 (Type B); 46 altogether built
- Assembly: Kopřivnice, Moravia

Body and chassis
- Body style: Runabout
- Layout: Rear mid-engine, rear-wheel drive layout

Powertrain
- Engine: 3,188 cc (194.5 cu in) liquid-cooled flat-twin 12 bhp (8.9 kW)
- Transmission: four-speed (plus reverse)

Dimensions
- Wheelbase: 1,850 mm (72.8 in)
- Length: 3,220 mm (126.8 in)
- Width: 1,296 mm (51.0 in)
- Height: 2,280 mm (89.8 in)
- Curb weight: 1,000 kg (2,200 lb); 911 kg (2,008 lb)-1,080 kg (2,380 lb) (late 1904 model)

Chronology
- Predecessor: NW A
- Successor: NW E

The Nesselsdorf type B is an automobile from the veteran era manufactured by Nesselsdorfer Wagenbau-Fabriks-Gesellschaft (NW, now known as Tatra). Initially two cars were made under name Neuer Vierer (New Fourseater) in year 1901, but later the same car was manufactured under the name type B in 1902 - 1904 (36 made). In 1904 also another variant of the design was made (8 pieces).

The car was initially a four-seater, but later also other variants were made (including 6-seater). The car had rectangular frame, 12 horsepower engine located under the floor, in front of the rear axle. The fuel tank, reservoir for the coolant as well as the radiator were located under the front hood. The steering column with a steering wheel was inclined. The subsequent types C, D, E, F were produced in small numbers. Apart from the E they had flat-four water-cooled engines, transversely mounted, directly under the driver's floorboard.

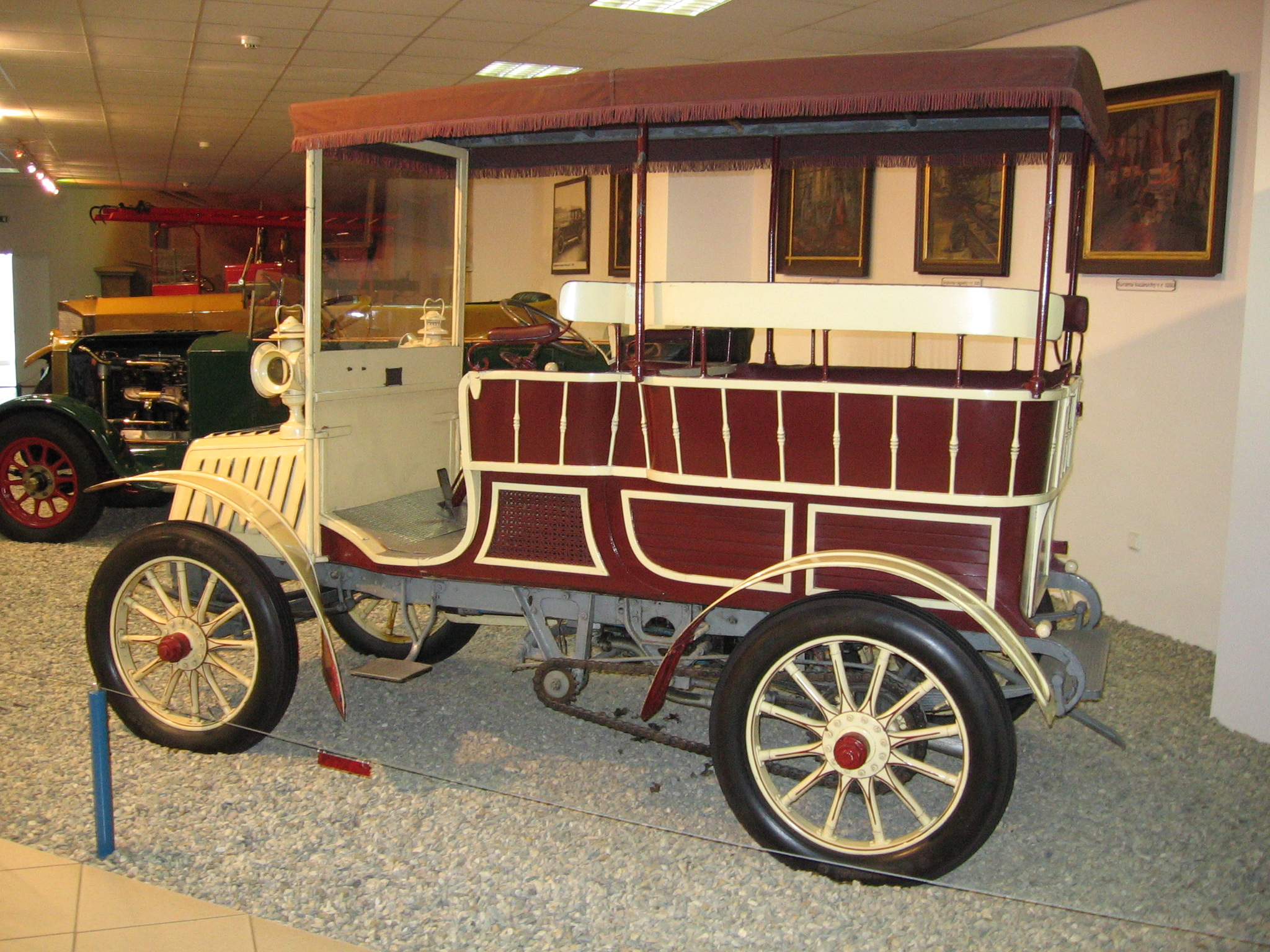
NW B
