= NW First Truck =

Nesselsdorfer Wagenbau-Fabriks-Gesellschaft First Truck
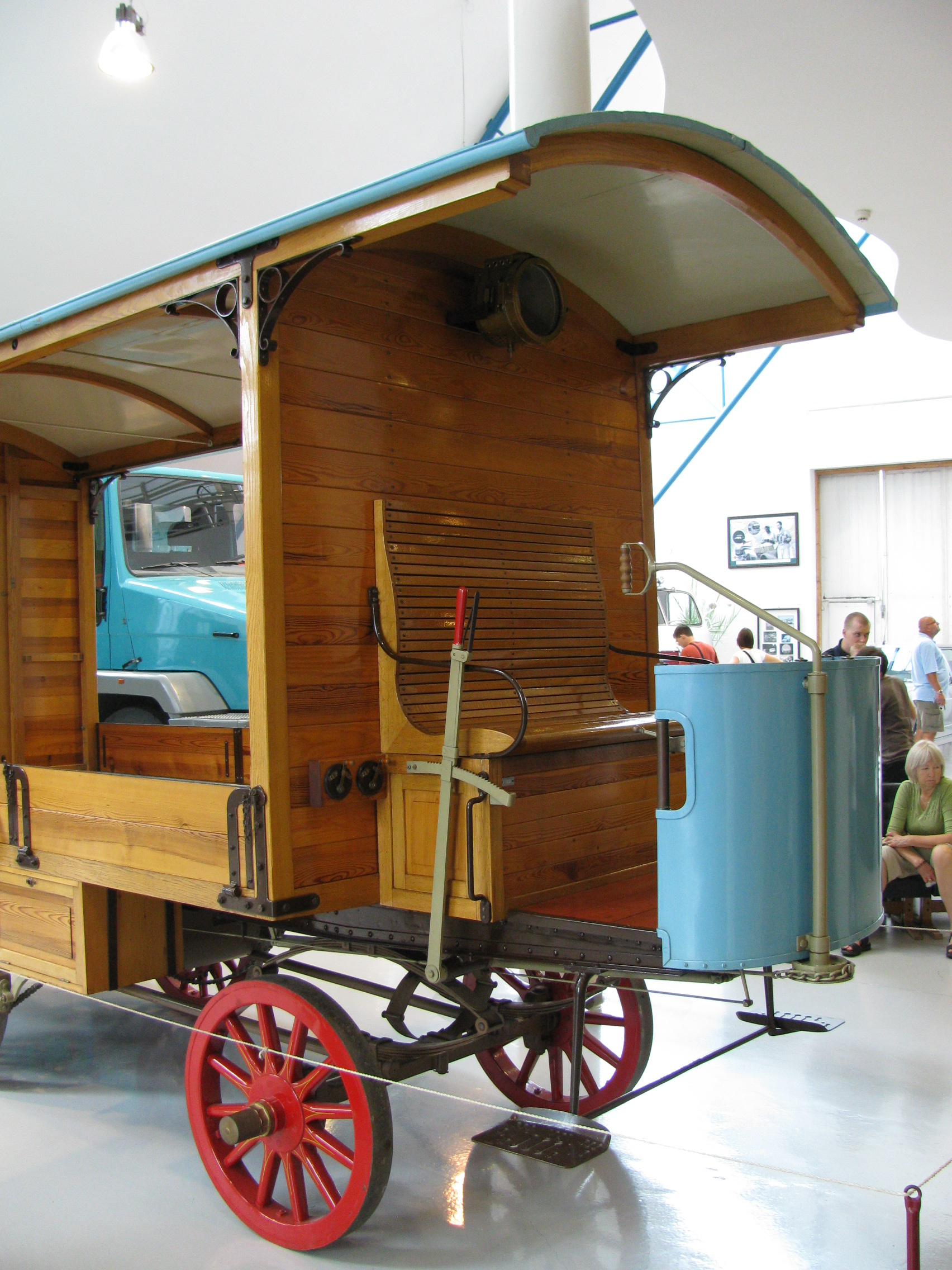

Overview
- Manufacturer: Nesselsdorfer Wagenbau-Fabriks-Gesellschaft A.G. today Tatra, A.S.
- Production: 1899
- Assembly: Kopřivnice, Moravia

Body and chassis
- Class: Truck
- Layout: RR layout

Powertrain
- Engine: 2x 2 cylinder Benz 2750 cc combined power (13.2 HP) at 600 RPM
- Transmission: 3 speeds (+ reverse)

Dimensions
- Wheelbase: 2,000 mm (78.7 in)
- Length: 4,590 mm (180.7 in)
- Width: 1,720 mm (67.7 in)
- Height: 2,805 mm (110.4 in)

Chronology
- Predecessor: Präsident

Nesselsdorfer Wagenbau-Fabriks-Gesellschaft (NW) First Truck is an antique truck manufactured by Nesselsdorfer Wagenbau-Fabriks-Gesellschaft A.G. (now known as Tatra) in 1899. A unique feature of the engine setup was that the two engines could be operated sequentially depending on the load requirements. After the company finished its first passenger car, named the Präsident, it focused on manufacturing a truck. The First Truck represents the beginning of the long tradition of Tatra commercial vehicles.

== Design ==
The truck was a flatbed with covered loading area and with a top over the personnel compartment, which could seat two.

The loading area is 1,720 mm (67.7 in) × 3,510 mm (138.2 in) and had 2,5 tons capacity. There are poles in its corners, which carry the roof. Most of the rear face wall middle part is tiltable (similar to low divided side walls) as a flatbed rear loading ramp. The seat for two is in front of the loading area.

The front axle carries the iron frame via two elliptical leaf springs. The wooden front wheels have steel rims with an outer diameter of 750 mm (29.5 in). The steering column is on the right, in front of the driver. The rear axle is sprung by two pairs of spiral springs. The wheels are wooden with steel rim and outer diameter of 900 mm (35.4 in).

The vehicle has two two-cylinder flat 120 mm × 120 mm liquid-cooled Benz engines (the same as the 1st Präsident passenger car), which are mounted under the frame behind the rear axle. Uniquely, the engines can be operated sequentially depending on the load requirements. The No. 1 engine is started via a cranking handle and has a flywheel attached, and the No. 2 engine, without a flywheel, is connected via a gear clutch and started by the first engine already running. The second engine can be started or switched off any time during the drive.

Another interesting detail is that both engines have vapour cooling: Liquid coolant is vapourized in cooling the engine, and the vapour is led to the roof condenser and the liquid water recycled back into the coolant tanks placed in the vehicle rear, reducing the water consumption.

The gear box is mounted under the frame in front of the rear axle. The gears are changed through two gear sticks in front of the driver. The truck has three gears forward and reverse. It is able to reach 20 km/h. The fuel consumption was 4 kg of petrol per 100 km and it was able to climb a 12° angle.

== The replica ==
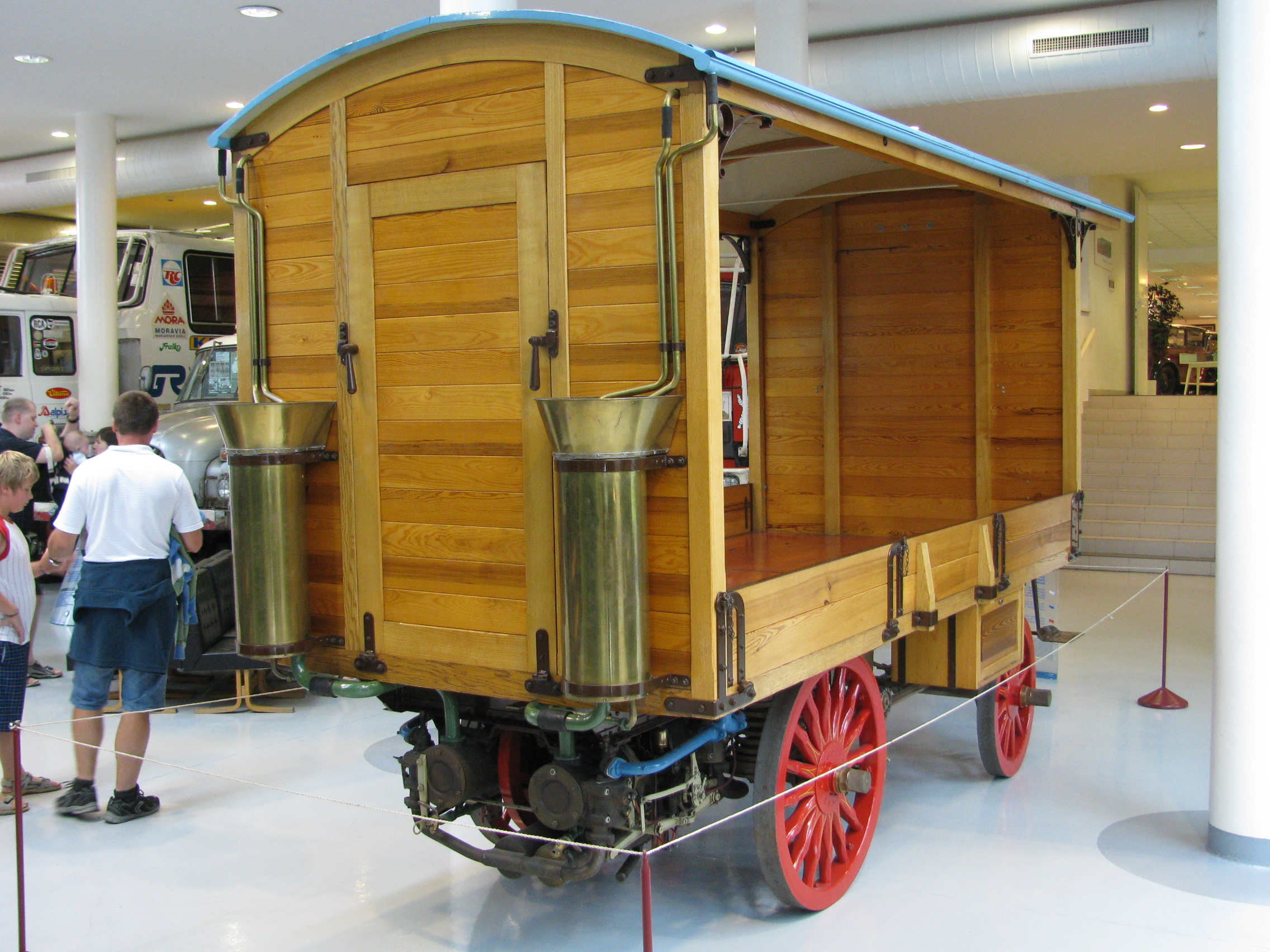
Replica of NW The First Truck (rear view)

Unlike the Präsident, the first passenger car made by NW, the original of the First Truck has not survived. After the work on Präsident passenger car replica was finished in 1977, the decision was taken to build a replica of the First Truck. After all, the main production of the Tatra company were the trucks at the time. However, the task was more complicated than in case of Präsident, as there was also lack of original technical documentation. There was one original photograph of the truck's side view, but this one was made after partial reconstruction of the original. Very important was the photographic tablet of the original technical description, this one was, however, representing a later truck, which was made on May 22, 1900, and which had only one engine (instead of the two installed on the first truck), different gear box and a different steering. Only the concept of the front and rear axles, cooling, the frame and chassis itself were the same. The last source for the project was a description given by a Viennese editor named Adolf Schmal jnr., who described in a newspaper the truck he saw in Nesselsdorf in spring of 1899. His description was very detailed. There were also 39 usable original technical drawings: another 702 had to be made from scratch. The technical drawings for the engine, electrics, and fuel tank were taken from those for the Präsident. The replica is made from 1333 pieces. More than 500 enthusiastic Tatra employees took part in the construction of the replica after working hours. The replica was finished in autumn of 1979. The First Truck replica can by now seen in Tatra Technical Museum in Kopřivnice.
