= Tatra 17 =

Tatra 17; Tatra 17/31
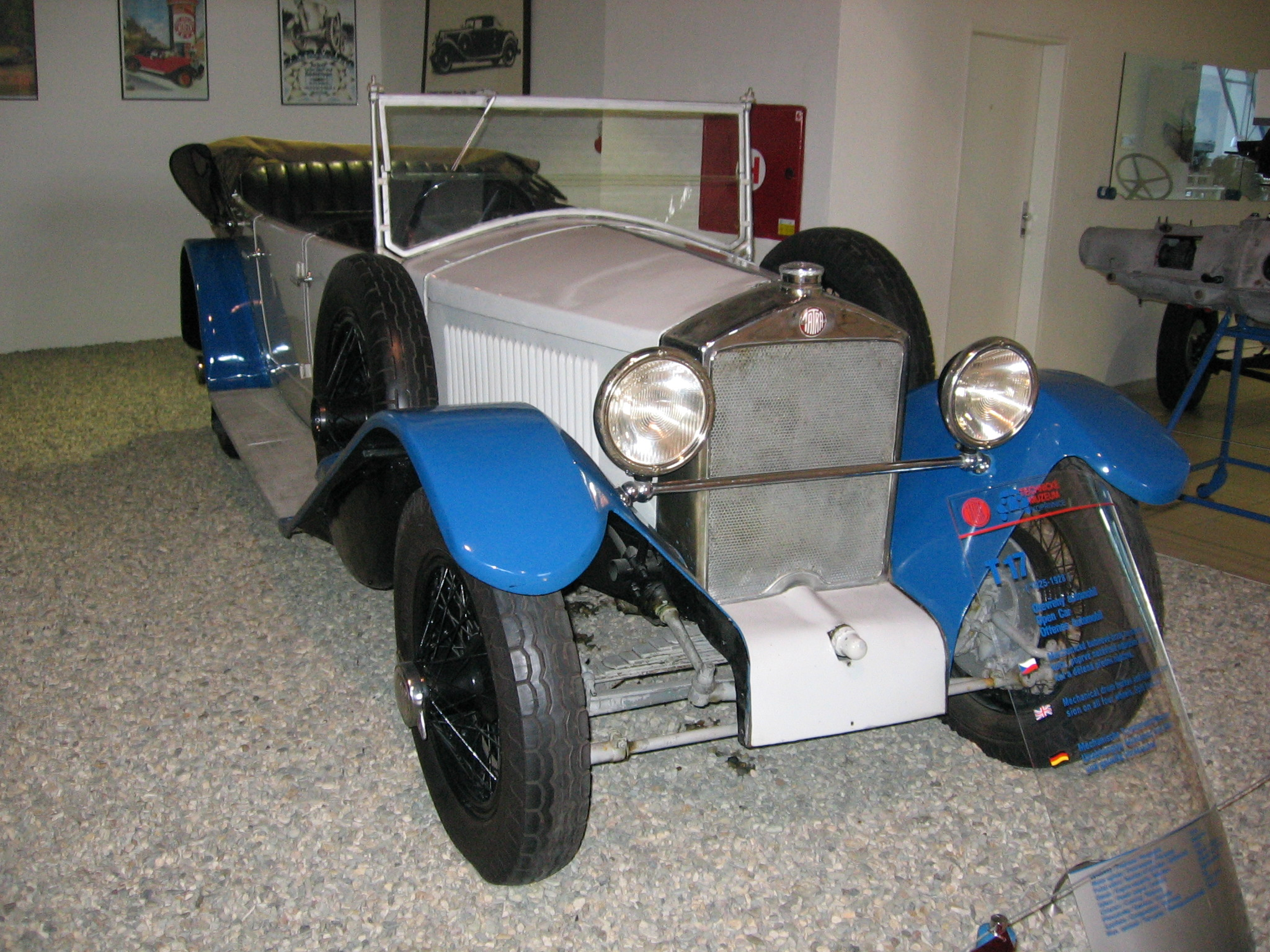

Overview
- Manufacturer: Tatra
- Production: 1925–1929
- Assembly: Kopřivnice, Czech Republic (Czechoslovakia at the time)

Body and chassis
- Body style: 2+2, Roadster, Town car, Touring on Backbone chassis
- Layout: FR layout

Powertrain
- Engine: 1,930 cc (118 cu in) Tatra 17 I6; 2,310 cc (141 cu in) Tatra 31 I6 (T17/31)
- Transmission: 4-speed manual

Dimensions
- Wheelbase: 3,450 mm (136 in)
- Curb weight: 1,300–1,500 kg (2,900–3,300 lb)

Chronology
- Predecessor: Tatra 12; NW T
- Successor: Tatra 31

The Tatra 17 is an automobile produced by the Czech manufacturer Tatra between 1925 and 1929. It was the company's top-end model, and was sold alongside the Tatra 12 economy car and the Tatra 30 executive car.

== Design ==
=== Engine ===
Originally the car was fitted with a liquid-cooled 1,930 cc (118 cu in) six-cylinder OHC inline engine that produced 35 hp (26 kW). The block was made from silumin and the cylinder heads were made from aluminium. It was the first Tatra with an ignition battery. The maximum attainable speed of the 1,130 kg (2,490 lb) car was 100 km/h (62 mph). 205 Tatra 17 cars with this engine were produced before 25 September 1926.

Some Tatra 17 cars were fitted with the engine designed for the more expensive Tatra 31. This engine was also a liquid-cooled six-cylinder OHC inline engine, but was a larger 2,310 cc (141 cu in) design that produced 39.4 hp (29.4 kW). These Tatra 17/31 cars had an increased top speed of 110 km/h (68 mph). 250 Tatra 17/31 cars were produced.

For a time, the Tatra 17/31 was manufactured alongside its successor, the Tatra 31, of which 300 vehicles were made.

=== Backbone tube ===
The Tatra 17 was the first luxury Tatra with a backbone tube, which had been successfully used in the low cost type Tatra 11. Unlike the Tatra 11, the Tatra 17 had independent suspension not only of the rear half axles, but also of the front axles.

The car's driveshaft is inside the tube and the gear box and engine are mounted in the front of the tube, while the differential is in the rear.

=== Configurations ===
The Tatra 17 was produced in several configurations, including a two-seat roadster, and a six-seat limousine.

A few Tatra 17 cars were built in a fire engine configuration. One remains in "service" as an honorary fire engine in the fire department of Svatý Jan nad Malší.

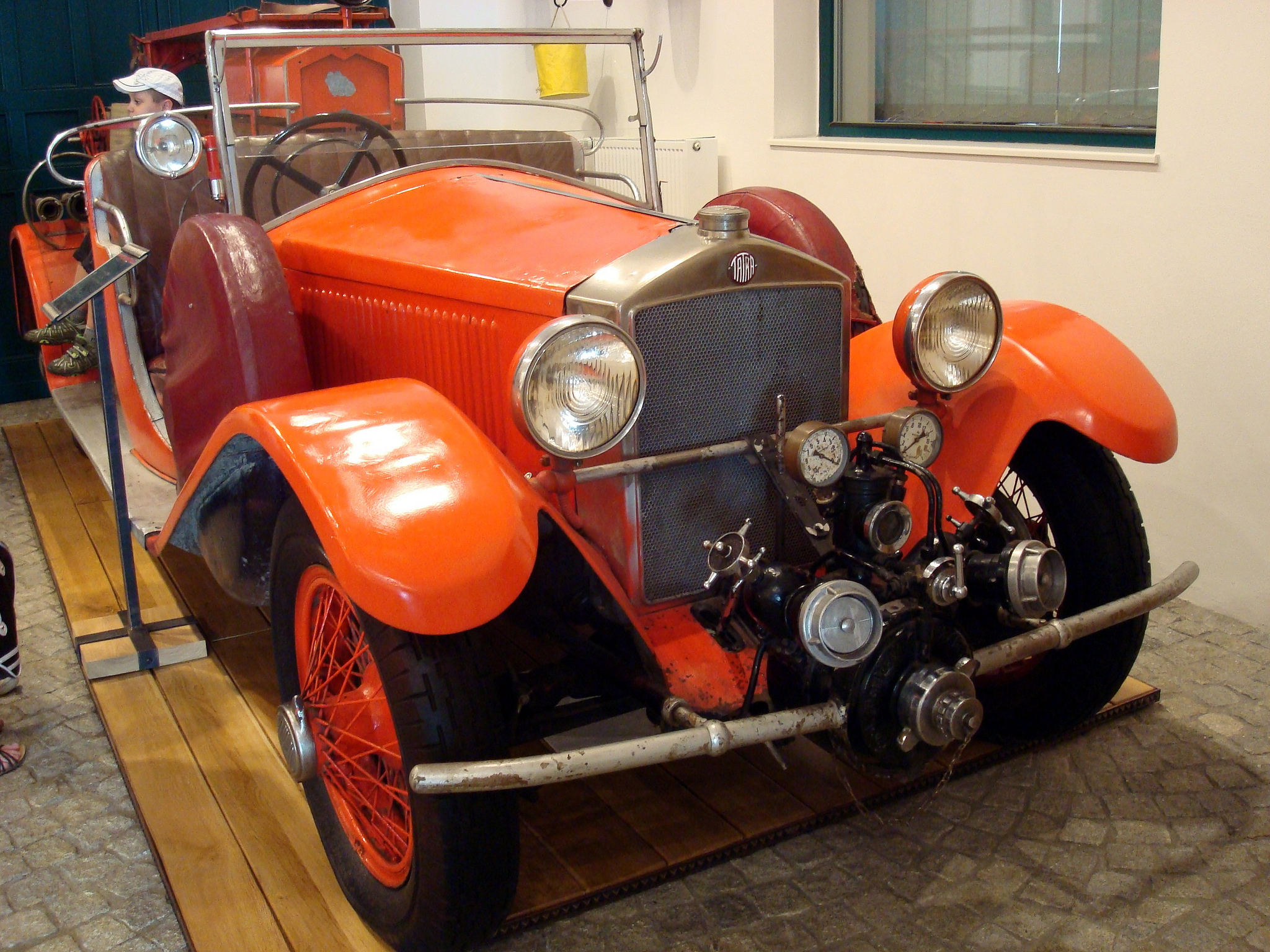
Tatra 17 fire engine

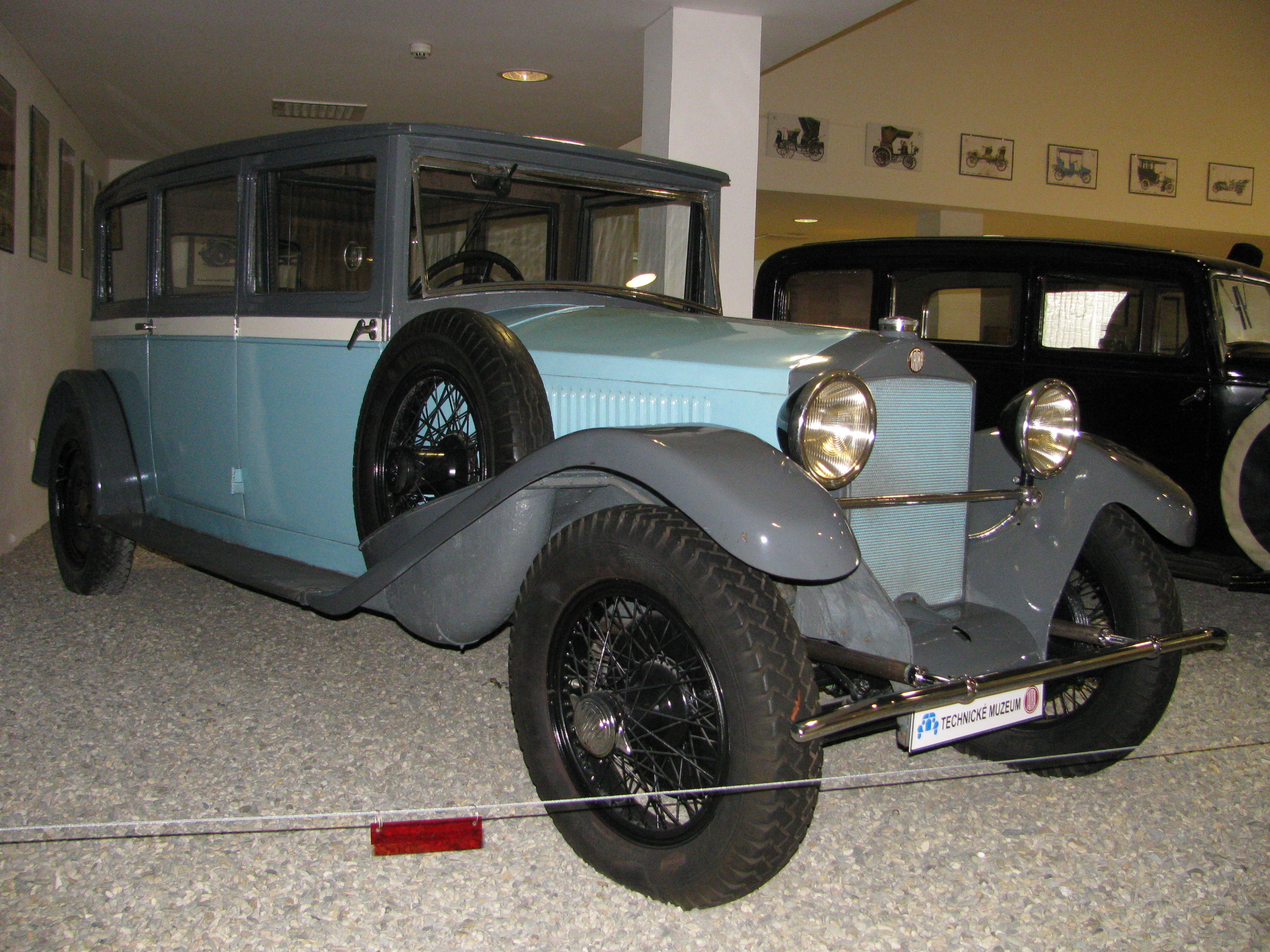
Tatra 17/31

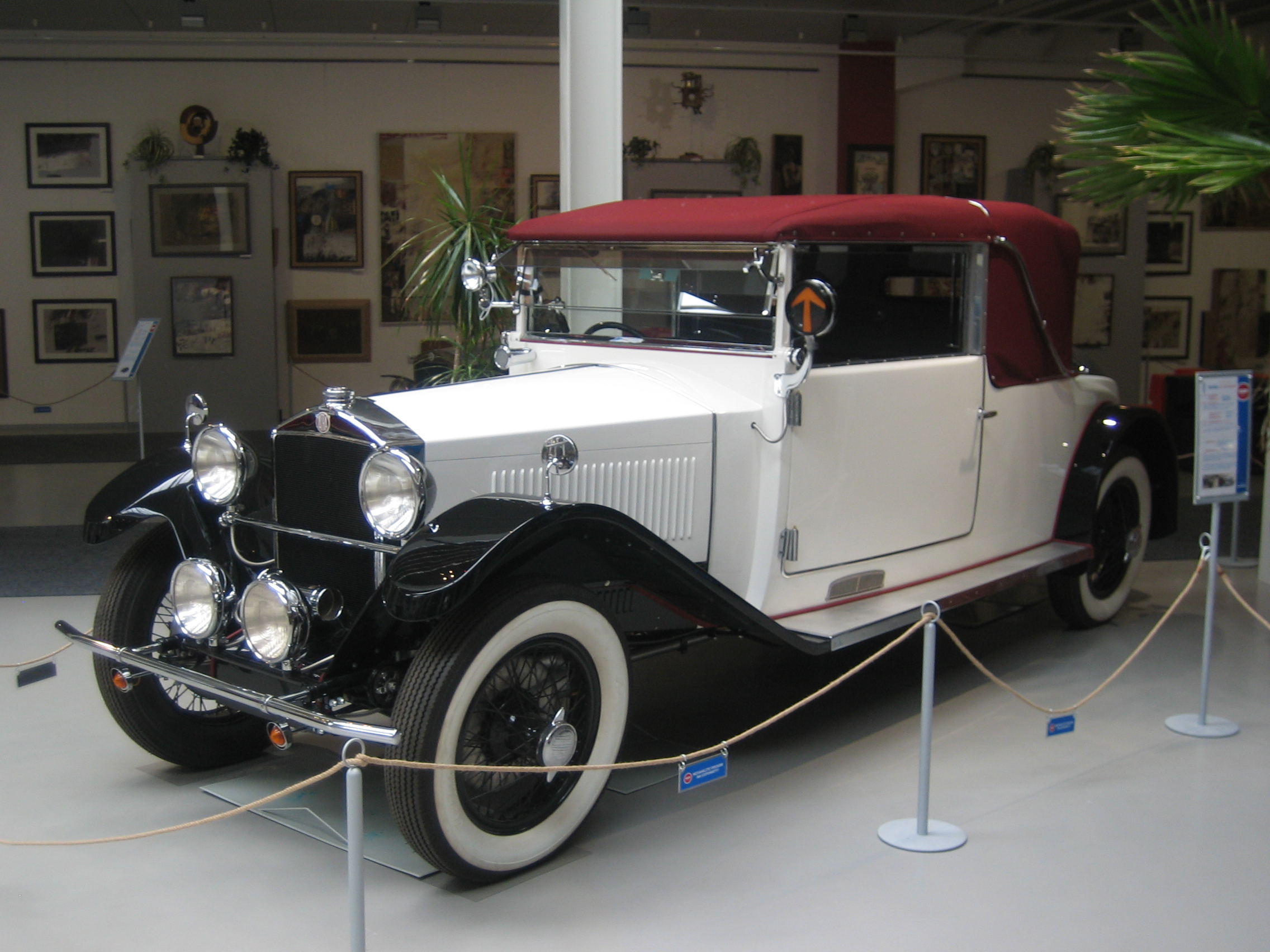
Tatra 17/31 Sport

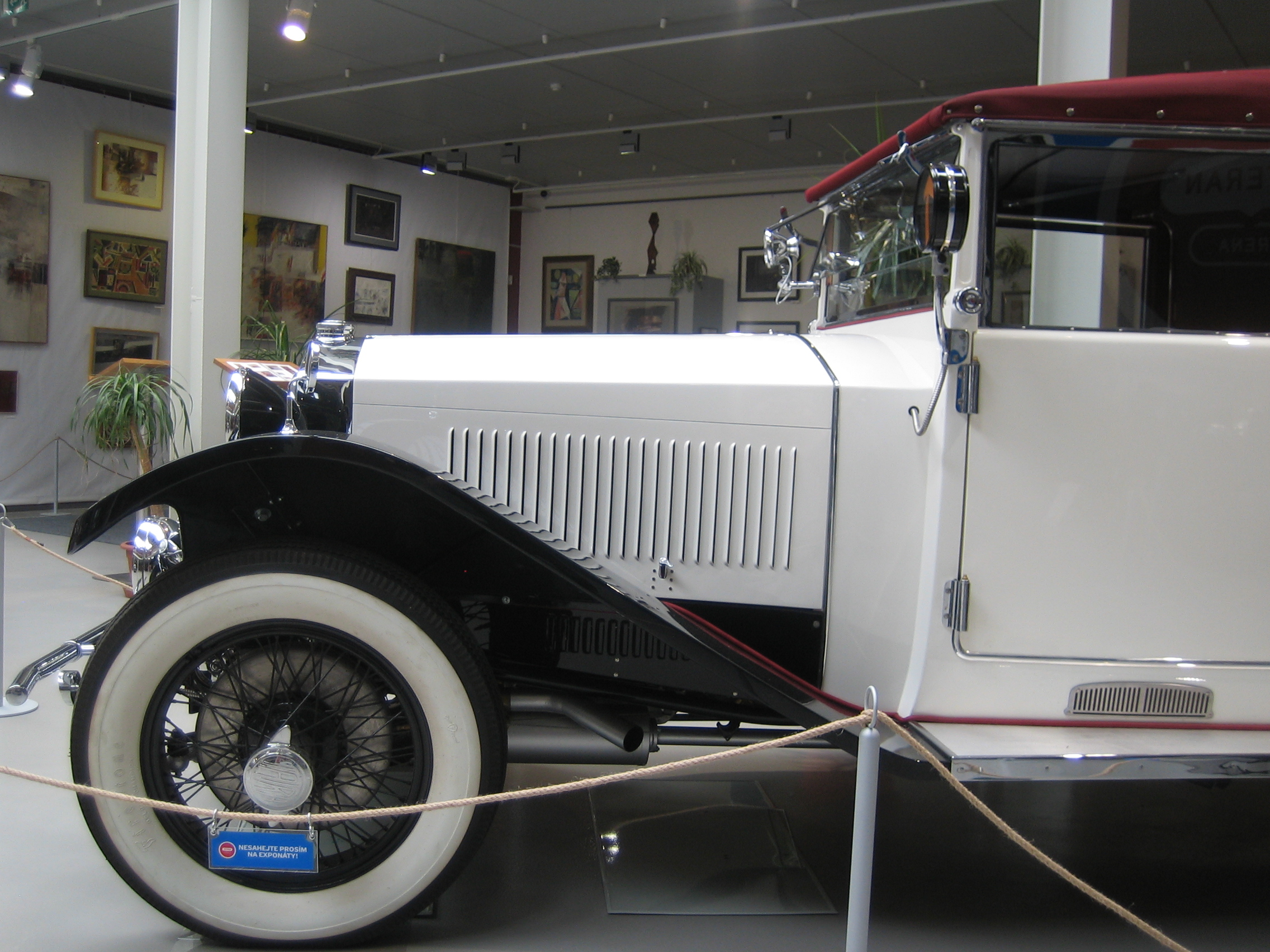
Tatra 17/31 Sport (front left side)
