= Runabout (carriage) =

Open horse-drawn vehicle

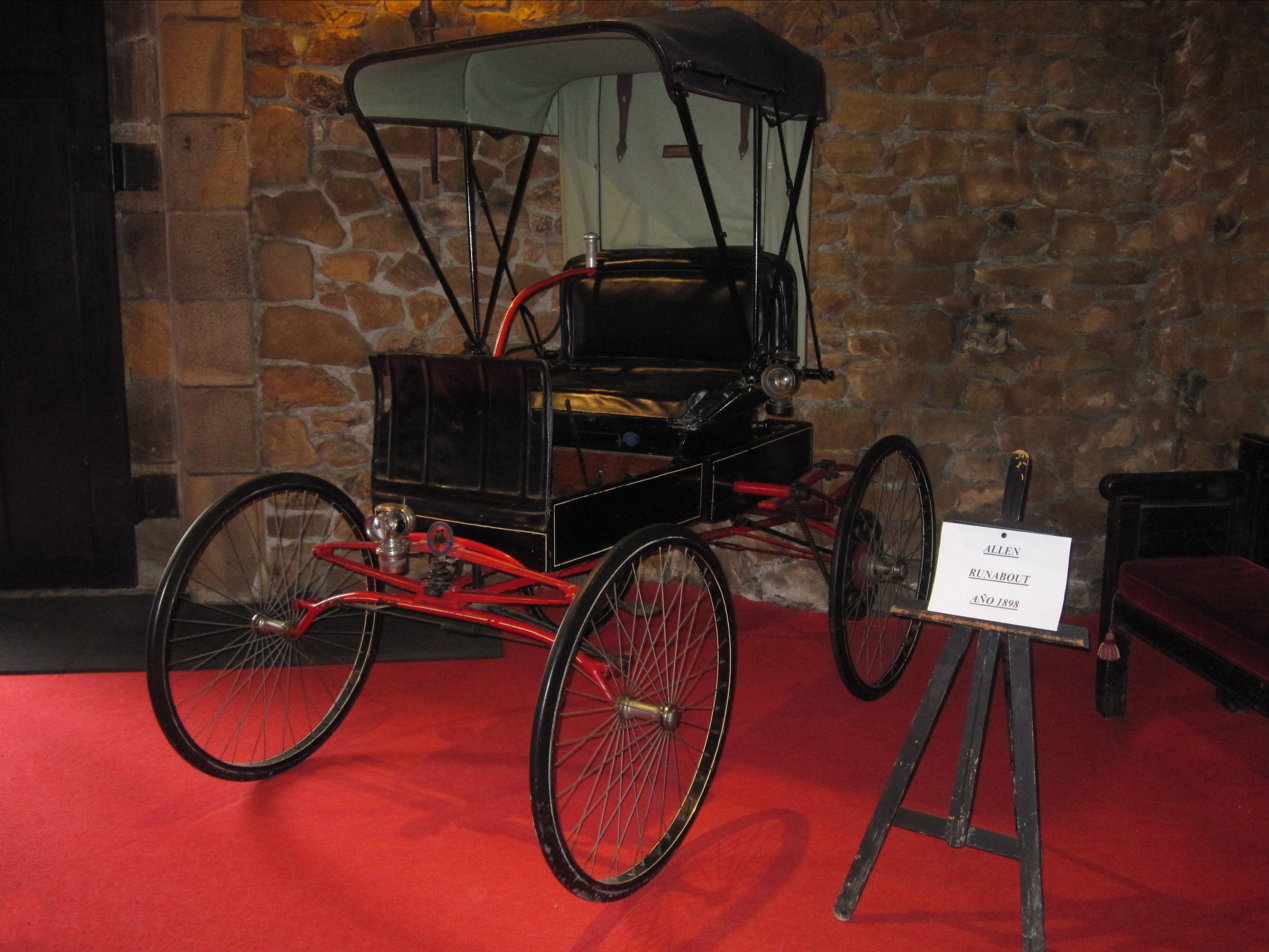
1898 Allen (New York) Runabout

A runabout is an American light, open, horse-drawn vehicle with four large wheels that predated the runabout car.

Similar to a buggy, the runabout was used for informal, utilitarian travel or "running about" on errands.

One type was also called a "driving wagon", made very light in order to be easily hitched by one person, and easily pulled over long distances by a single horse.

A typical example was the light buggy used in the 1890s for daily duties by senior staff of the San Francisco Fire Department. Runabouts could be either fancy or plain, but not encumbered with fenders, heavy tops or optional accessories that added weight.

== History ==
In 1881, Rufus Meade Stivers produced runabout bodies using a patent held by Joseph Tilton. Stivers, a blacksmith and wheelwright, produced the runabouts in his carriage manufactory on East 31st Street, Manhattan, established in 1851.

According to The Carriage Journal,

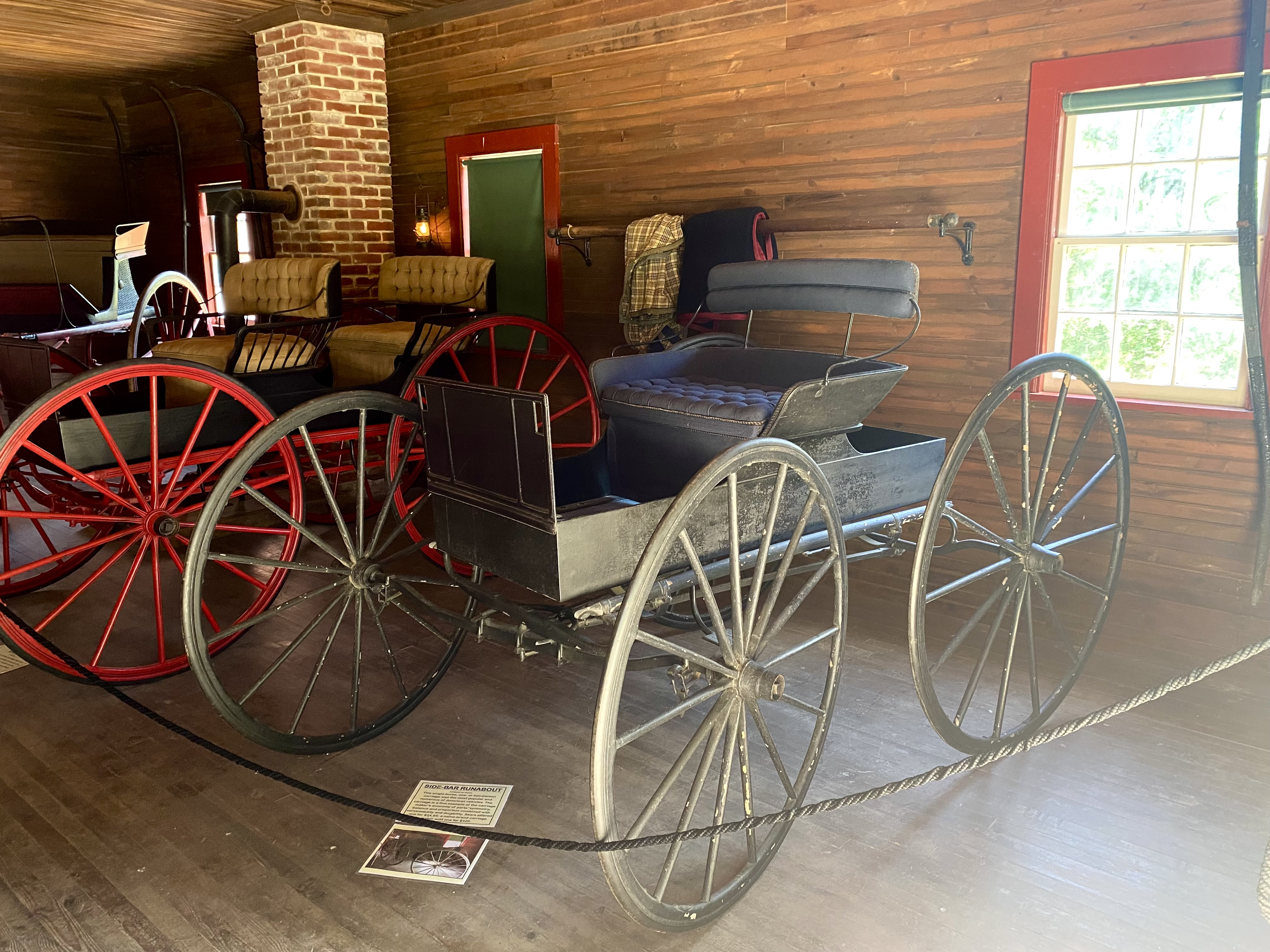
A horse-drawn runabout owned by Caroline Foster, on display in Fosterfields Living Historical Farm.

The special feature of the runabout was that the body was hung low by using cranked axles, and the side-bars were attached to legs at the top of the crank. The original runabout was made without a top, and, besides hanging low which made for steadiness, it was roomy and comfortable.

Stivers patented the "runabout" name and threatened to sue other manufacturers for infringement. However, buggies titled "runabout" were produced by other manufacturers and soon applied to many different shapes without regard to the original meaning.
