= NW S =

NW Type S (18/24, 16/20) Type S4 (20/30) Type S6 (40/50)
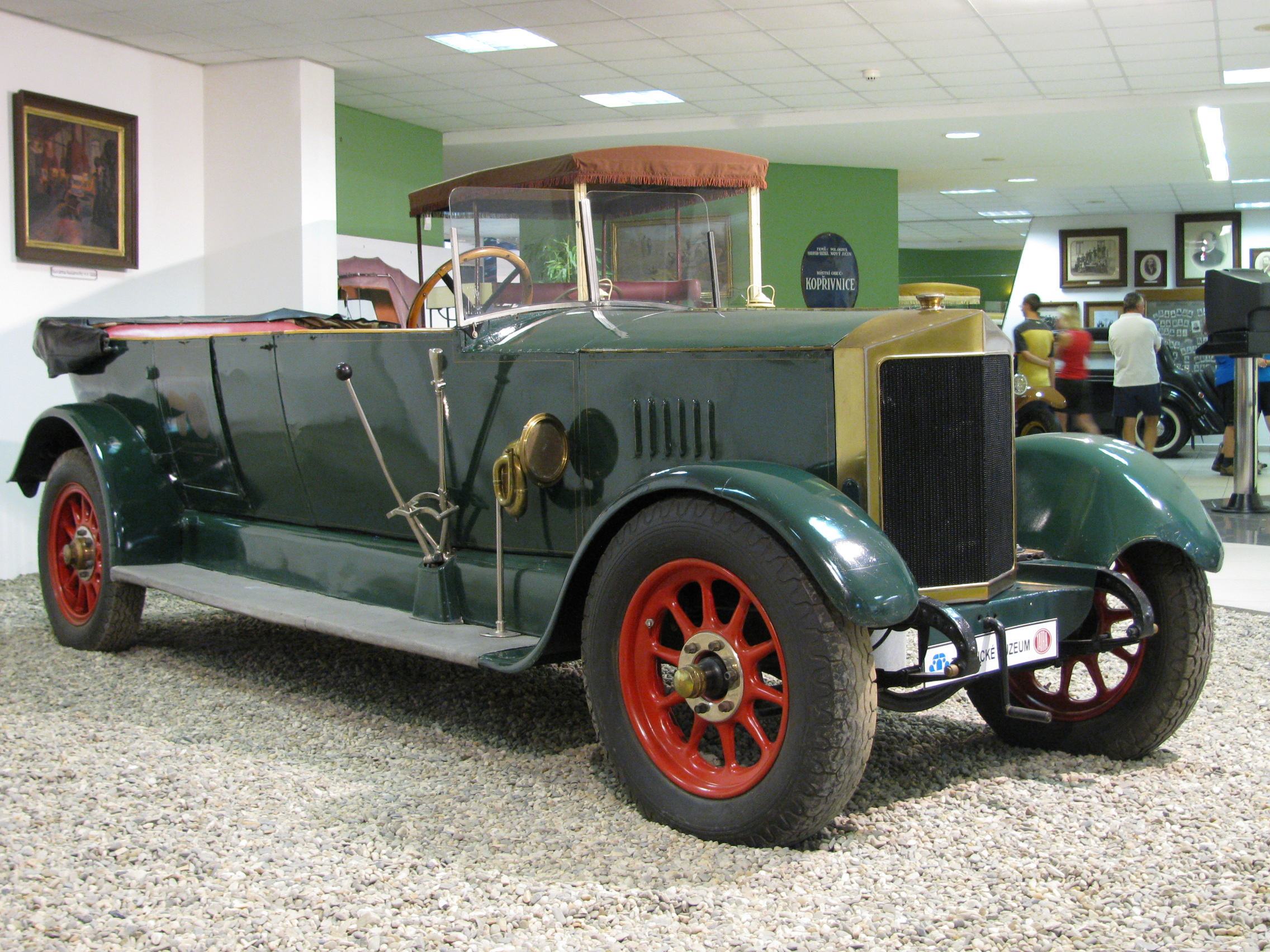

Overview
- Manufacturer: Nesselsdorfer Wagenbau-Fabriks-Gesellschaft A.G. (now known as Tatra)
- Production: S (18/24, 16/20): 1906–1912 S4 (20/30): 1913–1917 (62 produced) S6 (40/50): 1912–1915 (12 produced)
- Assembly: Kopřivnice, Moravia
- Designer: Hans Ledwinka

Body and chassis
- Body style: Diverse four- or six-seaters
- Layout: Front-engine, rear-wheel-drive layout

Powertrain
- Engine: 3.3 L (3,306 cc) I4 (S/S4); 5.0 L (4,959 cc) I6 (S6)
- Transmission: 4-speed manual

Dimensions
- Wheelbase: S (18/24, 16/20): 2,900 mm (114.2 in); 3,000 mm (118.1 in); 3,100 mm (122.0 in); 3,400 mm (133.9 in); S4 (20/30): 3,100 mm (122.0 in); S6: 3,450 mm (135.8 in)
- Curb weight: 1,172 kg (2,584 lb) - 1,290 kg (2,840 lb) (S/S4, depending on bodywork); 1,800 kg (4,000 lb) (S6, depending on version)

Chronology
- Successor: NW T (S4); NW U (S6)

The NW type S was a series of large automobiles manufactured by Nesselsdorfer Wagenbau-Fabriks-Gesellschaft A.G. (NW, now known as Tatra), in Moravia, in what was then Austria-Hungary.

Hans Ledwinka, who left the company in 1902, was hired back in 1905. Immediately, he started working on a new car with a modern and progressive design. Some of the new features included overhead valves, actuated by overhead camshaft (OHC), and hemispherical combustion chamber. The water-cooled engine was mounted at three points and the engine block had large service access doors. The engine and the gearbox formed one unit, the monoblock.

The gearbox itself was of a bell shape with only five gears. Two of the gears were ring type with teeth on the inside surface. Individual speeds were engaged by moving the gears radially. The rear axle was driven by a drive shaft in lieu of chains.

The S4 and S6 with four- and six-cylinder engines, respectively, were able to reach maximum speeds of 80 km/h and 100 km/h (50/62 mph). The S 18/24 and 16/20 models developed 20 PS (14.7 kW), while the S4 20/30 offered 30 PS (22.1 kW). The later, six-cylinder S6 40/50 version was an S4 with two cylinders added; it produced 50 PS (36.8 kW) and was introduced in 1910. The total production of both models was 74 units.
