= NW J =

Nesselsdorf Type J
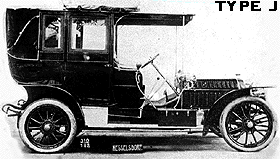

Overview
- Manufacturer: Nesselsdorfer Wagenbau-Fabriks-Gesellschaft A.G. today Tatra, a.s.
- Production: 1906 (J (30), 2+1 produced); 1907 – 1908 (J (40), 4 produced); 1910 – 1911 (J (40) about 15 produced) about 22 produced (Exact number of 1910–1911 production is not known)
- Assembly: Kopřivnice, Moravia

Body and chassis
- Body style: Touring 6-seater
- Layout: Front-engine, rear-wheel drive layout

Powertrain
- Engine: 5,875 cc (358.5 cu in) liquid-cooled vertical flat four 22,1kW - 25,7kW (30-35 HP) J (30); 29,5kW - 33,2kW (40-45 HP) J (40)
- Transmission: four speeds (+reverse)

Dimensions
- Wheelbase: 3,145 mm (123.8 in)
- Curb weight: 1,530 kg (3,370 lb) J (30); 1,550 kg (3,420 lb) J (40)

Chronology
- Predecessor: NW C
- Successor: NW T

The NW type J is a veteran automobile manufactured by Nesselsdorfer Wagenbau-Fabriks-Gesellschaft A.G. ("NW", now known as "Tatra"). Two basic versions are recognized - the initial "J (30)" with a 30 HP engine, and the later "J (40)" with a 40 HP engine. As well as types "K" and "L", it had upright four-cylinder engines of side-valve design. The engines in the three types were rather heavy, 4 to 5 liters.

The car was able to reach a speed of 80 km/h.
