= Tatra 20 =

Nesselsdorf type T Tatra 20
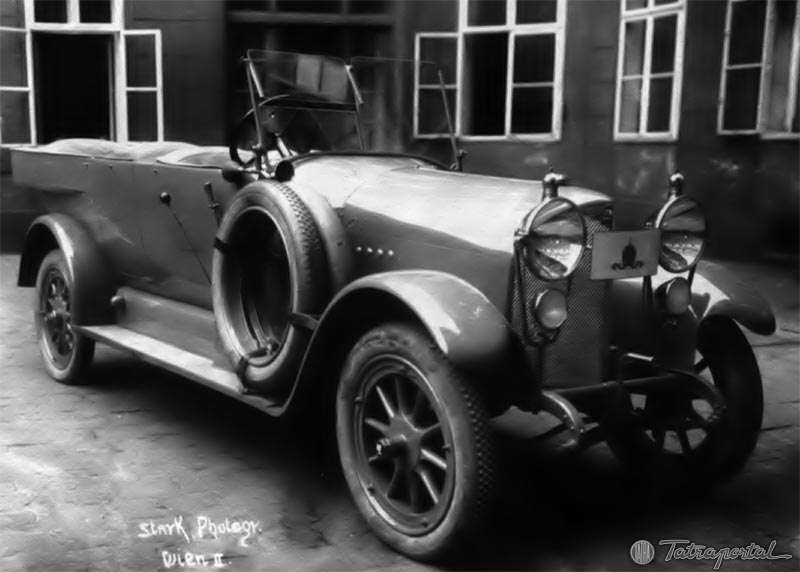

Overview
- Manufacturer: Nesselsdorfer Wagenbau-Fabriksgesellschaft; Tatra
- Also called: NW T (1914–1919)
- Production: 1914–1926
- Assembly: Kopřivnice, Austria-Hungary (1914–1918); Czechoslovakia (1918–1926)

Body and chassis
- Class: FR layout
- Body style: Roadster; Town car; Touring

Powertrain
- Engine: 3.6L (3563 cc) NW T I4
- Transmission: 4-speed manual

Dimensions
- Curb weight: 1,600 kg (3,527 lb)

Chronology
- Predecessor: NW S
- Successor: Tatra 17

Nesselsdorf (NW) type T was a luxury car. As the company changed its name the model was renamed to Tatra 20 in 1919. It was successor to the highly successful model NW type S. It was made at the same time as NW type U until 1925, when both of the models were replaced by Tatra 17. It is currently a vintage model, with only three examples known to exist. BMW owns one, while another is owned by a U.S. car collector.

== Design ==
=== Engine ===
The engine NW T was a four stroke OHC water cooled inline four. It had a capacity of 3563 cc, which gave an output of 33 kW (45 PS; 44 hp). The first T20s had to be started manually while later T20s had Bosch electric starters. The same engine was also used in NW TL-2 and NW TL-4 trucks.

=== Chassis ===
The car had solid front and rear axles suspended on leaf springs and rear wheel drive.

== Versions ==
The car was gradually modernized - for instance, the manual starter was replaced by an electrical one, the gearstick was moved inside the car, front brakes were added, etcetera. It was sold mostly as a luxurious limousine, although other variants were also made, such as an ambulance and a racing version.

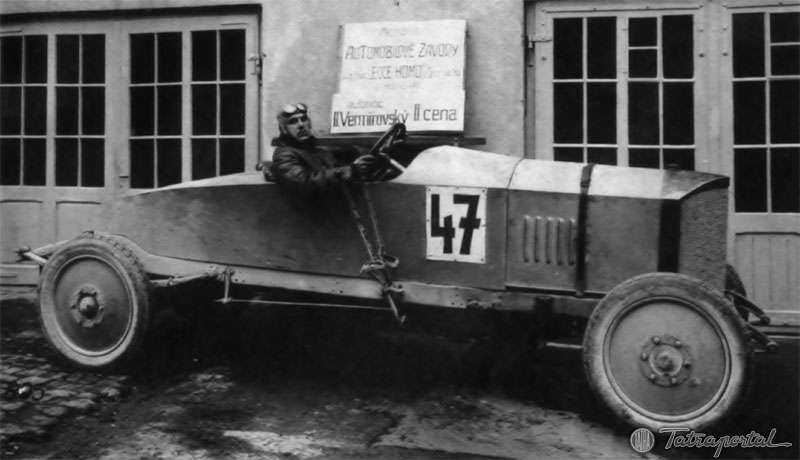
Racecar

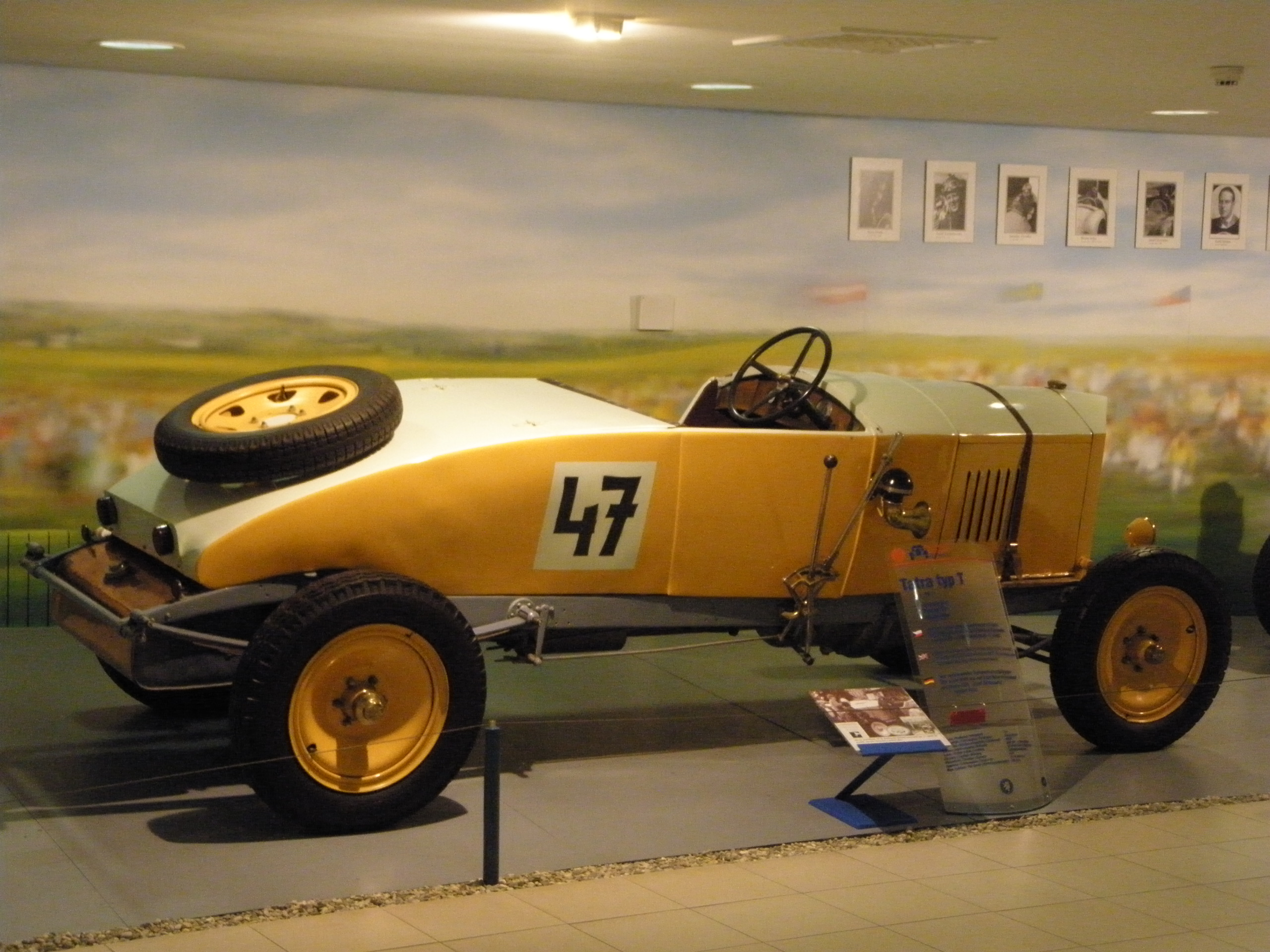
Tatra 20 racecar in Tatra museum

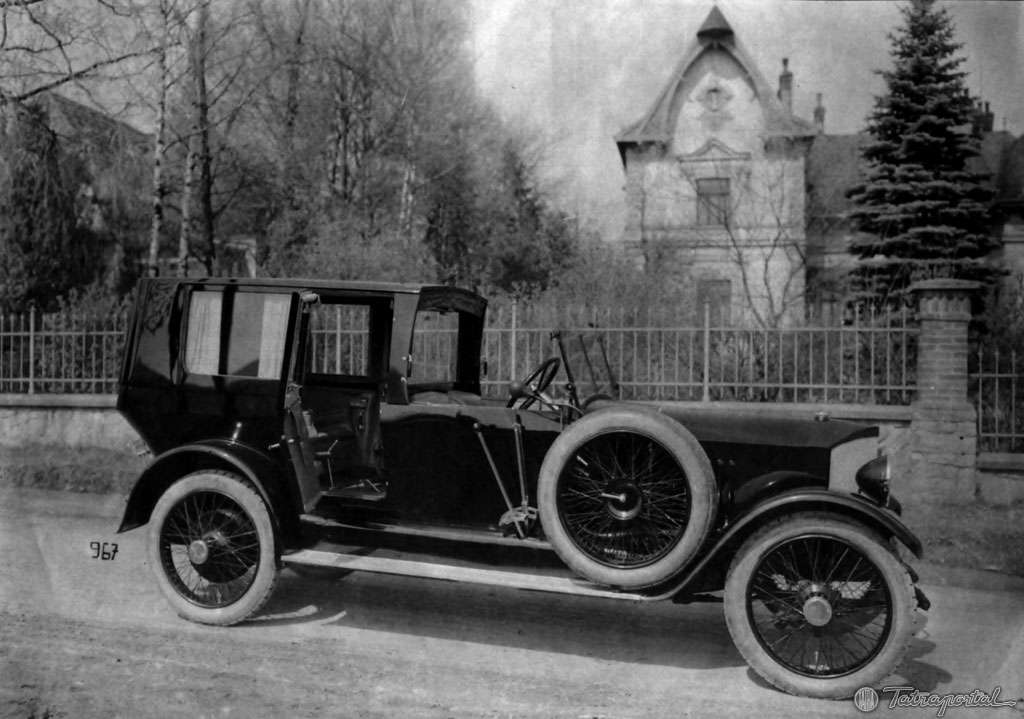
Luxury limousine

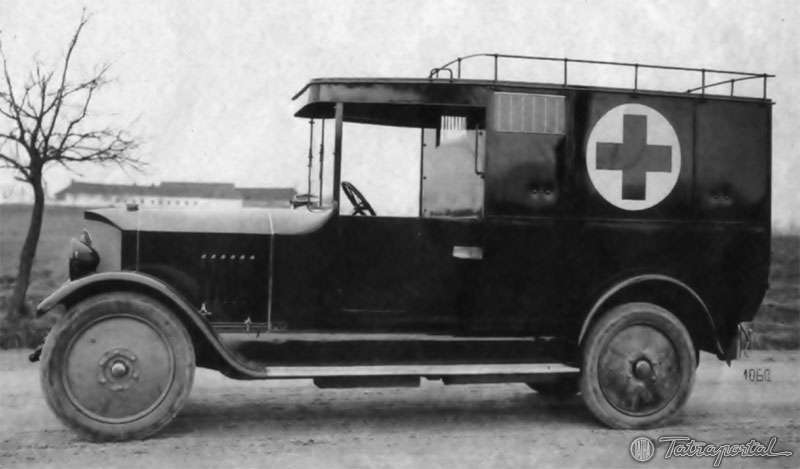
Ambulance car

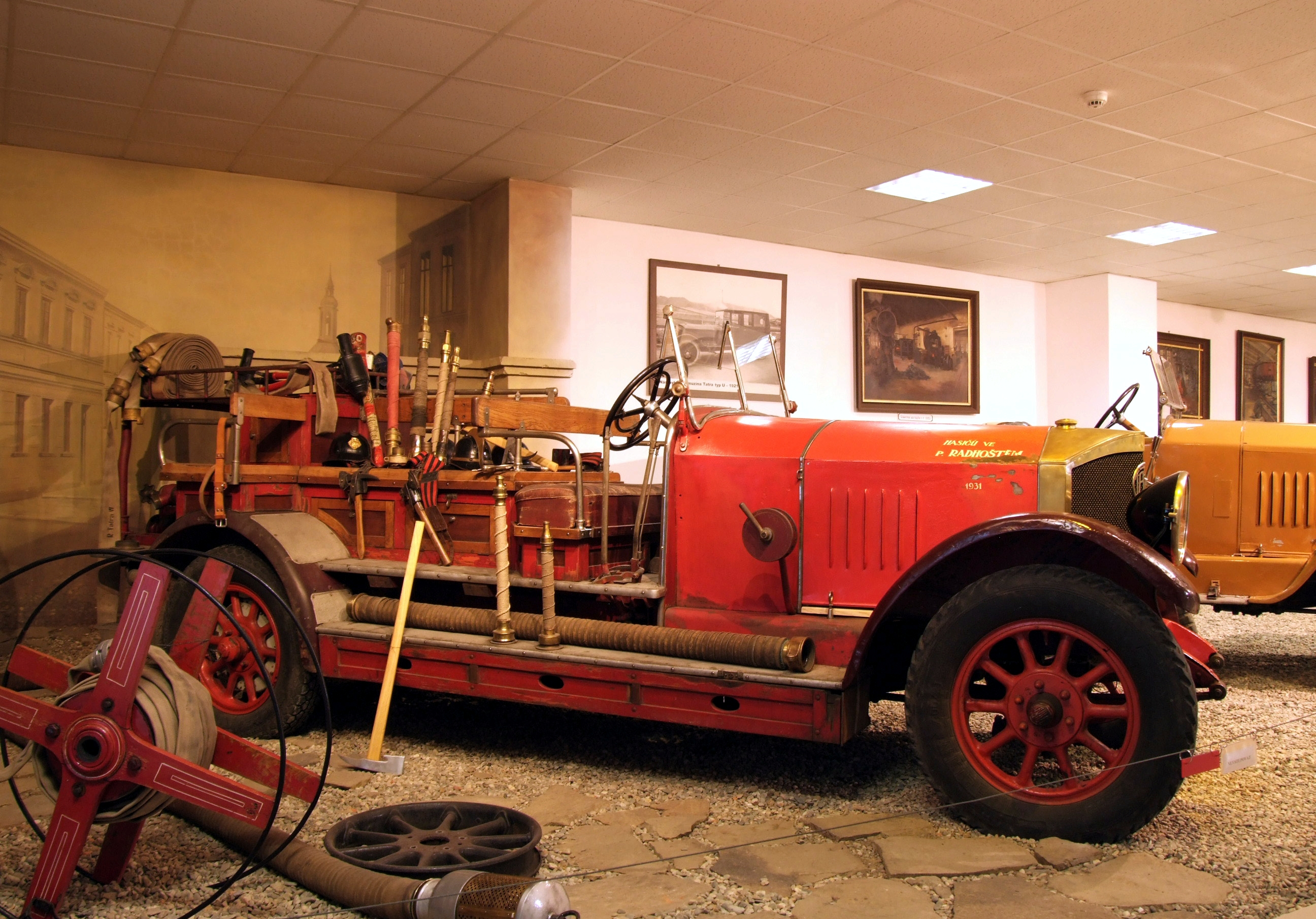
Firefighting truck
