= Runabout (car) =

Antique car body style, and the name of a 1964 concept car

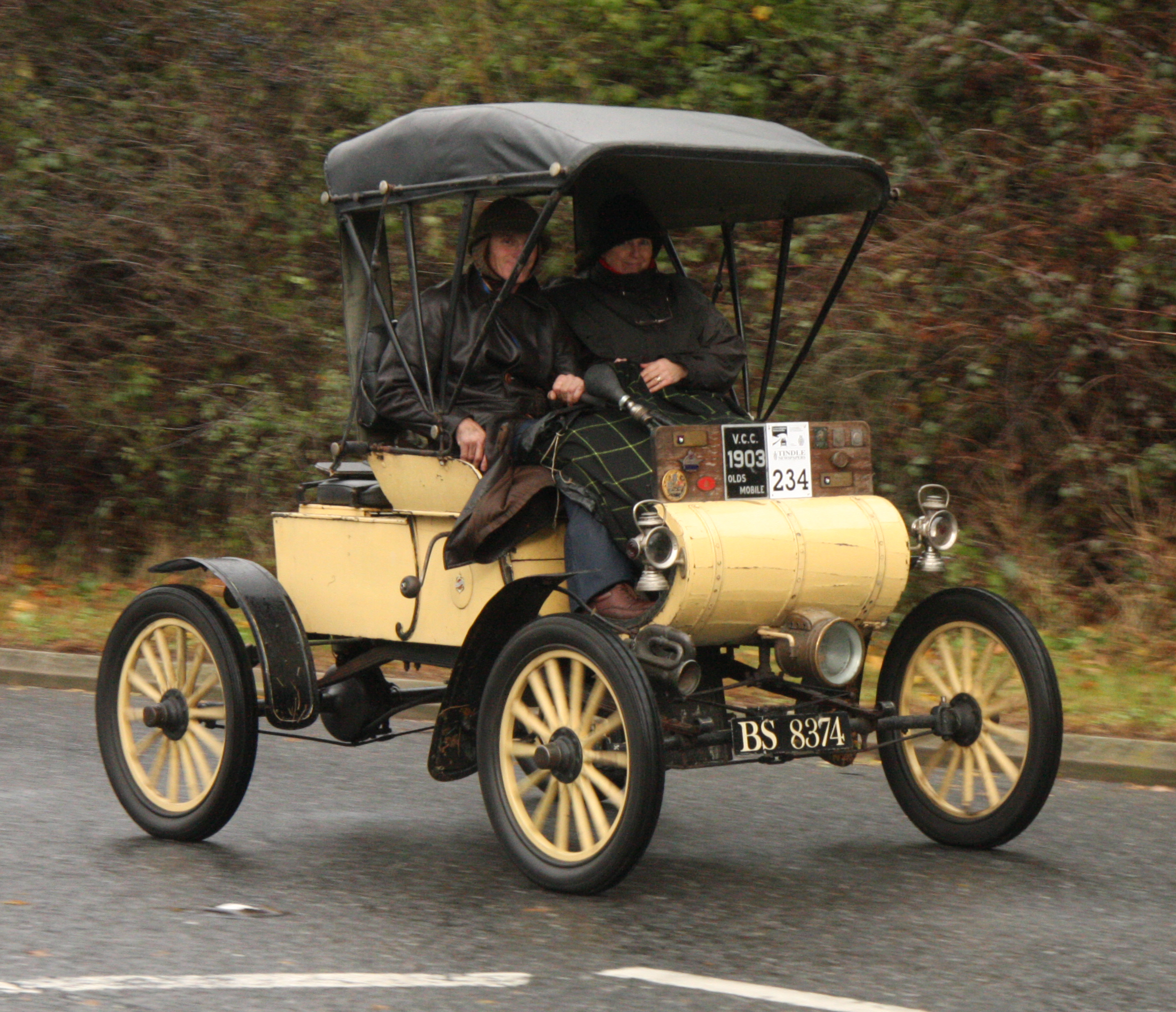
1903 Oldsmobile Curved Dash on the 2009 London to Brighton Veteran Car Run

A runabout is a car body style popular in the 1910s, based on the horse-drawn runabout carriage.

It was popular in North America from 1900 to about 1915. It was a light, basic style with no windshield, top, or doors and a single row of seats. Runabouts eventually became indistinguishable from roadsters and the term fell out of use in the United States. The approach has evolved into the modern "city car".

== Origin ==
Runabouts originated as a type of horse and carriage body.

In 1881, Rufus Meade Stivers produced runabout bodies using a patent held by Joseph Tilton. Stivers, a blacksmith and wheelwright, produced the runabouts in his carriage manufactory on East 31st Street, Manhattan, established in 1851.

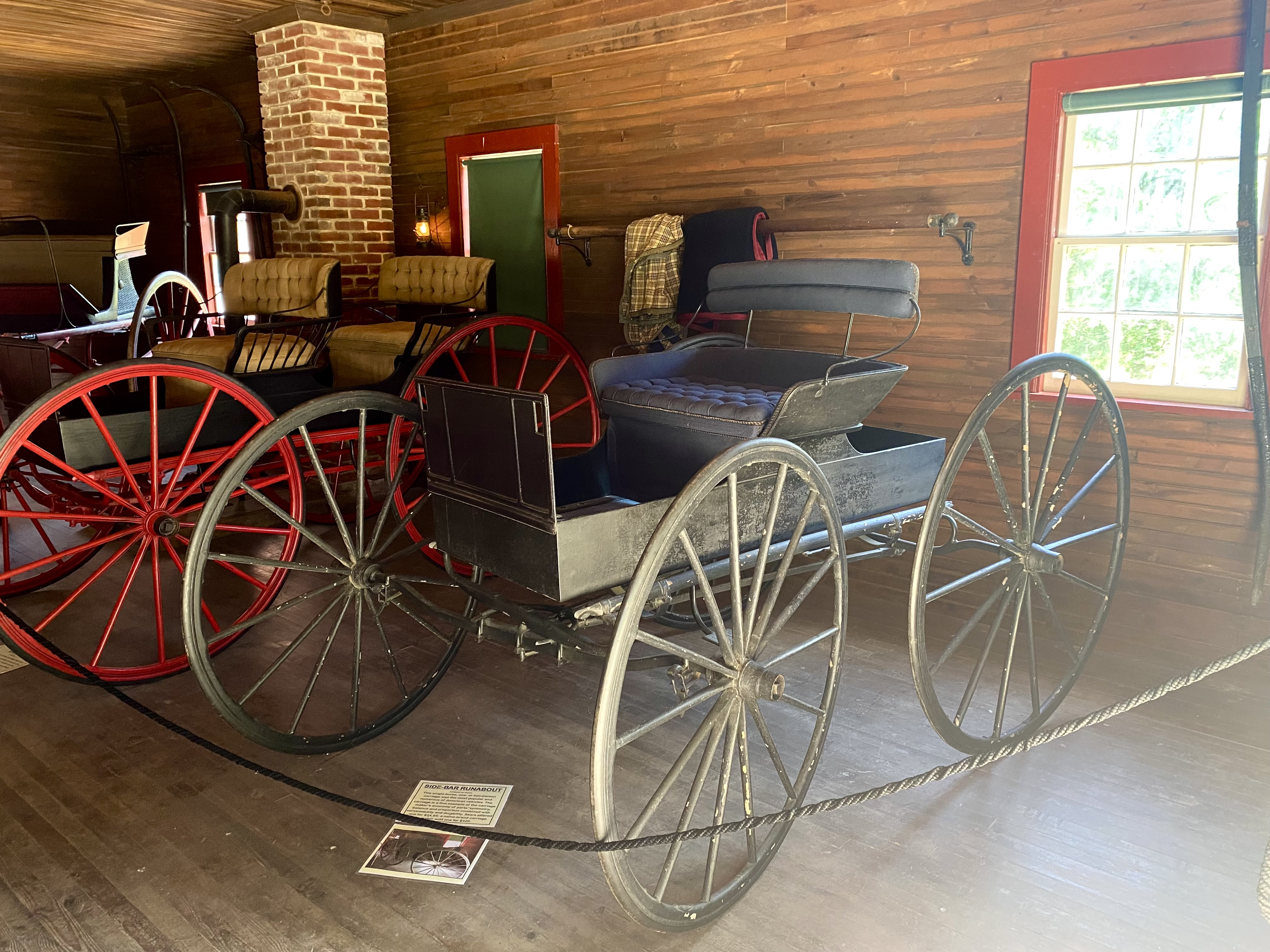
A horse-drawn runabout owned by Caroline Foster, on display in Fosterfields Living Historical Farm

According to The Carriage Journal,

The special feature of the runabout was that the body was hung low by using cranked axles, and the side-bars were attached to legs at the top of the crank. The original runabout was made without a top, and, besides hanging low which made for steadiness, it was roomy and comfortable.

Stivers patented the "runabout" name and threatened to sue other manufacturers for infringement. However, buggies called "runabouts" were produced by other manufacturers and soon applied to many different shapes without regard to the original meaning.

== Description and history ==
The runabout was a light, inexpensive, open car with basic bodywork and no windshield, top, or doors. Most runabouts had just a single row of seats, providing seating for two passengers. Some also had a rumble seat at the rear to provide optional seating for one or two more passengers; those without rumble seats may have had a trunk platform, a box, or a fuel tank instead. They differed from buggies and high wheelers mainly by having smaller wheels.

Early runabouts had their engines under the body toward the middle of the chassis. This sometimes made maintenance difficult, as on the Oldsmobile Curved Dash where the body had to be removed in order to access the engine. The Gale runabout dealt with this problem by hinging the body at the rear of the car such that it could be tilted to access the engine. Some later runabouts had the engine in what became the conventional position at the front of the car.

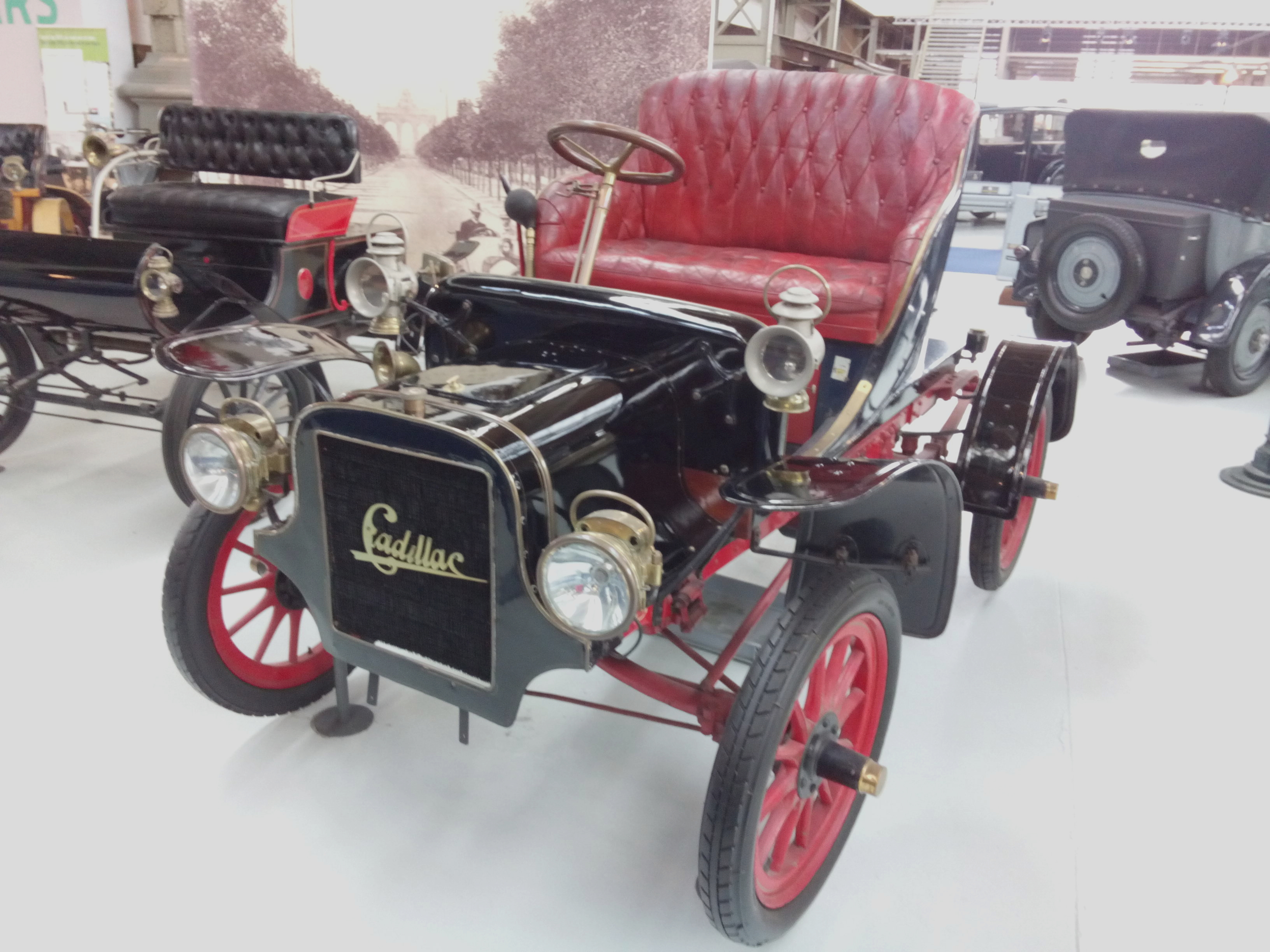
1907 Cadillac Model K at AutoWorld in Brussels

Runabouts were popular in North America from the late 19th century to about 1915. They were designed for light use over short distances. By the mid-1910s, they became almost indistinguishable from roadsters.

Notable examples of runabouts include the Oldsmobile Curved Dash mentioned earlier, which was the first mass-produced car, and the Cadillac runabout, which won the Dewar Trophy for 1908 by demonstrating its use of interchangeable parts.

== Legacy ==
The 1964 GM Runabout was a three wheel concept car first exhibited at Futurama II, part of the 1964 New York World's Fair. The car was designed specifically for housewives and had detachable shopping carts built into it.

The term "runabout" is still in use in the UK, denoting a small car used for short journeys.
