= Mackerle =

Mackerle is a surname. Notable people with the surname include:

- Ivan Mackerle (1942–2013), Czech traveller and cryptozoologist
- Julius Mackerle (1909–1988), Czech engineer and constructor
