= Tatra 601 =

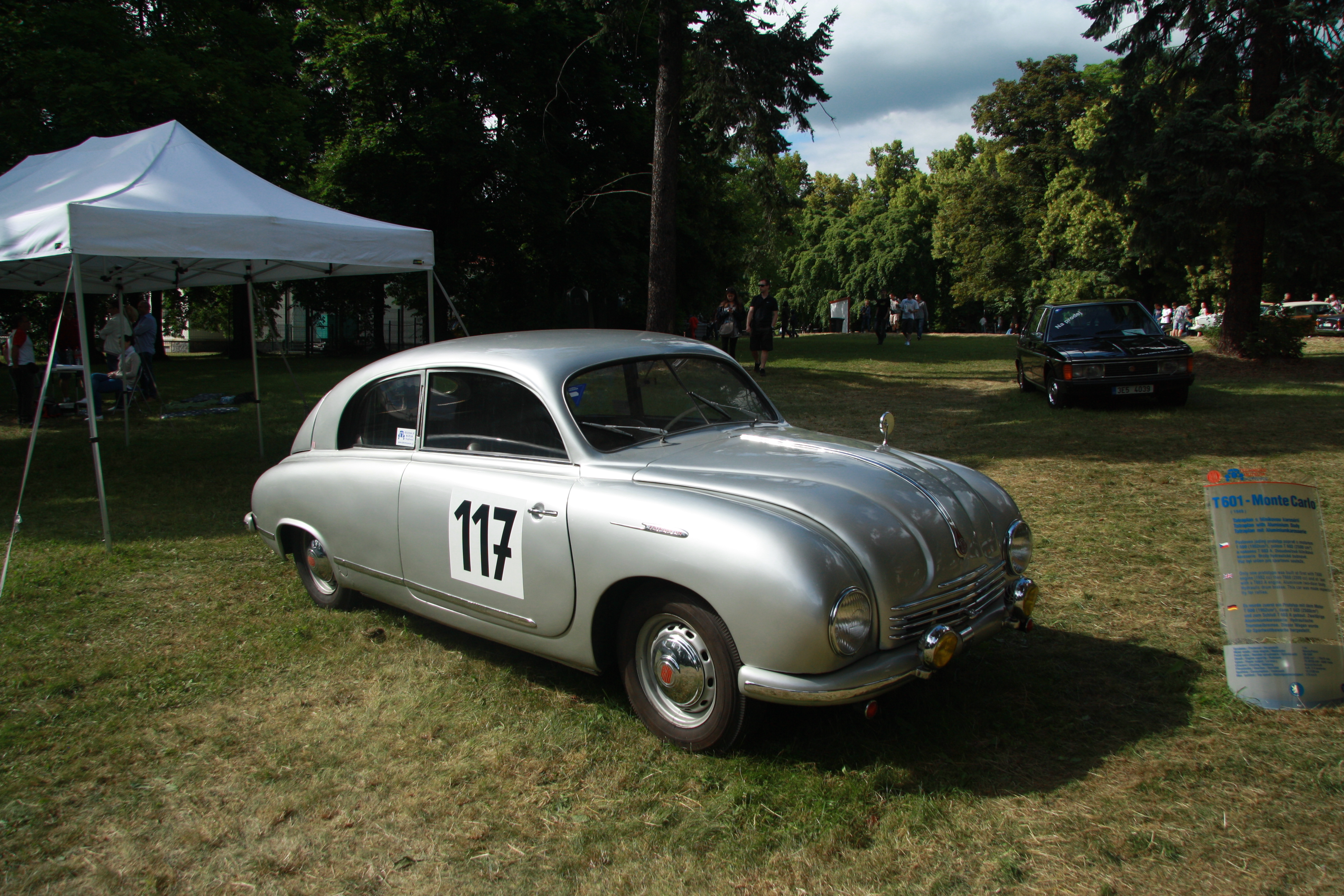
Tatra 601 Monte Carlo at Legendy 2014 car show in Prague

The Tatra 601 Monte Carlo is a vehicle based on the Tatra 600 manufactured by Czech company Tatra and built in 1949. The Tatra 601 Monte Carlo (aluminium bodied) was a two-door sports car with possibly only two units built (only one known to exist). Although the 601 was named after the Monte Carlo race, it never competed in it, but it did compete in the Alpenfahrt Rally.

Several engines were installed in the 601. Initially it was powered by the standard 2.0L Tatra 600 flat four, then a bored-out 2.2L version of that engine, a 2.5L Tatra 900 flat-four and finally a 2.5L V8 from the Tatra 603, which remains in the car to this day.
