= Jevíčko =

- Town
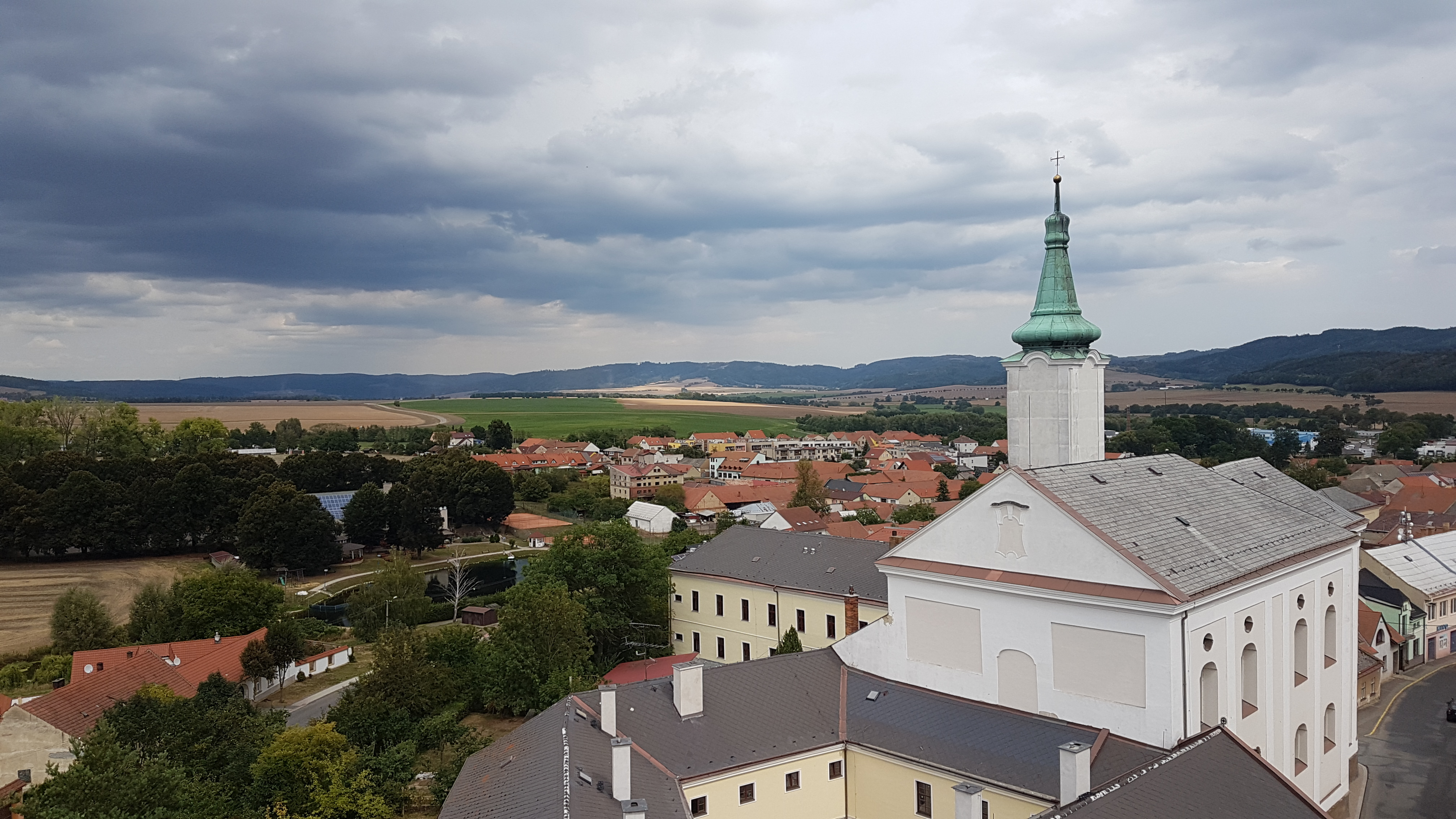
- Church of the Assumption of the Virgin Mary

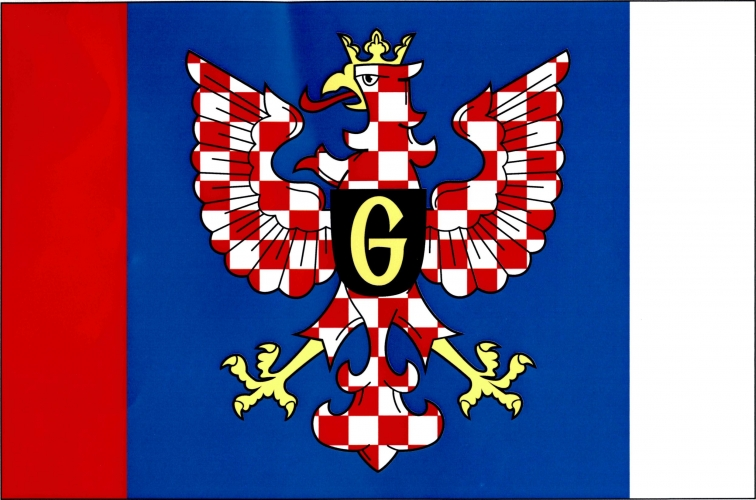
- Flag Coat of arms

- Location in the Czech Republic
- Coordinates: 49°37′56″N 16°42′41″E
- Country: Czech Republic
- Region: Pardubice
- District: Svitavy
- First mentioned: 1249

Government
  - Mayor: Dušan Pávek

Area
  - Total: 23.22 km^{2} (8.97 sq mi)
- Elevation: 366 m (1,201 ft)

Population (2026-01-01)
  - Total: 2,837
  - Density: 122.2/km^{2} (316.4/sq mi)
- Time zone: UTC+1 (CET)
  - Summer (DST): UTC+2 (CEST)
- Postal code: 569 43
- Website: www.jevicko.cz

Jevíčko (Czech pronunciation: [ˈjɛviːtʃko]; German: Gewitsch) is a town in Svitavy District in the Pardubice Region of the Czech Republic. It has about 2,800 inhabitants. The town proper is located on the stream Malonínský potok in the Boskovice Furrow.

Jevíčko was founded in the first half of the 13th century and became a town in 1258. The historic town centre is well preserved and is protected as an urban monument zone.

== Administrative division ==
Jevíčko consists of two municipal parts (in brackets population according to the 2021 census):

- Jevíčko (2,678)
- Zadní Arnoštov (64)

== Geography ==
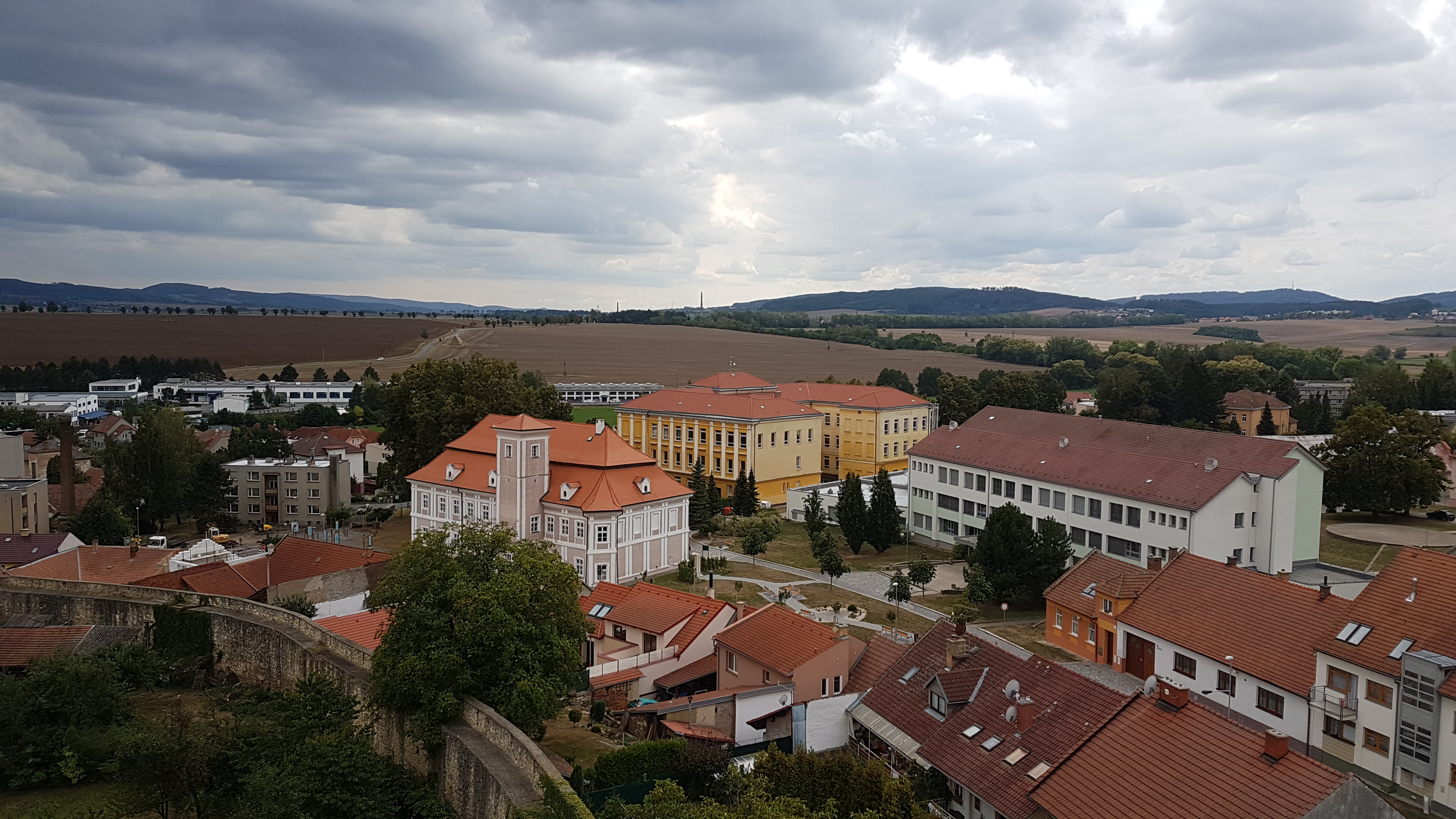
View of Jevíčko with the castle in the middle

Jevíčko is located about 22 kilometres (14 mi) southeast of Svitavy and 47 km (29 mi) north of Brno. The eastern part of the municipal territory with the town proper lies in the Boskovice Furrow depression. The western part extends into the Orlické Foothills and includes the highest point of Jevíčko, the hill Křenovské hradisko at 571 m (1,873 ft) above sea level.

Jevíčko is situated on the stream Malonínský potok. The stream flows into the Jevíčka River, which partly forms the eastern border of the municipal territory. North of the town is the Finsterl Deep, an artificially created body of water with islands and peninsulas serving as a biocentre.

== History ==
Jevíčko was founded in the first half of the 13th century on the trade route from Olomouc to Prague. The first written mention of Jevíčko is from 1249. In 1258, Jevíčko was promoted to a royal town by King Ottokar II. It was owned by the kings until 1499.

The town had a significant Jewish community. The community began to form from the 15th century and in the mid-19th century, Jews made up a third of the population.

== Demographics ==
Historical population

Year	Pop.	±%
1869	3,565	—
1880	3,502	−1.8%
1890	3,319	−5.2%
1900	3,404	+2.6%
1910	3,603	+5.8%

Year	Pop.	±%
1921	3,419	−5.1%
1930	3,426	+0.2%
1950	2,784	−18.7%
1961	2,647	−4.9%
1970	2,526	−4.6%

Year	Pop.	±%
1980	2,754	+9.0%
1991	2,688	−2.4%
2001	2,829	+5.2%
2011	2,886	+2.0%
2021	2,742	−5.0%

Source: Censuses

== Transport ==
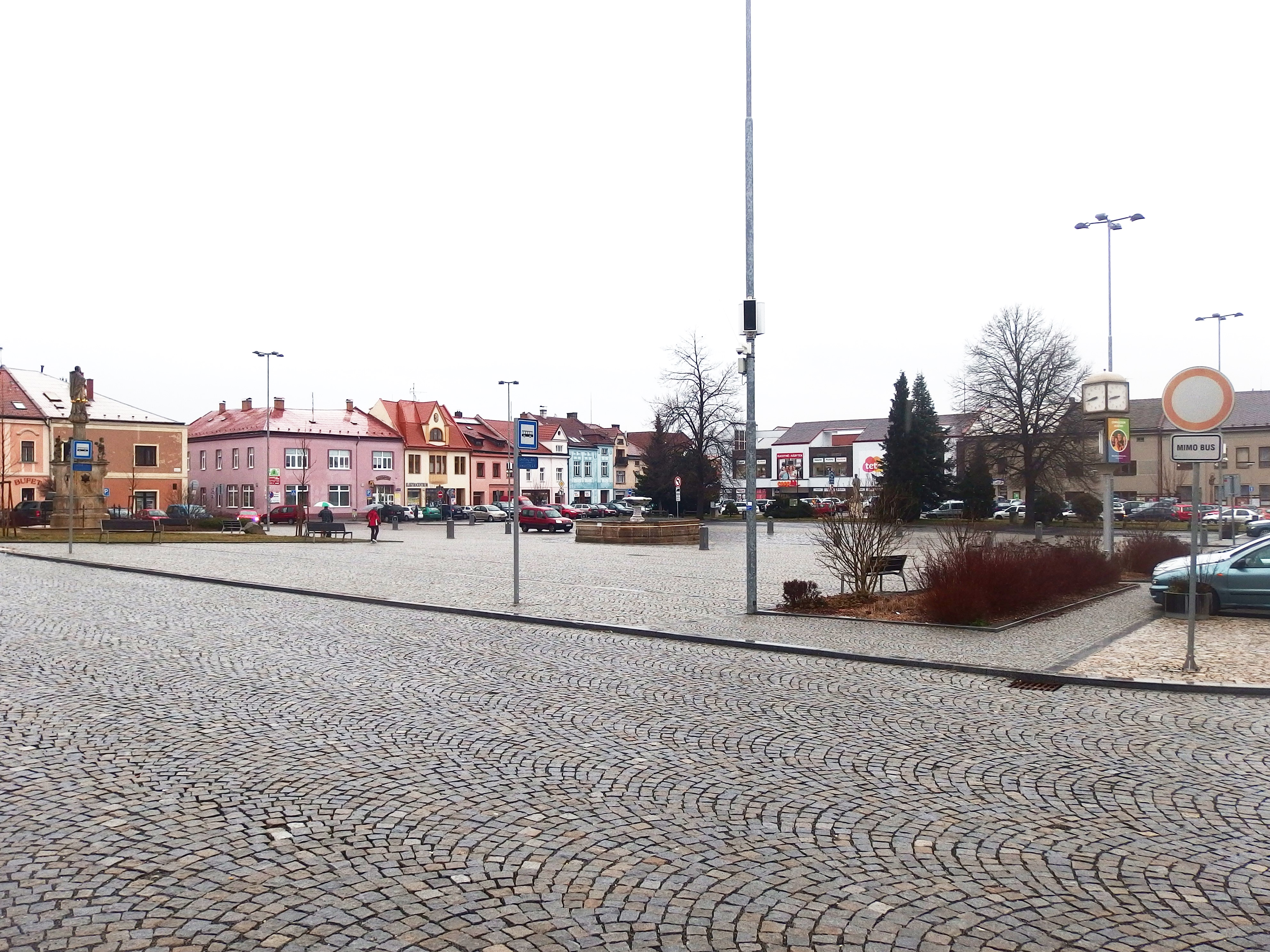
Palackého náměstí

There are no railways or major roads passing through the town.

== Sights ==
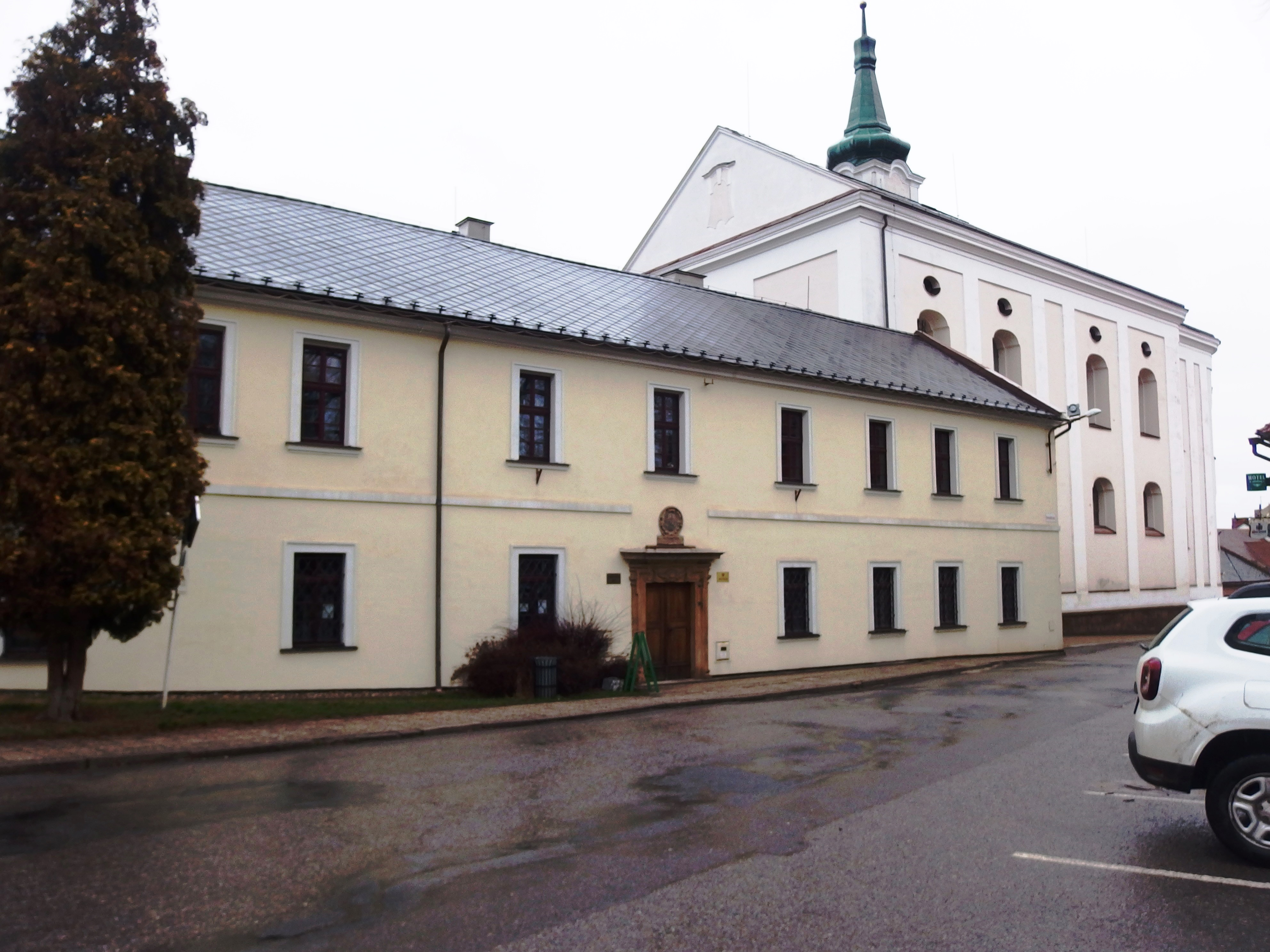
Town museum in the former monastery

Jevíčko centre has preserved the medieval layout of the streets with the square Palackého náměstí in the middle. The centre was delimited by stone town walls built in the 14th century, whose fragments are still visible. The originally Gothic town tower has been also preserved and nowadays serves as an observation tower. It was raised to a height of 50 metres (160 ft) in 1593.

The former Augustinian monastery was founded in the 14th century and abolished in 1784. Today a part of the premises houses the Town Museum. The adjacent Church of the Assumption of the Virgin Mary was built in 1762–1766. It has valuable Baroque interiors. The second church in the town is the Church of Saint Bartholomew, a small Neo-Gothic cemetery church from 1936.

The former synagogue was built in 1794 and replaced a wooden synagogue destroyed by fire in 1747. Today the building serves cultural and religious purposes.

The Renaissance castle was built in 1559 and rebuilt in 18th century to its current form. Nowadays it houses a library and a school.

== Notable people ==
- Cyril Napp (1792–1867), Augustinian abbot
- Richard Fall (1882–1945), Austrian composer and conductor
- Julius Mackerle (1909–1988), inventor and automobile engineer
- František Lízna (1941–2021), Jesuit priest

== Twin towns – sister cities ==
Jevíčko is twinned with:

- (Georgia (country)) Abasha, Georgia
- (Georgia (country)) Martvili, Georgia
