= František Kardaus =

Czechoslovak industrial designer and graphic artist

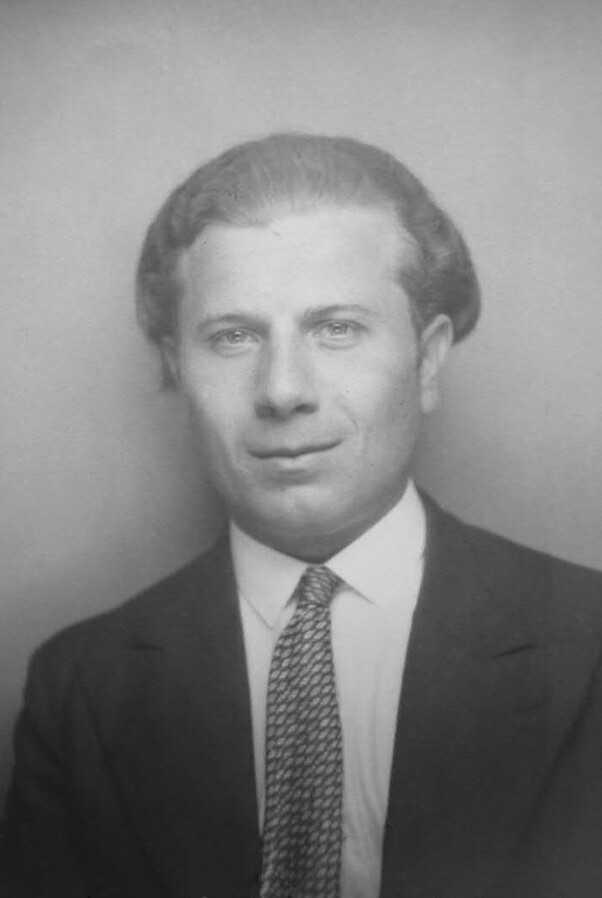
František Kardaus Portrait

František Kardaus (March 25, 1908 in Hořesedly, Bohemia – February 20, 1986 in Velká Chuchle near Prague) was a Czechoslovak industrial designer and graphic artist.

== Life ==
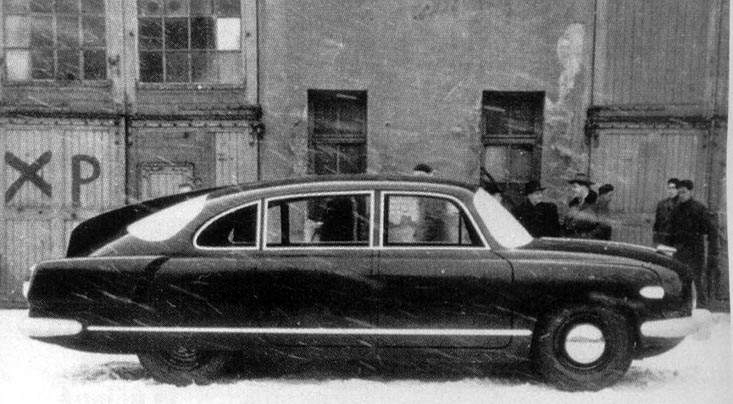
Tatra 603 mock-up, 1955

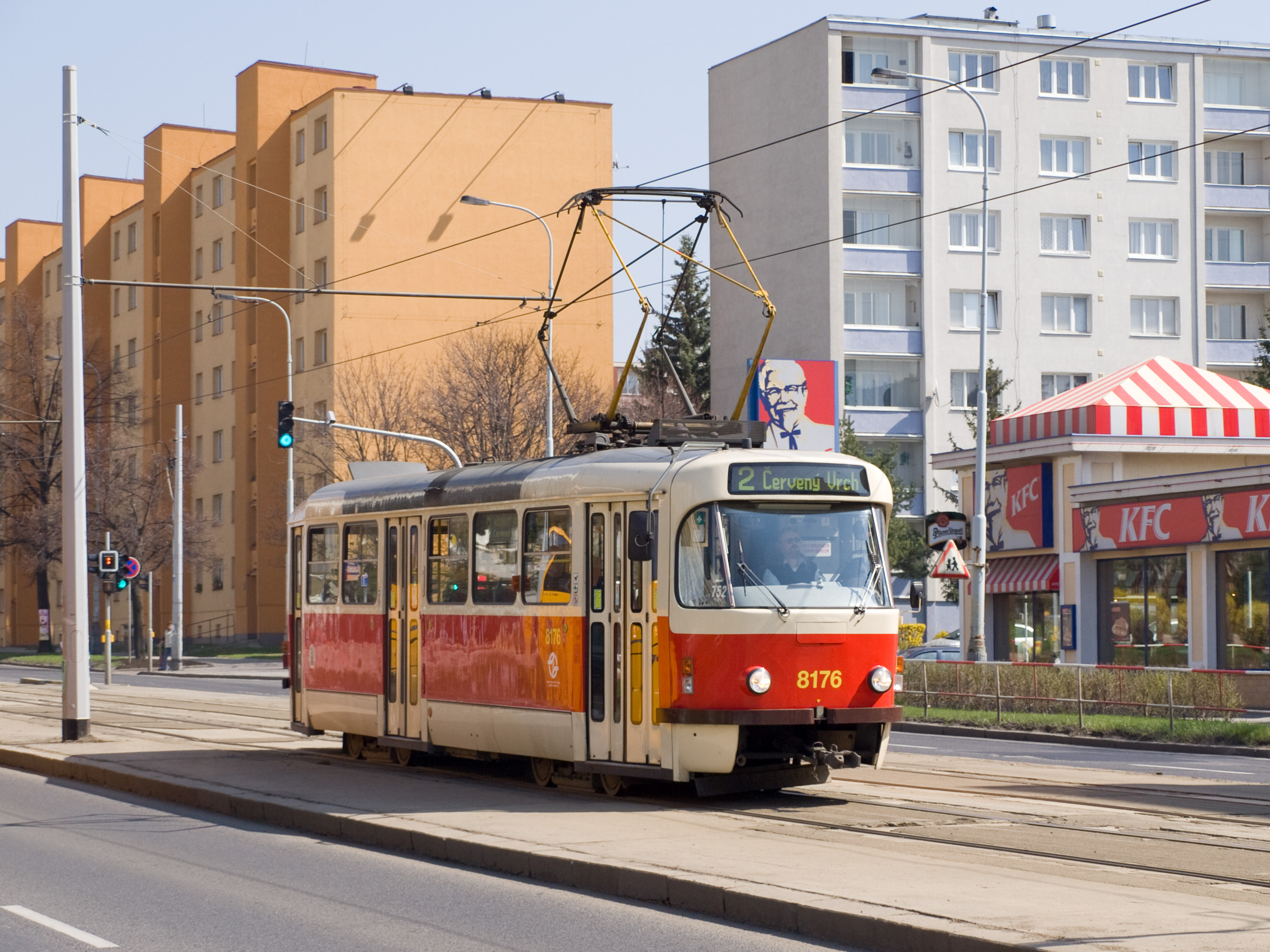
Iconic Tatra T3

Kardaus attended schools in Kolešovice, Bohemia. Later he studied in the atelier of Alois Mudruňka, Professor at Uměleckoprůmyslová škola in Prague. In 1927 he worked for Eduard Böhm & Co., in Berlin. Between 1928 and 1930 he studied graphic art and industrial design at Academie de la Grande Chaumiére in Paris. Till 1934 he worked there at Leon Boue, architect. In 1934 he returned to Prague and worked as an independent designer gaining a number of prizes for his poster designs. Kardaus collaborated with Czech automobile manufacturers Tatra, Škoda, Josef Walter a spol. and Československá zbrojovka. After the war in 1947, he was a graphic artist for B a R (Josef Burjanek a Remo - Reklama a móda), and worked again for the nationalized Tatra, Tesla and other state enterprises. He collaborated on the design of Tatra 87 Diplomat, Tatra 600 and Tatra 603 cars, Tatra trolleybuses T400, and T401 and Tatra trams T1, T2, T3, KT4 and T5. Kardaus designed a number of film posters and produced graphic designs for Motokov, Strojexport, Mototechna, Staropramen companies.

== See also ==
- Tatra
