= František Lízna =

Czech Catholic priest (1941–2021)

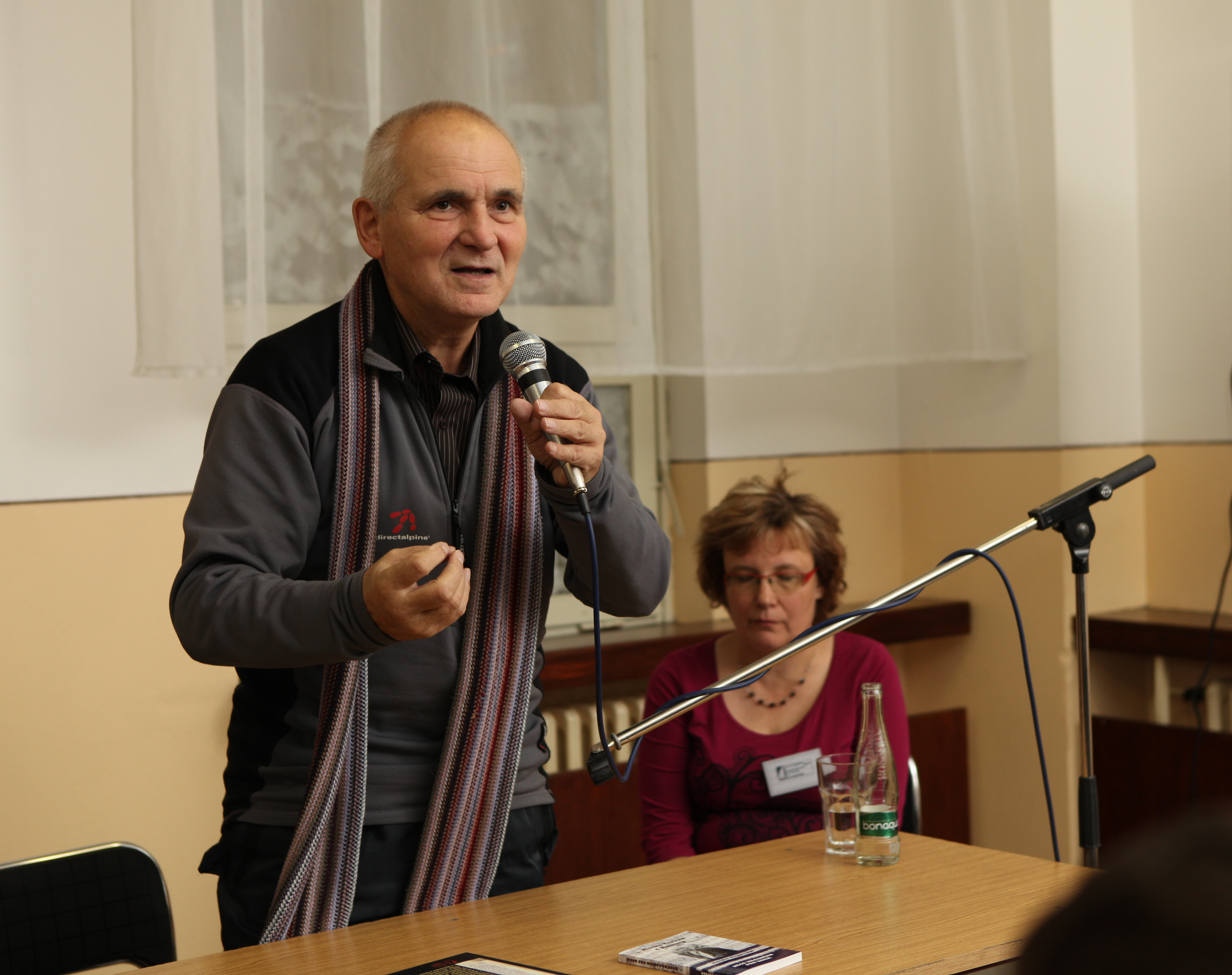
František Lízna, 2009

František Lízna (11 July 1941 – 4 March 2021) was a Czech Jesuit priest.

== Biography ==
He was born in a Moravian town Jevíčko to Ukrainian mother and Czech father. He was a recipient of the Order of Tomáš Garrigue Masaryk.

He died on 4 March 2021 due to COVID-19 during the pandemic in the Czech Republic in Olomouc hospital.
