= Zdeněk Kovář =

Czech industrial designer (1917–2004)

Zdeněk Kovář (26 January 1917, in Vsetín – 21 June 2004, in Zlín) was a renowned Czech industrial designer.

== Life ==
Kovář trained as a shoemaker in Baťa's factory in Zlín, then as locksmith and later as engineer. He studied under prominent Czech sculptor Vincenc Makovský at Zlín's Art School from 1939 where he became interested in industrial design. He graduated there in 1943. He continued to work at Zlín for Baťa creating body designs for vertical drilling machines. In 1947 he founded an industrial design studio in the Zlín Technical College. From 1959 he taught at the Institute of Arts & Crafts in Prague. Kovář was also a sculptor. His industrial designs involved projects for scissor and tool handles, lever door handles, sewing machines, lathes, typewriters, film projectors, record players. His most well-known proposals are for the Tatra truck bodies for types T137 and T138 (1956–1958) and studies for the passenger car Tatra T603 (1954). His design for scissors handles in 1952 anticipated similar product designed products produced in the West, such as Olaf Backstrom's excellent scissors (1960), produced by Fiskars in 1967.
