= Julius Mackerle =

Czech automotobile engineer (1909–1988)

Julius Mackerle (18 June 1909 – 11 September 1988) was a Czech inventor and automobile engineer.

== Life ==
Julius Mackerle was born in Jevíčko, Austria-Hungary in 1909. His father, Julius, owned a brick works firm in Jevíčko and his brother Jaroslav Mackerle (1913–1964) was an architect, designer and amateur archeologist. Julius Mackerle was an inventor, automobile engineer and head designer of Tatra Kopřivnice, a specialist on air-cooled engines. He studied at the Technical University in Brno where he constructed his first motorcar–a two-seater sport roadster with 1000cc J. A. Prestwich Industries motorcycle engine. He finished his studies in 1935.

Initially he worked at Škoda Plzeň as a head of motor engine department and then he transferred to the Prague branch of Škoda. In 1948, he started to work for Tatra in Kopřivnice, where he designed engines for Tatra trucks T 128 and 138. In 1949, under his leadership an engine for a racing Tatraplan T607 and T607-2 with ejector cooling system was developed. In the early 1950s, Mackerle designed the concept for the Tatra T603 V8 engine.

In 1958, Mackerle worked as a director of engine design at Ústav pro výzkum motorových vozidel (Institute for Research and Development of Automobiles) where he designed an experimental car Rotoped. He lectured at Technical Universities in Prague, Brno and Bratislava. In 1962 in London he received the Herbert Akroyd Stuart Prize given by the Institute of Mechanical Engineers.

Between 1964 and 1970, Mackerle invented Rotoped Walking Wheel.

Mackerle was an author of a number of books and articles.

== Bibliography ==
- Julius Mackerle: Americký automobil, Prague 1947 (co-author: V. Grečenko)
- Julius Mackerle: Automobily a letadla: Rozvod motoru, Prague 1951
- Julius Mackerle: Automobilové vzduchem chlazené motory, Prague 1961
- Julius Mackerle: Air-Cooled Motor Engines, Cleaver-Hume Press, London 1961
- Julius Mackerle: Air-Cooled Automobile Engines, The Institute of Mechanical Engineers, London 1961-2
- Julius Mackerle: Automobily s motorem vzadu, Prague 1966
- Julius Mackerle: Automobil dneška a zítřka, Prague 1977
- Julius Mackerle: Motory závodních automobilů, Prague 1980
- Julius Mackerle: Automobil s lepší účinností, Prague 1985
- Julius Mackerle: Malý universální kovoobráběcí stroj, Bratislava 1988

== See also ==
- Hans Ledwinka
- Tatra (company)
