= Tatra 600 =

Tatra 600 Tatraplan
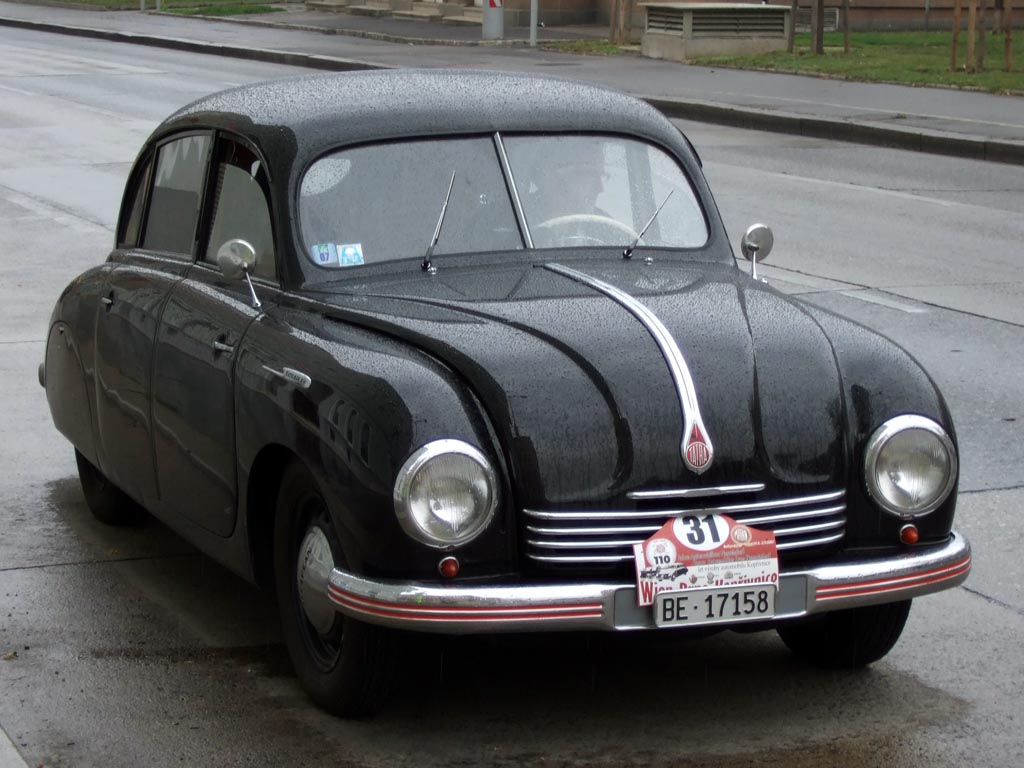

Overview
- Manufacturer: Tatra, a. s.
- Production: 1948–1952; 6,342 built
- Assembly: Kopřivnice, Czechoslovakia (1948–1951); Mladá Boleslav, Czechoslovakia (Škoda plant; 1951–1952)
- Designer: Josef Chalupa; Vladimír Popelář; František Kardaus; Hans Ledwinka

Body and chassis
- Class: Large family car (D)
- Body style: 4-door fastback saloon
- Layout: RR layout

Powertrain
- Engine: 1952 cc (2.0L) Tatra 600 Flat-4
- Transmission: 4-speed manual

Dimensions
- Wheelbase: 2,700 mm (106.3 in)
- Length: 4,540 mm (178.7 in)

Chronology
- Predecessor: Tatra 97
- Successor: Tatra 603

The Tatra 600, named the Tatraplan, was a rear-engined large family car (D-segment in Europe) produced from 1948 to 1952 by the Czech manufacturer Tatra. The prototype was finished in 1946.

== History ==
After World War II, Tatra continued its pre-war business of building passenger cars in addition to commercial vehicles and military vehicles. The factory was nationalised in 1946, two years before the Communist takeover. Although production of pre-war models continued, a new model, the Tatra 600 Tatraplan, was designed in 1946–47 by Josef Chalupa, Vladimír Popelář, František Kardaus, and Hans Ledwinka. The name of the car celebrated the new Communist planned economy but also referred to aeroplane inspiration ('éroplan' means aeroplane in colloquial Czech).

Originally, the 600 was known as the Tatra 107, continuing from Tatra's previous aerodynamic cars- the 77, 87, and 97- as it was intended as a newer, smaller, and cheaper version to replace the outdated Tatra 57. Tatra switched to a new numbering system after WWII, with all car model codes beginning with 600; as a result, the Tatra 107 became the Tatra 600.

After two prototypes, "Ambrož" (December 1946) and "Josef" (March 1947), the 600 went into mass production in 1948. In 1951, the state planning department decided that the Tatraplan should henceforth be built at the Skoda Auto plant in Mladá Boleslav, leaving Tatra to concentrate on truck assembly. This was quite unpopular with the workforce at both plants: as a result, Skoda built Tatraplans for one year only before the model was discontinued in 1952.

The Tatraplan had a monocoque streamlined ponton-styled 6-seat fastback saloon body with front suicide doors and a drag coefficient (Cd) of just 0.32. It was powered by an air-cooled flat-four cylinder, 1,952 cc rear-mounted engine. 6,342 were made, 2,100 of them in Mladá Boleslav. In 2010, in the UK, the Tatraplan won the 'Classic Car of the Year' competition in the 1940s category.

A modified 600 convertible with a Sodomka-built body was presented to Josef Stalin by Antonin Zapototsky on 22 December 1949. As of 2019 it was on display in the Technicke Muzeum Tatra in Koprivnice.

== Models ==
- Tatra 107 - original designation of 600.
- Tatra 201 - commercial version of 600, four built (a pickup truck, a panel van, and two ambulances) in 1947. Unlike the 600, the 201 was front-engined.
- Tatra 600 Diesel - similar to 600 but with 2.0L diesel engine, three prototypes built in 1949.
- Tatra 601 Monte Carlo - a 2-door sports car based on the 600, one (possibly two) built in 1949.
- Tatra 602 Tatraplan Sports - a racing car based on the 600, 2 built in 1949.

== Gallery ==
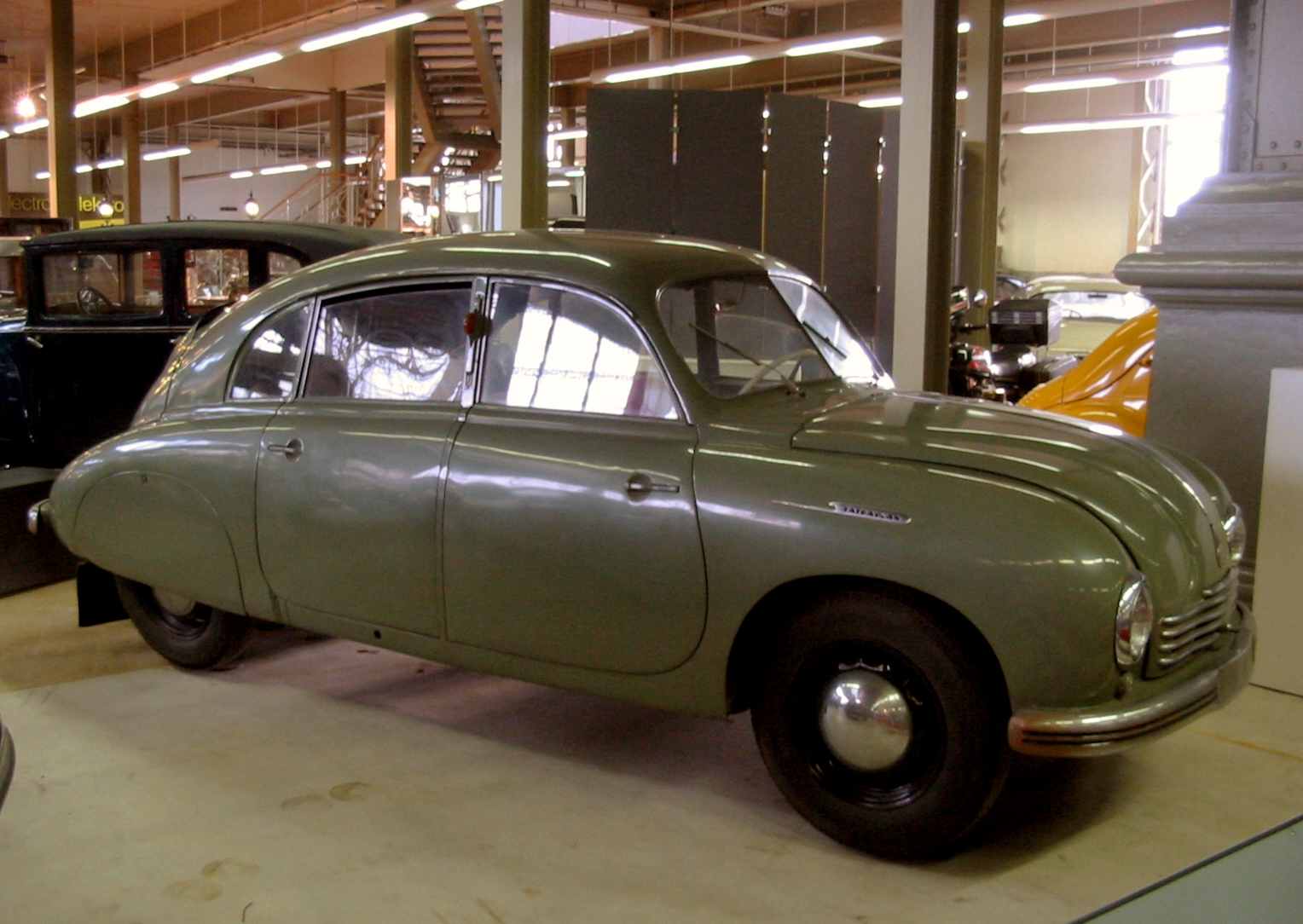
Tatra 600 Tatraplan in an exhibition

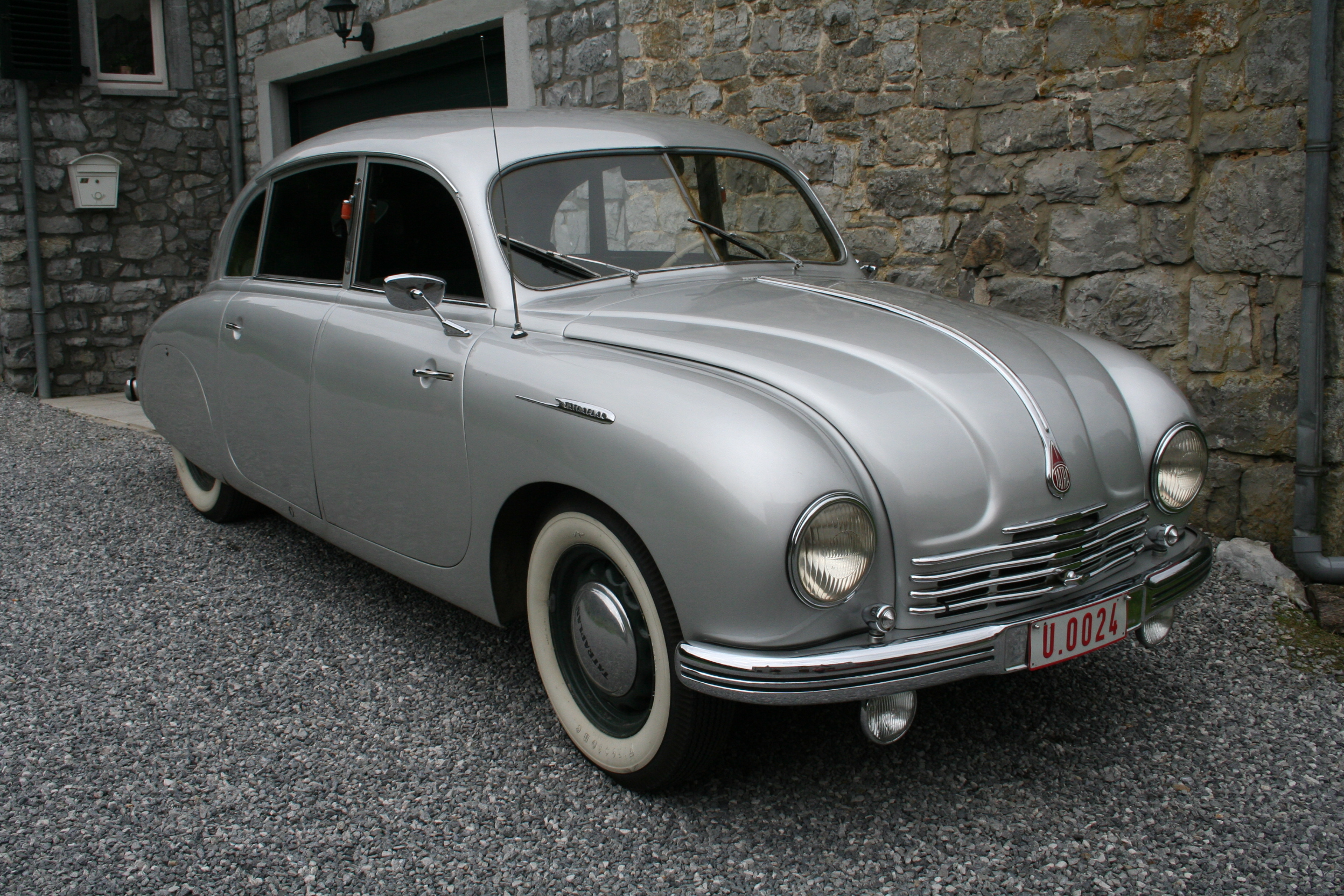
Tatra 600

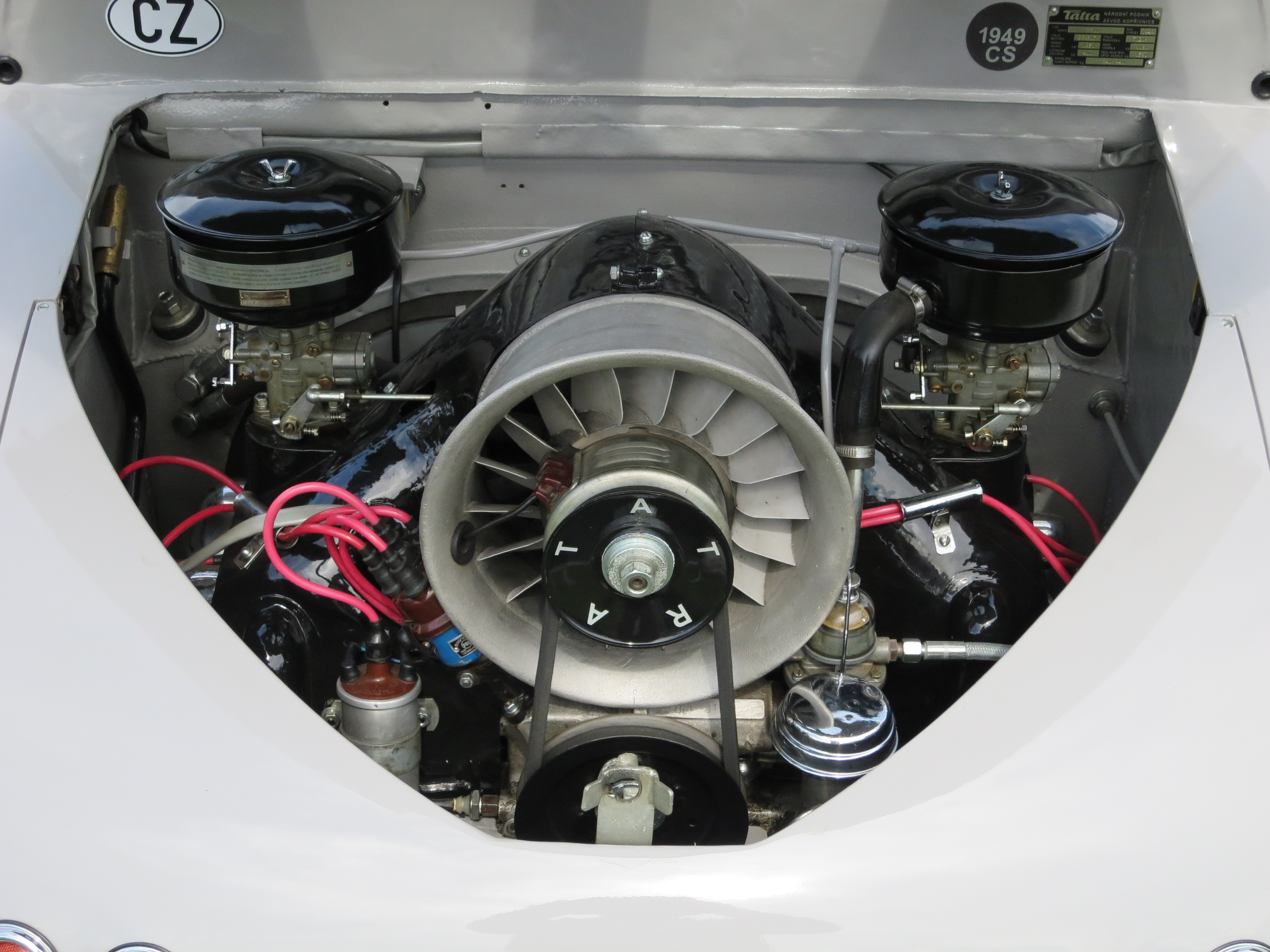
Tatra 600 engine-bay

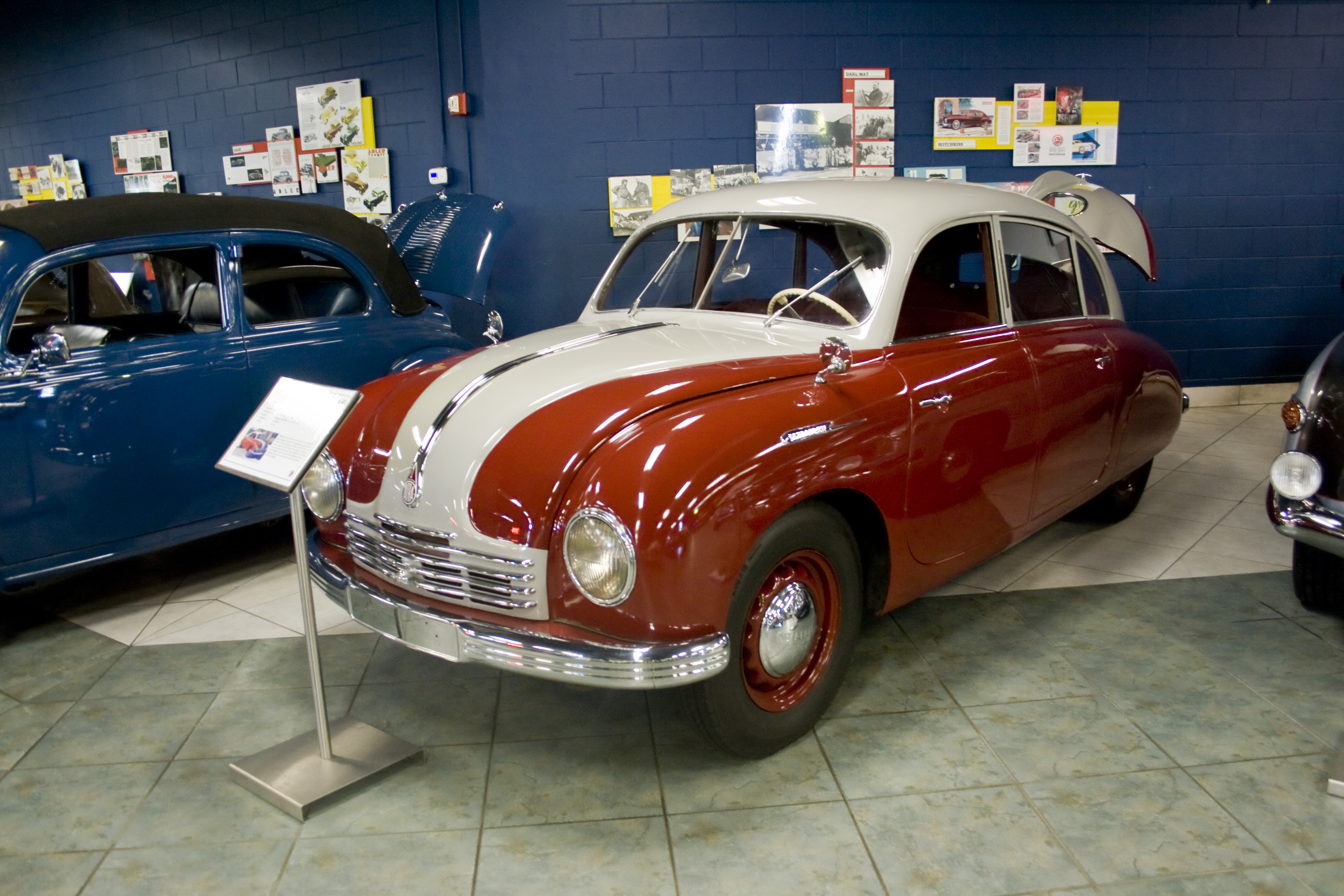
Tatra 600 at the Tampa Bay Automobile Museum

== Notes ==
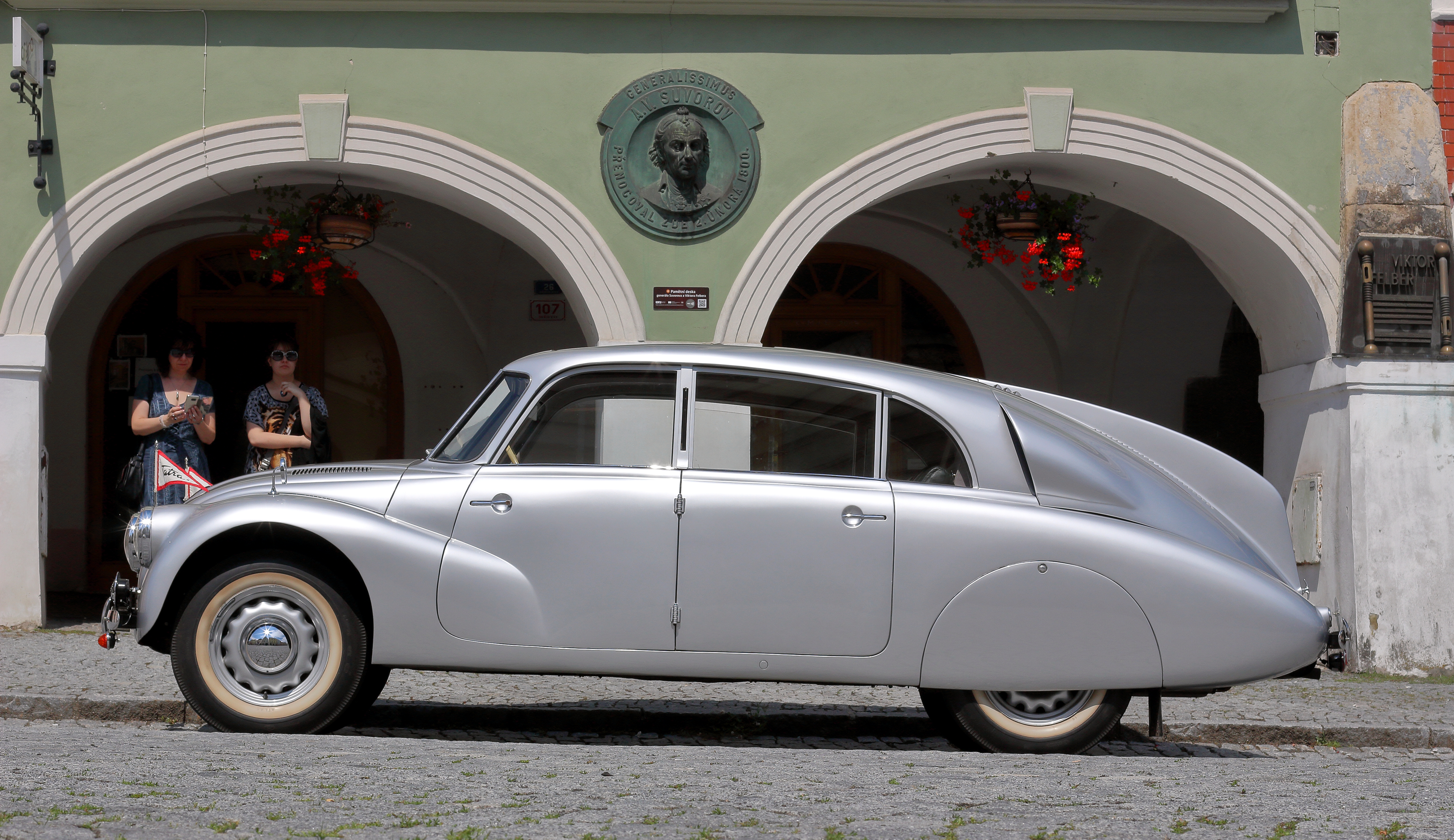

Streamlined Tatras
- Tatra V570 1931, 1933
- Tatra 77 1933-1938
- Tatra 87 1936-1950
- Tatra 97 1936-1939
- Tatra 600 1946-1952
- Tatra 603 1956-1975
