= Tatra 603 =

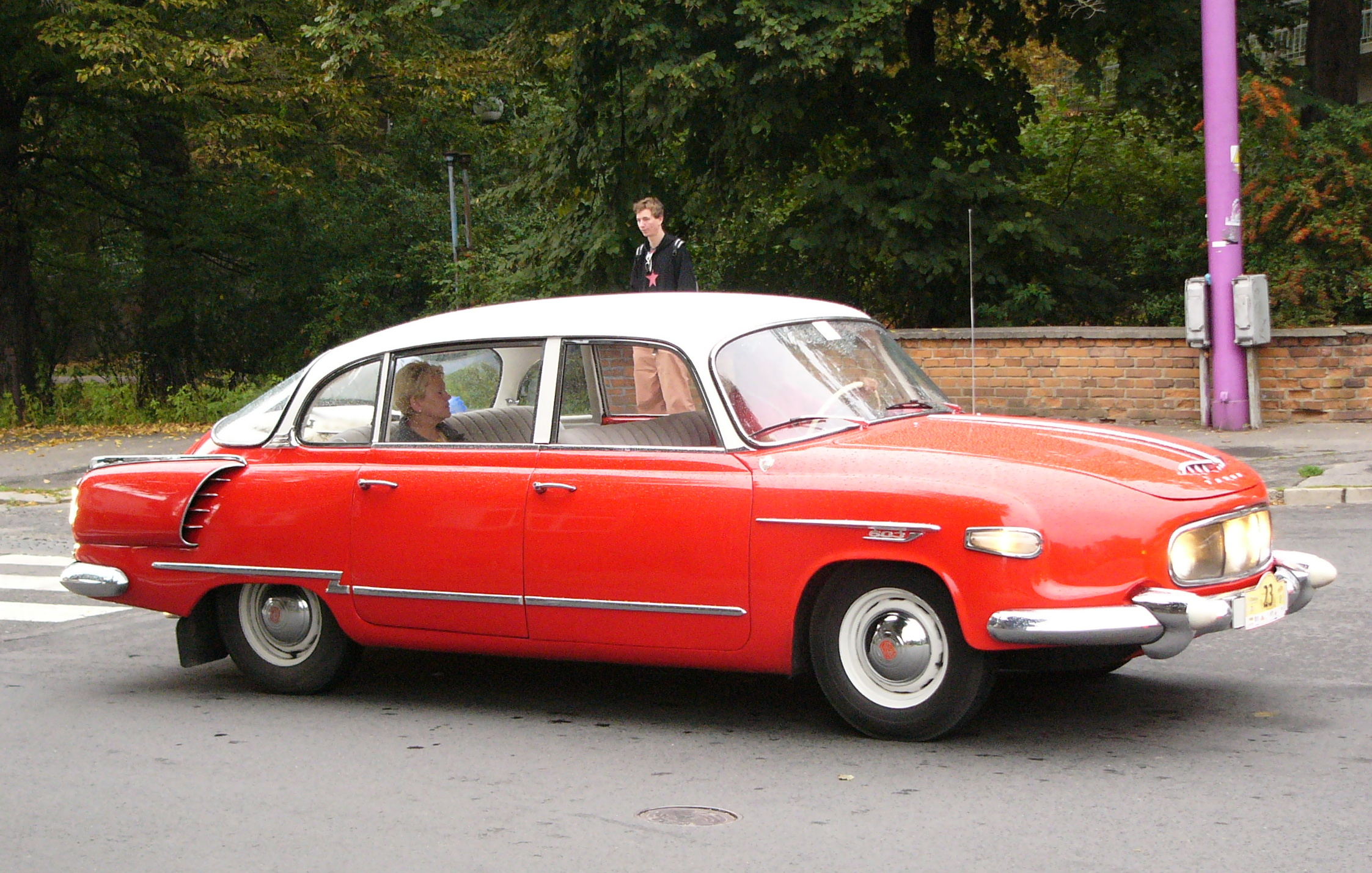
- Tatra T603 (original version; 1956–1962)

Overview
- Manufacturer: Tatra
- Production: 1956–1962 (Tatra 603); 1962–1975 (Tatra 2-603)
- Assembly: Czechoslovakia: Kopřivnice, Moravia, (1956–1969); Czechoslovakia: Příbor, Moravia (1969–1975)
- Designer: Julius Mackerle; František Kardaus; Vladimír Popelář; Josef Chalupa; Zdeněk Kovář

Body and chassis
- Class: Full-size luxury car
- Body style: 4-door saloon
- Layout: RR layout

Powertrain
- Engine: 2,474 cc Tatra 603G/H air-cooled V8 (1962–1975); 2,545 cc Tatra 603F air-cooled V8 (1956–1962)
- Transmission: 4-speed manual

Dimensions
- Wheelbase: 2,748 mm (108.2 in)
- Length: 5,065 mm (199.4 in)
- Width: 1,910 mm (75.2 in)
- Height: 1,529 mm (60.2 in)
- Curb weight: 1,400 kg (3,086 lb)

Chronology
- Predecessor: Tatra 87; Tatra 600
- Successor: Tatra 613

The Tatra 603 is a large rear-engined luxury car which was produced by the Czechoslovak company Tatra from 1956 to 1975. It was a continuation of the series of Tatra streamlined sedans which began with the Tatra 77. In Socialist Czechoslovakia, only high-ranking party officials and heads of factories were driven in 603s; the car was also exported to a number of other countries.

== History ==
Tatra was the manufacturer of luxurious automobiles in the Czech lands. Austro-Hungarian emperor Charles I used a NW type T; the Czechoslovak president Tomáš Garrigue Masaryk drove the twelve-cylinder Tatra 80 while his successor Edvard Beneš drove the streamlined Tatra 87. While the T87 was manufactured from 1936 to 1950, the post-war T600 may be considered the first car of the new political order. The T600 was much smaller and used an engine of only four cylinders, making it the descendant of the T97, the small pre-war Tatra. Production of the T97 had been stopped by the Nazis in order to cover its resemblance to their KdF-Wagen (which later became known as the VW Beetle). Czechoslovakia had a Socialist government from 1948, and its economy was later subject to some regulation by the Council for Mutual Economic Assistance (COMECON), consisting of eastern European socialist nations. After production of the T600 ended in 1952, COMECON decided that Tatra would manufacture only trucks, while luxury cars would be imported into Czechoslovakia from the USSR.

The Tatra designers, however, continued their work on a new car in secret. In 1952 a group of designers led by František Kardaus and Vladimír Popelář began the secret development of a new car called Valuta, while officially devoting their time to development of a new three-axle bus T400. In 1953 the socialist government became frustrated with delays in delivery of Soviet cars as well as with their poor quality and they ordered development of a new luxury Tatra, thus giving legitimacy to the team's previous work. The new car was to have a 3.5-litre air-cooled eight-cylinder engine, and it was to be ready for production by the end of 1954. While the chassis was almost ready due to the work on Valuta, the engine remained an issue. Even in their secret designs nobody had anticipated such a large engine. Engineer Julius Mackerle proposed a "temporary" solution of using the already developed 2.5-litre T603 engine in the new car (it was already successfully used in Tatra racecars and Tatra 87-603), while the larger one was supposed to be ready in the next 4–5 years.

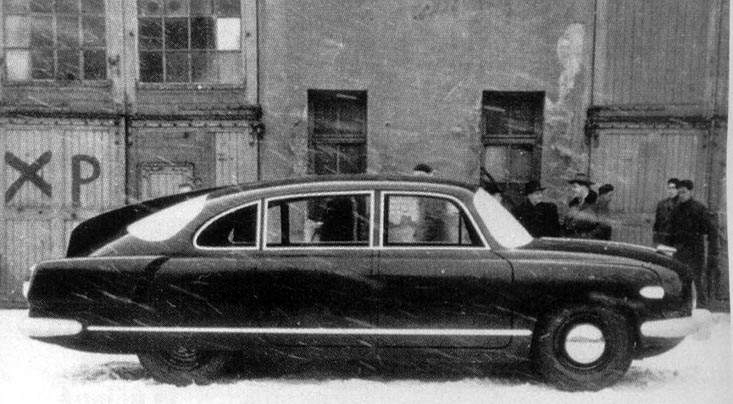
Tatra 603 by Zdeněk Kovář (1955 mock-up)

The first drivable T603 was completed in 1955. A number of body designs were tested in wind-tunnels. In the end the one proposed by František Kardas and fine-tuned by Vladimír Popelář and Josef Chalupa was chosen for production.

Three versions of the model T603 were manufactured successively between 1956 and 1975. These cars are designated T603, T 2-603 and T 3-603, though the 3- was not an official designation used by Tatra.

The T603-1 is easily distinguished by its three headlamps enclosed beneath a clear glass cover. The side ones were fixed, the middle one rotated together with the front axle.

In 1962 the 2-603 was launched. Four headlamps were mounted within a long oval grille and the dashboard was changed. The rear track was increased by 55 mm and the engine was modernized.

In 1966 the car gained power brakes, while in 1967 other changes were added: for example the windshield's height was enlarged by 66 mm.

The unofficial -3 (or Tatra 2-603 II) omits the grille and places the headlamps flush with the car's front fascia. The car got disc brakes on all four wheels and was officially changed to a five-seater for legal reasons (from 1968 the safety belts became obligatory for passengers on front seats).

In 1973 the T603 became the first Czechoslovak car with contactless thyristor ignition.

=== Official use ===
The Model T603 was allocated only to senior members of the political and industrial establishments. About a third of T603 production was exported to most of the central and eastern European countries allied to Czechoslovakia at the time, as well as to Cuba and China. Sales to private individuals were not normally possible, although a few T603s appear to have been privately owned in East Germany. During the car's twenty-year production run, 20,422 cars were built, mostly by hand. To the west of the Iron Curtain the car was mostly unknown, though some were used by Czechoslovak embassies in western capitals, and for a brief period some were exported to Canada and the USA, following on the success of the rear-engined VW Beetle. The model T603 was replaced by the T613 in 1974. In Czechoslovakia the interpretation for 603 was that it was a six passenger car, zero people could afford it and usually three passengers drove in it: The Party Boss or other high official, the driver and the secretary. Former Cuban President Fidel Castro was gifted a white T603 featuring air conditioning by the Czechoslovak company; in return, Castro reportedly sent Tatra a Chevrolet Corvair.

Originally the Comecon issued a provision limiting Czechoslovakia to production of no more than 300 luxurious cars per year. Tatra was making more of them, though. This became an issue in 1957 and 1958, especially considering that East Germany produced its own luxurious car, the Sachsenring P240. The Comecon decided that the two countries must reach a deal to choose which country would continue production to supply the other. In 1958 the Ministries of Interior of both countries took part in trials, which East Germany's Minister of Machinery personally attended. The 603 won, and subsequently East Germany's higher communist officials were able to drive the T603, while the lower ones had to drive imports from USSR.

== Design ==
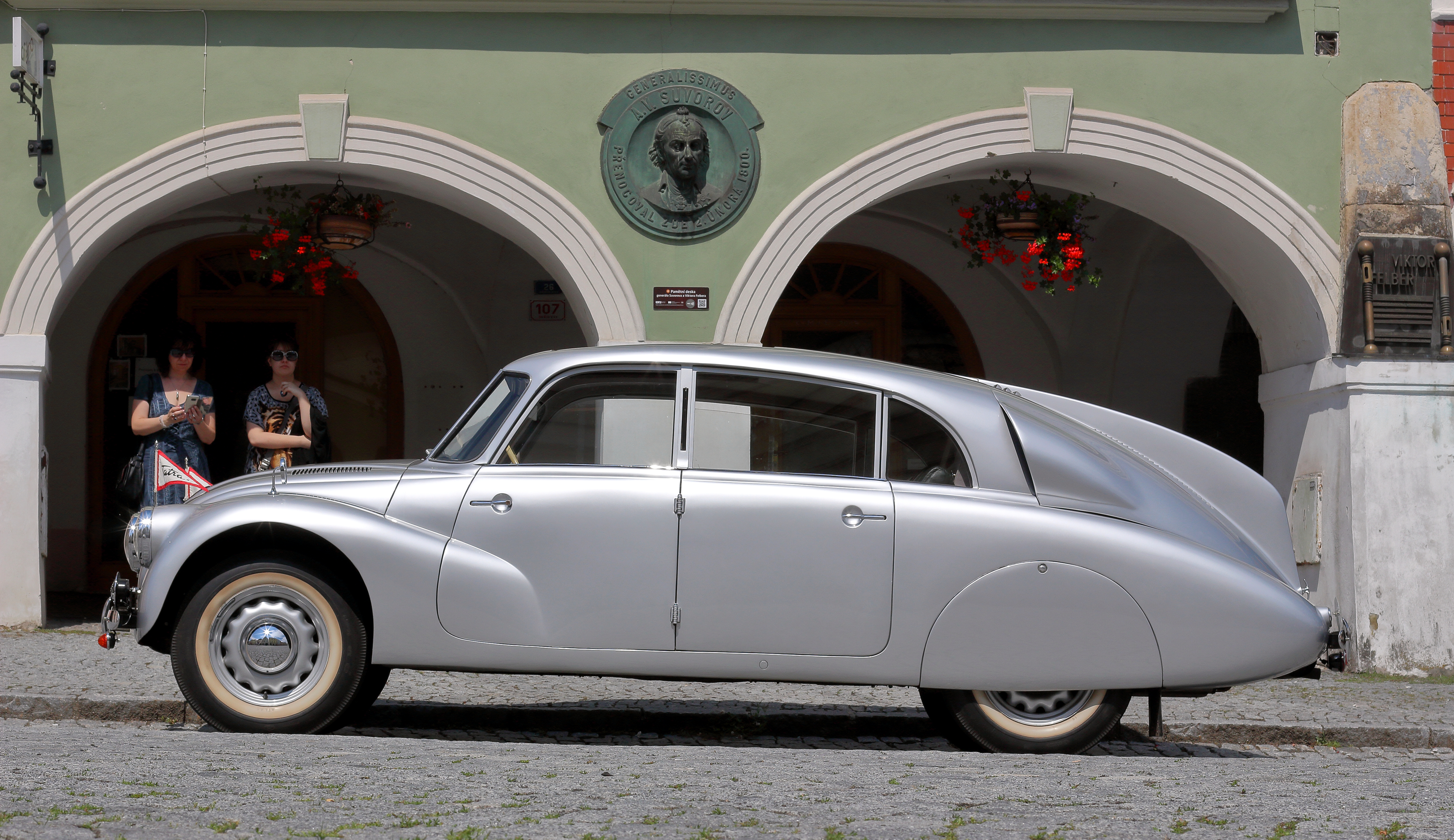

Streamlined Tatras
- Tatra V570 1931, 1933
- Tatra 77 1933–1938
- Tatra 87 1936–1950
- Tatra 97 1936–1939
- Tatra 600 1946–1952
- Tatra 603 1956–1975

The first model of 603 was characterized by three headlamps. Originally the three headlights were under a single piece of glass, but later three-piece glass was used. There was a large luggage compartment under the front bonnet, under which was the spare wheel. The spare wheel was in a separate drop-down bin opened from inside the front boot, thus making it possible to reach it without taking out luggage. At least one prototype had a two-piece windscreen but production cars had single-sheet screens of two different heights and three curvatures during the long production run. The interior featured enough space to seat six occupants. To gain enough space for the middle occupant in the front seats the shift lever was on the steering column, rather than on the floor. The front seats could be folded down to make a large bed. Behind the rear seats there was a deep storage area, initially covered. The rear was characterized by a large two piece window making it the first rear-engined Tatra with good rear visibility.

An independent petrol-burning heater is fitted under the front seat.

Low volume production levels and the resulting lack of production automation meant that "one off" adaptations were relatively easy to accomplish.

=== Engine ===
Tatra 603 F
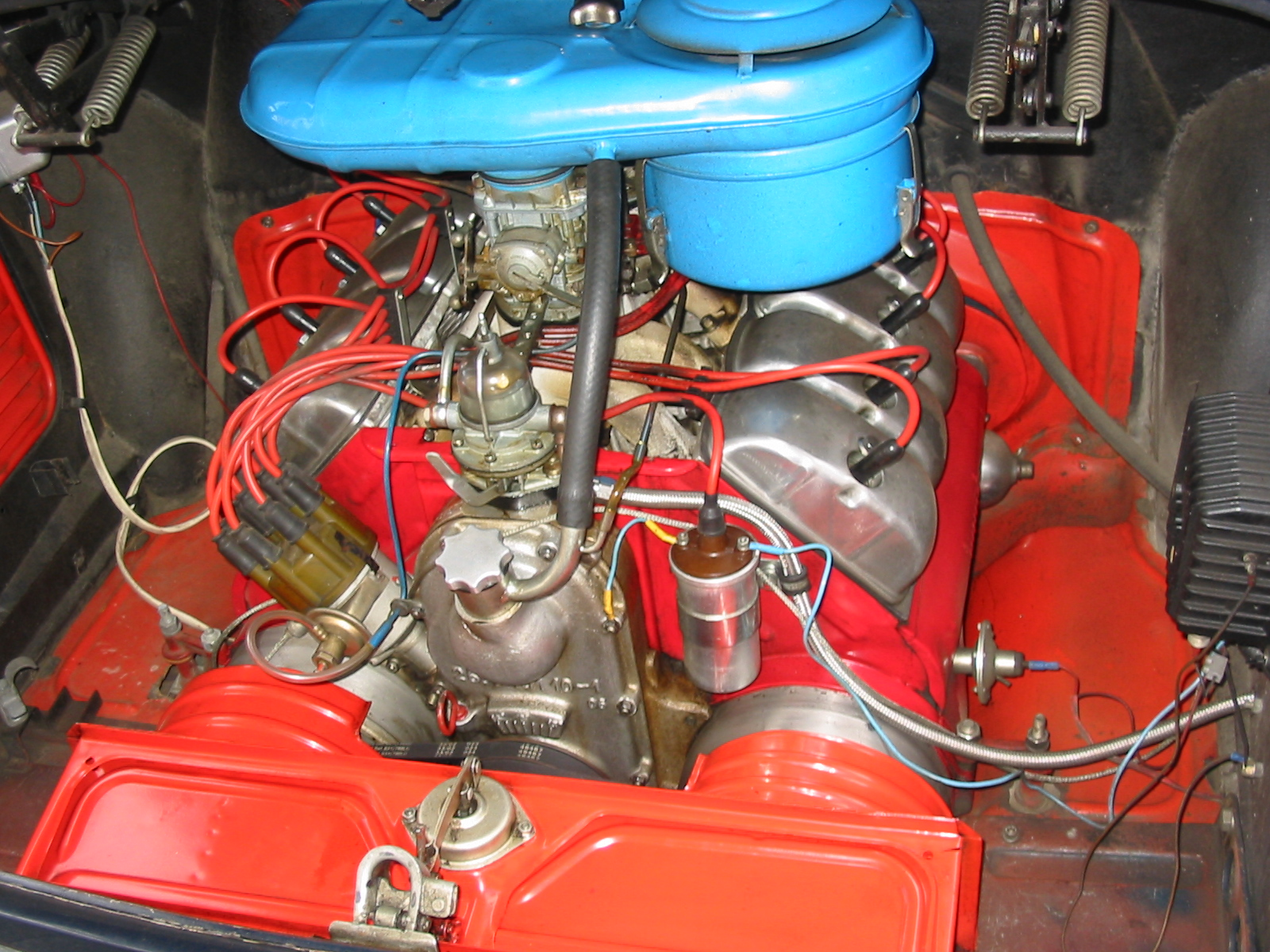

Layout
- Configuration: V8
- Displacement: 2,545 cc
- Cylinder bore: 75 mm (2.95 in)
- Piston stroke: 72 mm (2.83 in)
- Valvetrain: OHV
- Compression ratio: 6.5:1

Combustion
- Cooling system: air-cooled

Output
- Power output: 74 kW (100 hp)
- Torque output: 152 N⋅m (112 lb⋅ft) at 4800 rpm

Dimensions
- Dry weight: 180 kg (397 lb)

Tatra 603 G

Layout
- Configuration: V8
- Displacement: 2,472 cc
- Cylinder bore: 75 mm (2.95 in)
- Piston stroke: 70 mm (2.76 in)
- Valvetrain: OHV
- Compression ratio: 8.2:1

Output
- Power output: 77.5 kW (104 hp)
- Torque output: 166 N⋅m (122 ft⋅lbf) at 4800 rpm

The V8 overhead valve hemi engine weighed only 180 kg (397 lb), allowing the car to have 47/53 front/rear interaxle weight distribution when fully loaded. The engine was already used in the late Tatra 87 and its extreme reliability was confirmed by previous use in the Tatra 607 race car or military light truck T805. The air-cooling system was designed to cool the most heated parts of the engine more effectively.

Further modifications led to introduction of the T603H engine, from which the T603HB (export model) and T603HT (tropical climate model) were derived.

=== Transmission ===
The synchronized gearbox had four speeds (+ reverse). Customers could order "mountain" gearing in place of the standard ratios. The gear stick was placed under the steering wheel in order to make room for the middle occupant of the front seats.

The gearbox made a monoblock with the shaft of the rear axle.

=== Suspension ===
Suspension was by swing axles in the rear and MacPherson suspension in the front. Coil springs were used with hydraulic telescopic shock absorbers.

Initially a double-circuit hydraulic brake system was used, but later a single-circuit was used. All wheels had drum brakes until 1968, when they were replaced by disc brakes.

== T603 in competition ==
The T603s took part in 79 races (24 international) in years 1957 to 1967, resulting in a total 60 first, 56 second and 49 third positions. In most cases production cars with minimum modifications participated in races, but more modified versions also emerged later, notably one with ejector cooled engine.

=== Beginnings ===
In 1959 three cars took part in Austrian Alpine Cup. All of them finished and were decorated; Alois Mark won first position in his class.

One month later the same crews drove the 31st Rallye Wiesbaden (1231 km); Alois Mark was the best foreign driver and got 3rd position overall, behind two Mercedes cars. During the closing beauty and elegance competition T603s were decorated with golden ribbon.

=== Rally Monte Carlo 1960 ===
Tatra aimed to take part in Rally Monte Carlo of 1960, but already from the beginning they faced opposition from the official Czechoslovak institutions. First the sport association wanted to place its own drivers into T603s instead of the company ones, while later it officially banned participation of both Tatras and Škodas. This of course made the people from the Moravian company furious - they saw in the decision typical Bohemian Pragocentrism, especially after the participation of Škoda was allowed. The justification was that Škoda had already been exported to western markets.

=== Liège-Sofia-Liège 1963 ===
Only one 603 took a part in the competition; it was damaged when it crashed after a tire blew out.

=== Spa-Sofia-Liège 1964 ===
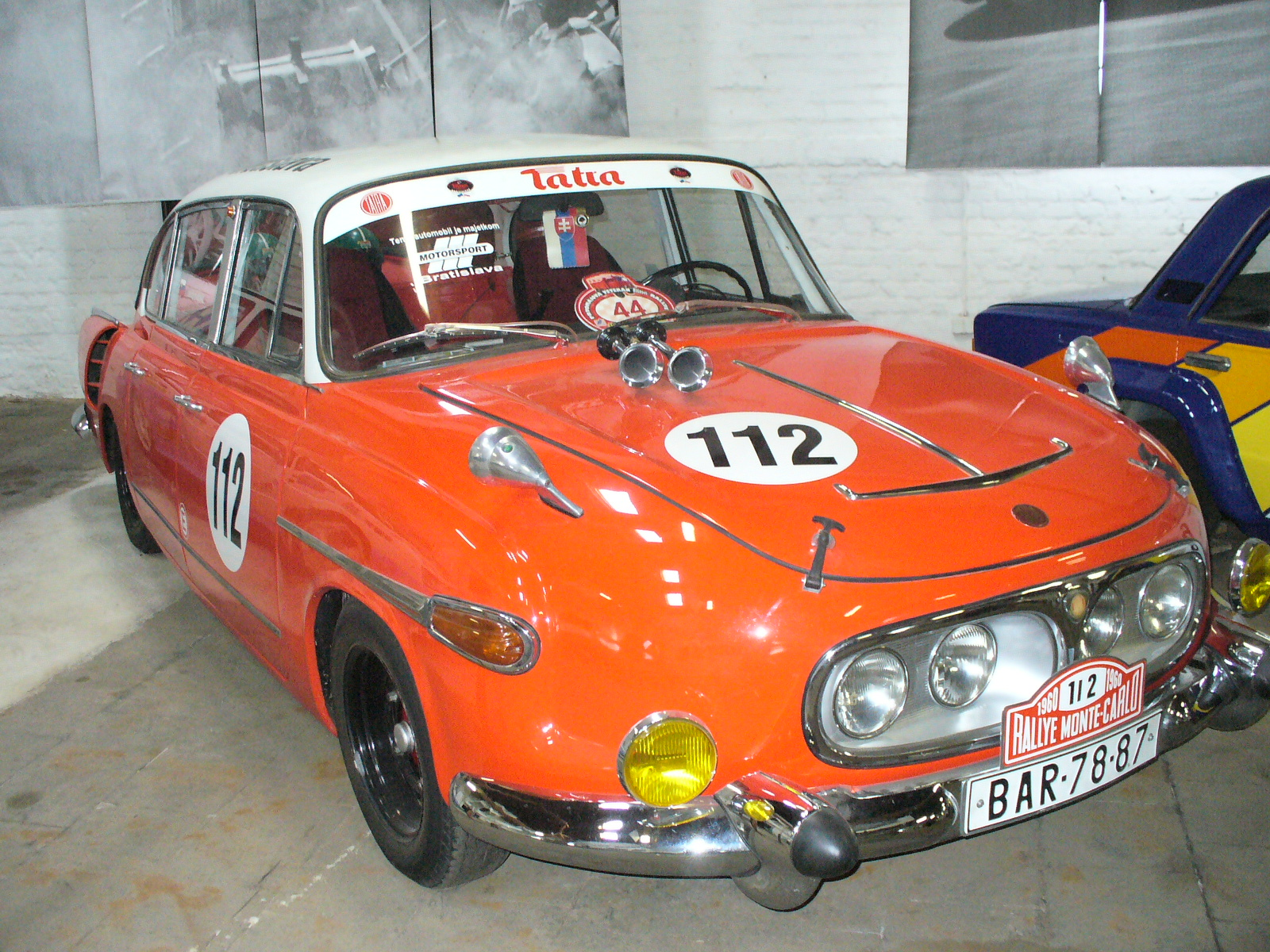

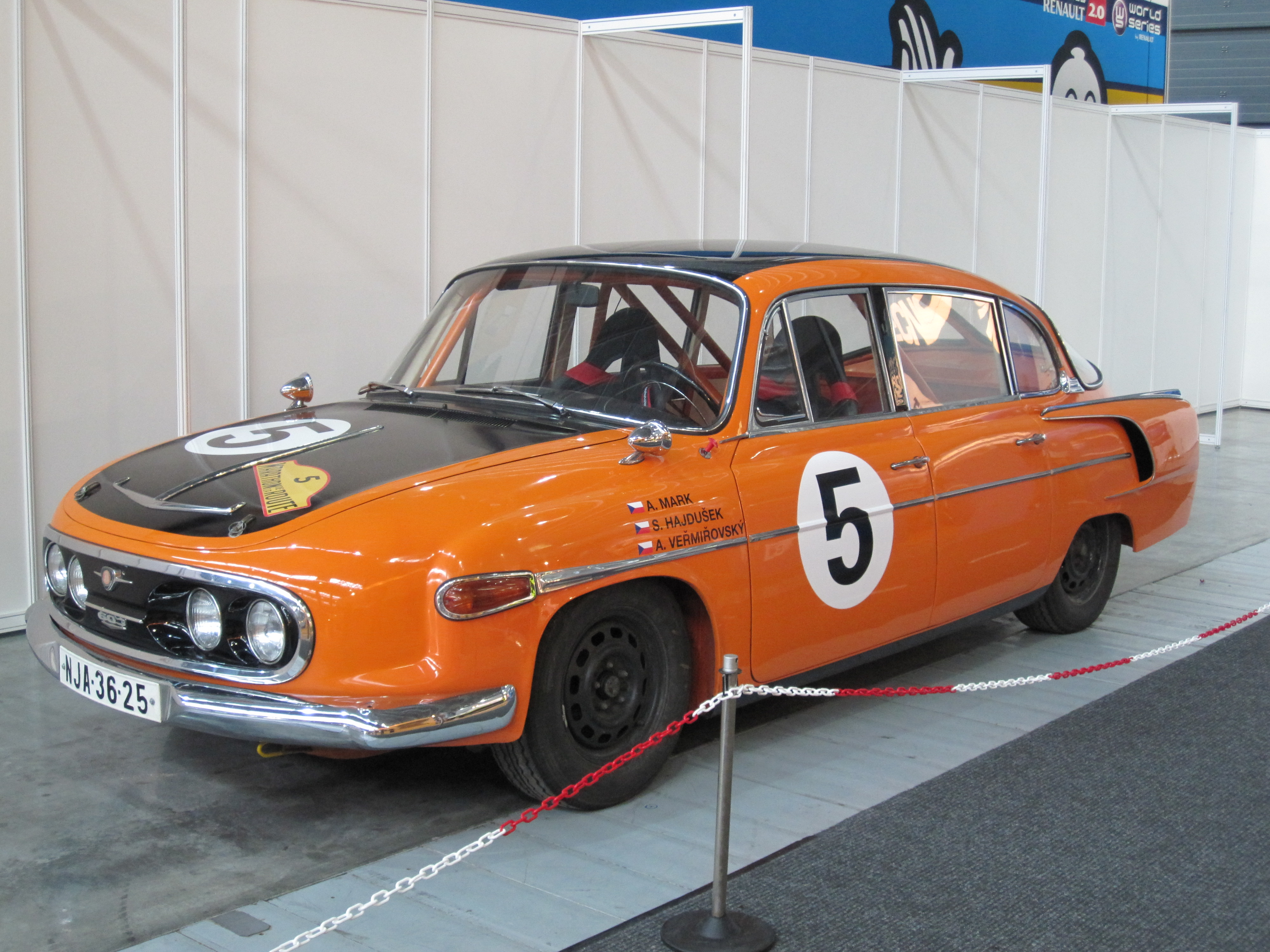

Three 603s entered the 6,100 km long race. One of them finished first in its class (overall fifteenth), one crew gave up and another dropped out with a mechanical failure. Altogether 97 cars took part, but only 21 came to the finish line.

=== Marathon de la Route 1965 ===
Three crews with Tatra 2-603GTs took part in the race. The competition began in Spa, however the main part was at Nürburgring. After 82 hours (most of it in heavy rain) Tatras took second and third position in its class, being third and fourth overall. The third car did not see the end due to malfunction. Tatra team was the only one in the GT category which using serial production tires in the race.

=== Marathon de la Route 1966 ===
Again three crews took part in the competition, however this time they entered the B5 category, allowing them to modify the cars. Tatra gained 1-2-3 victory in its class (3-4-5 overall) and also gained first position for the team as a whole. After one of the cars hit a deer its headlights were damaged, which led to penalization. Later the same crew had problems with fueling and with a tire, which (together with penalization) dropped them to 22nd position. By the end this very crew took 5th overall.

=== Marathon de la Route 1967 ===
Three crews took part in the Marathon de la Route with pre-series examples of the modernized 1968 model. Due to very bad weather during the last two nights only 13 of 43 cars made it to the finish line; two of them were 603s, taking 3rd and 4th position in class (4th and 5th overall). One of the Czech drivers subsequently commented on the race: "I feel lucky to be still alive."

=== Races in Czechoslovakia ===
Tatras took part also in a number of national competitions, usually taking pole positions.

== Gallery ==
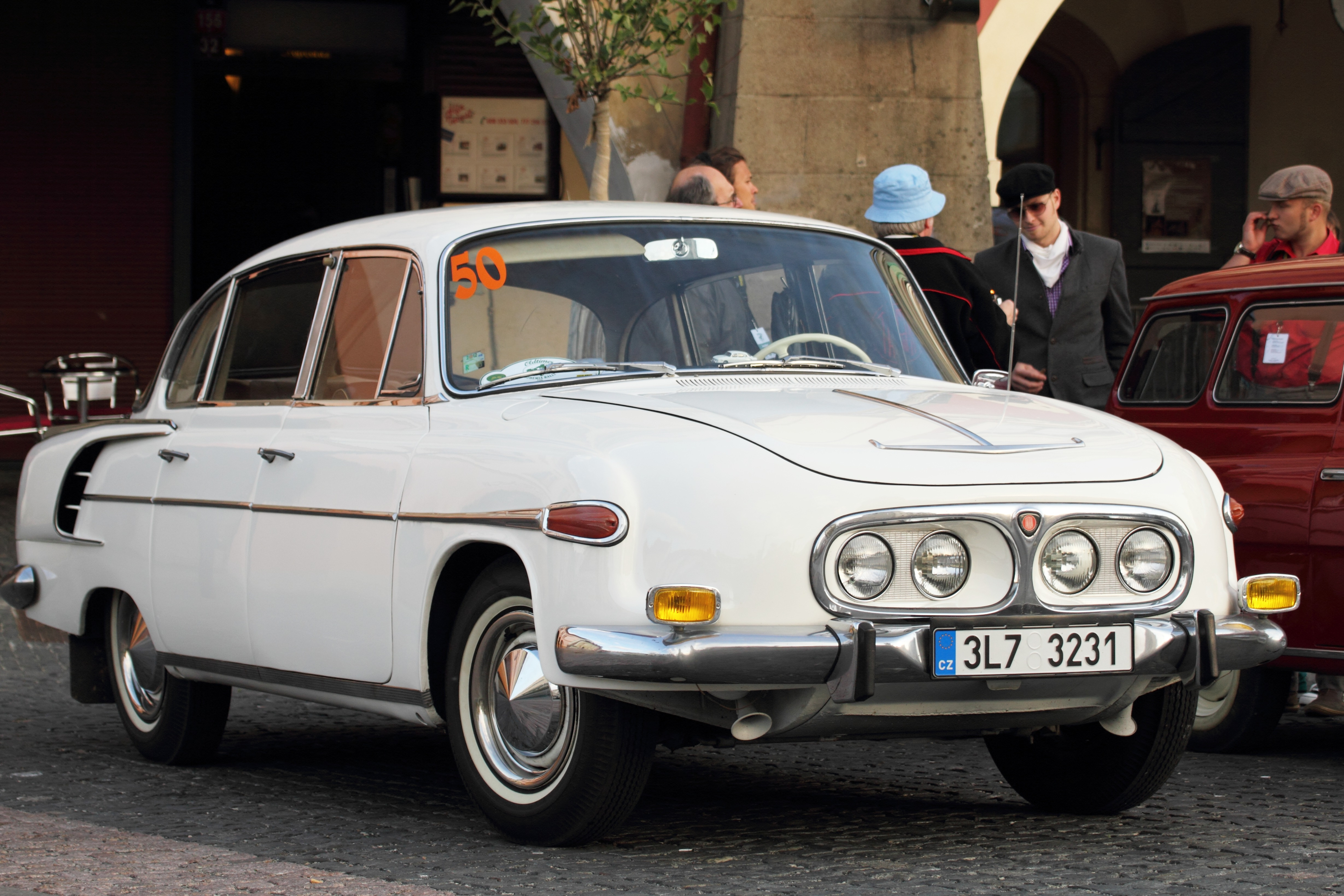
Tatra 2-603

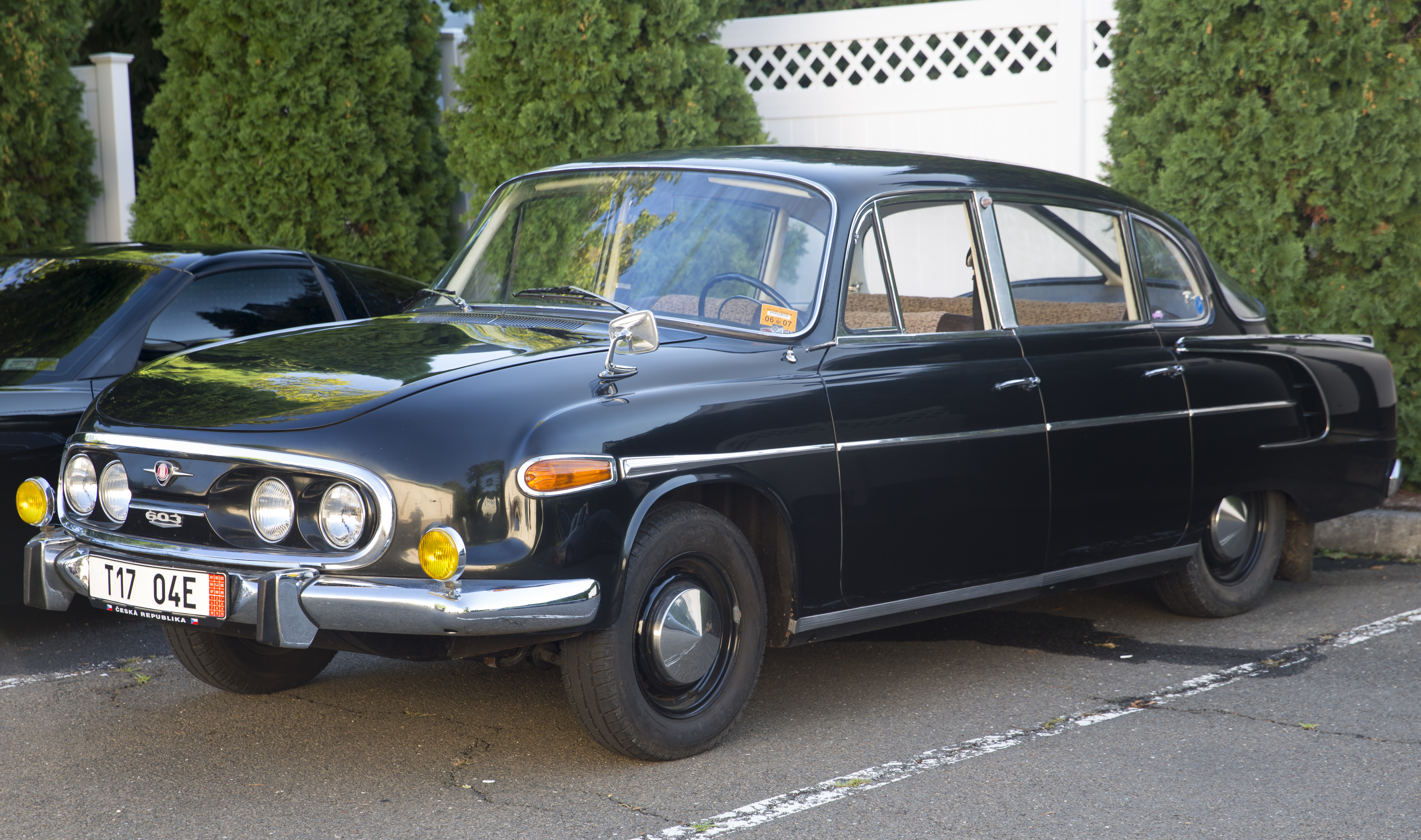
Tatra 2-603 II

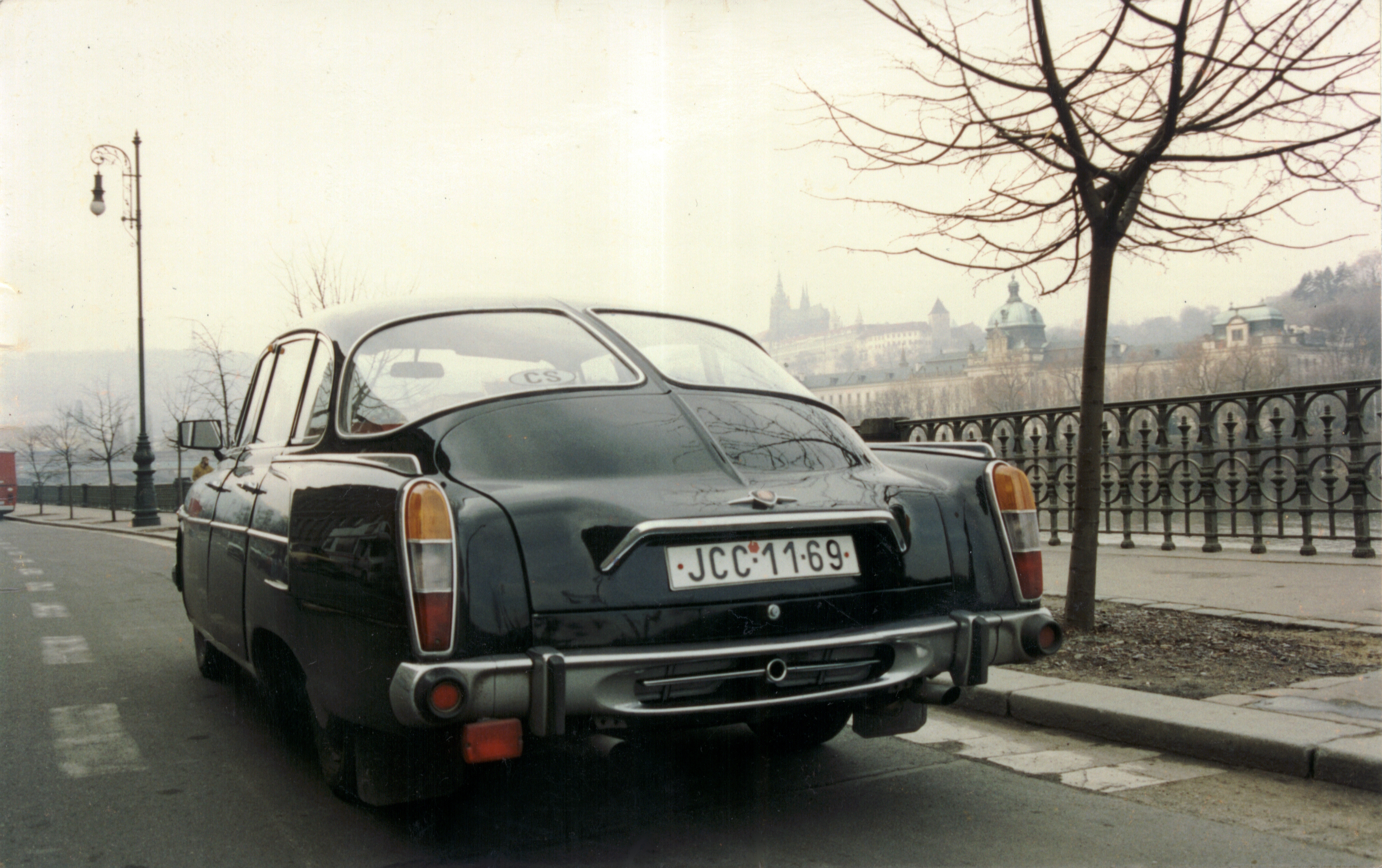
T603 rear view

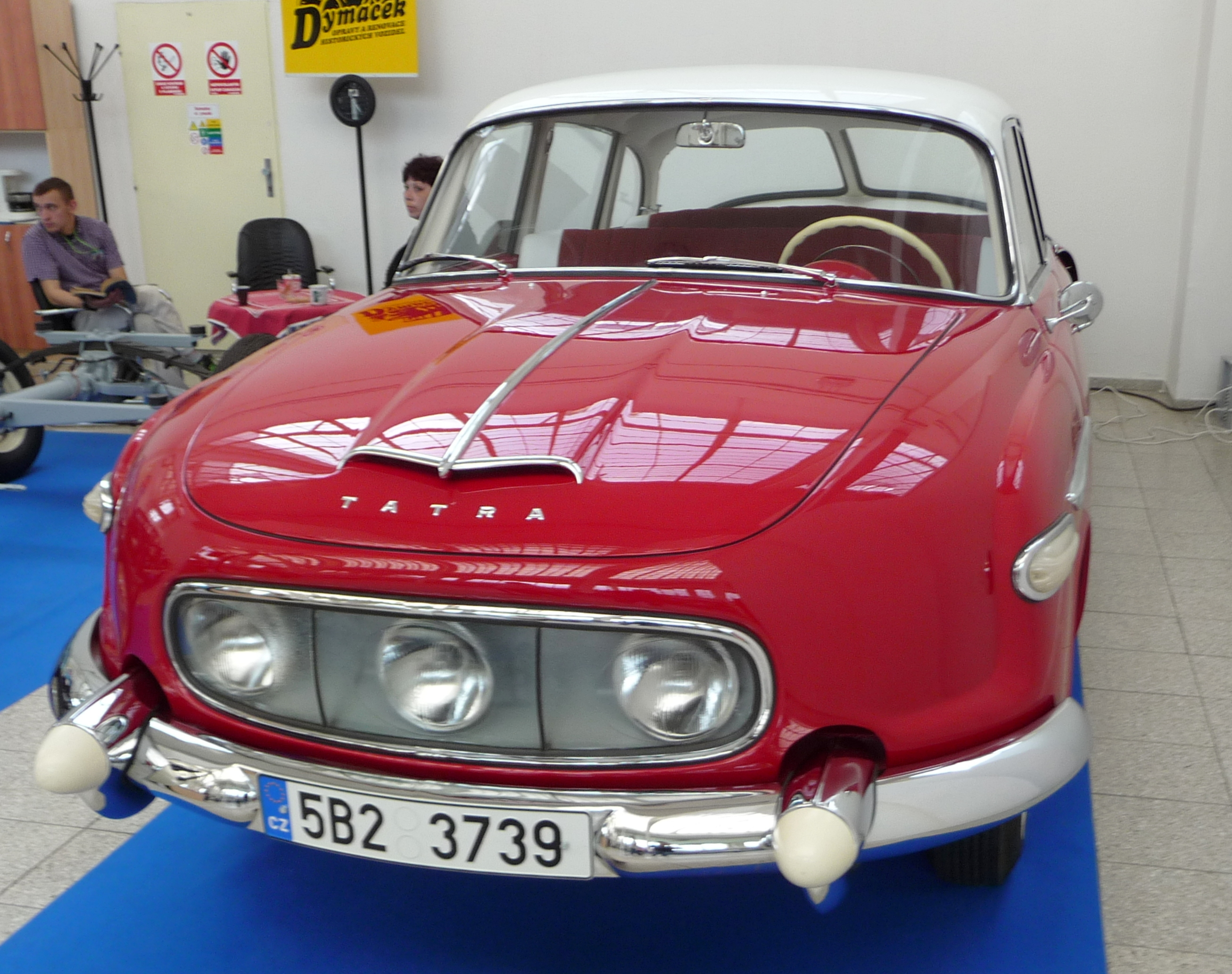
Tatra 603 (603-1); the original design had three headlights

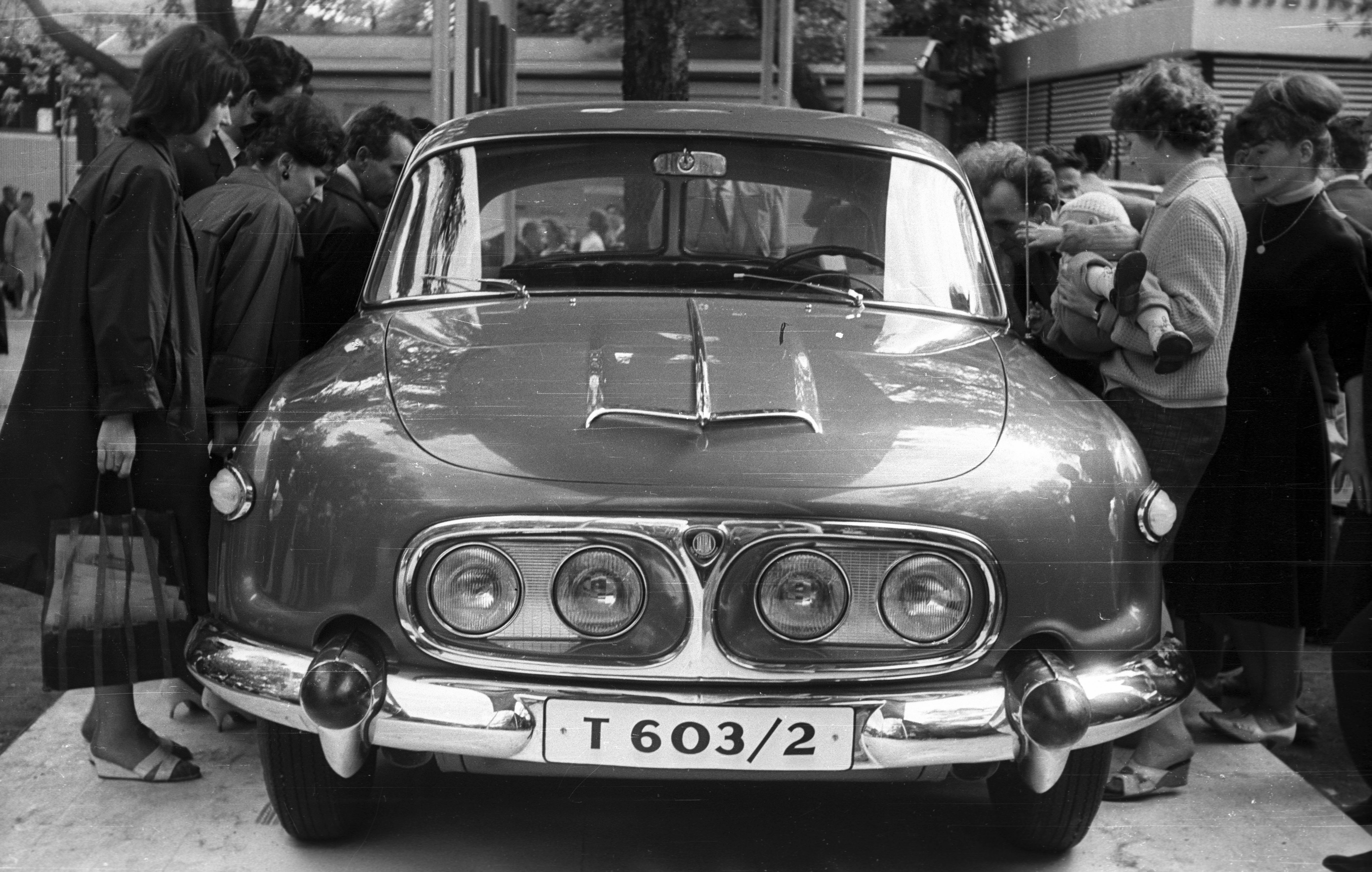
Tatra 603-2 (also 2-603); facelifted model with four close-mounted headlights

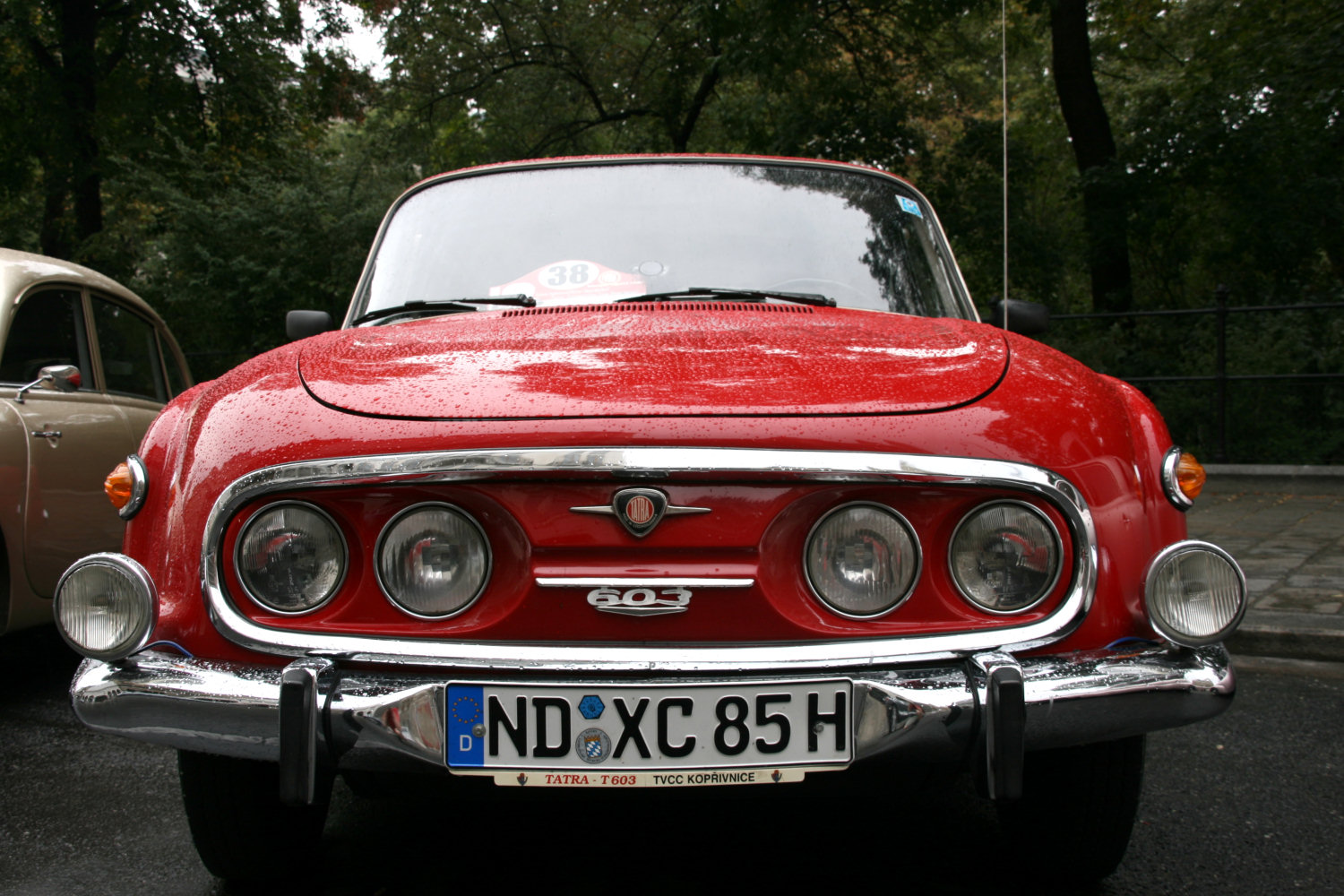
The front light arrangement on the 1969–1975 T 2-603 II, mounted further apart than earlier

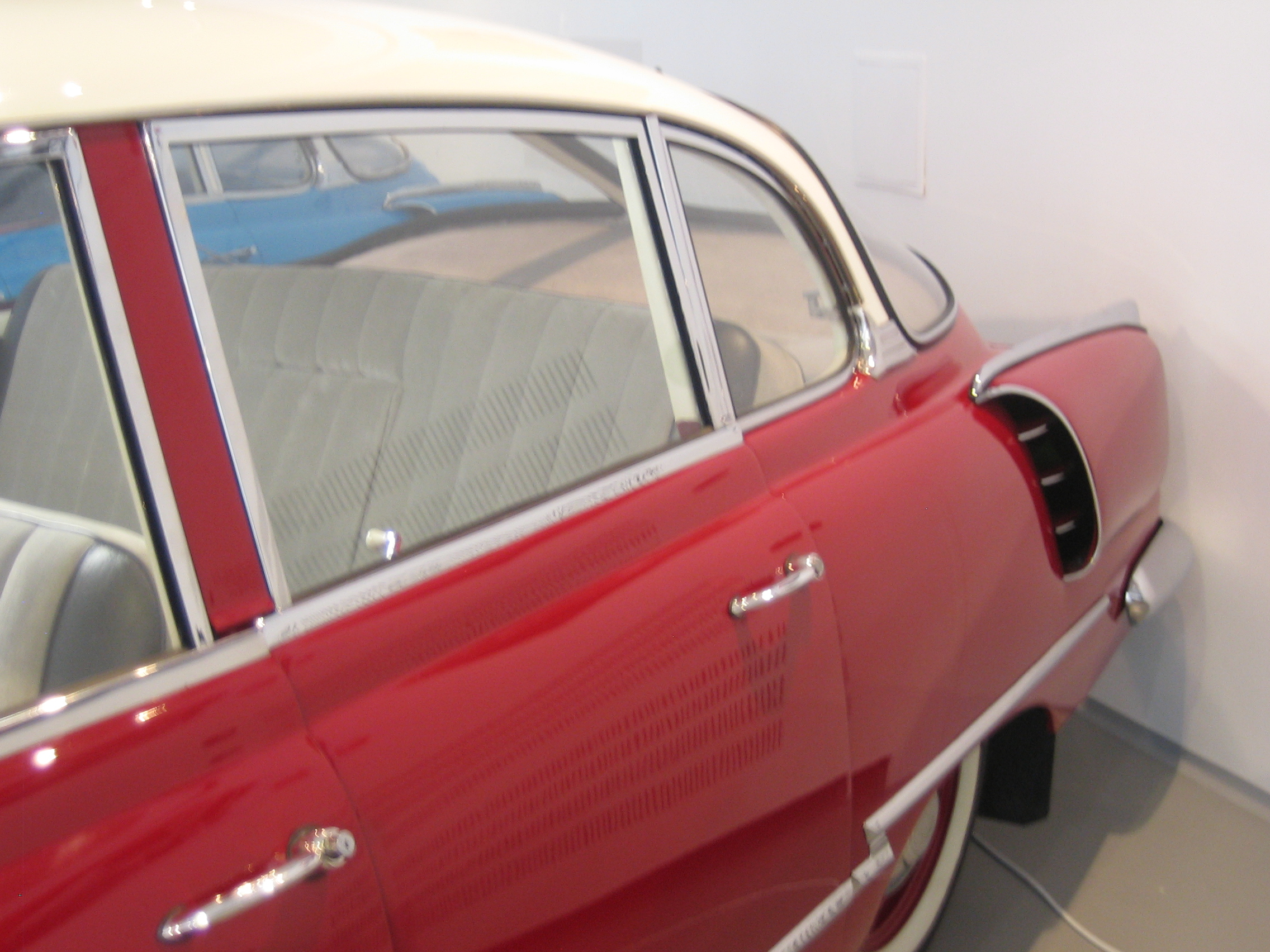
Air intake on T603 and early T 2-603

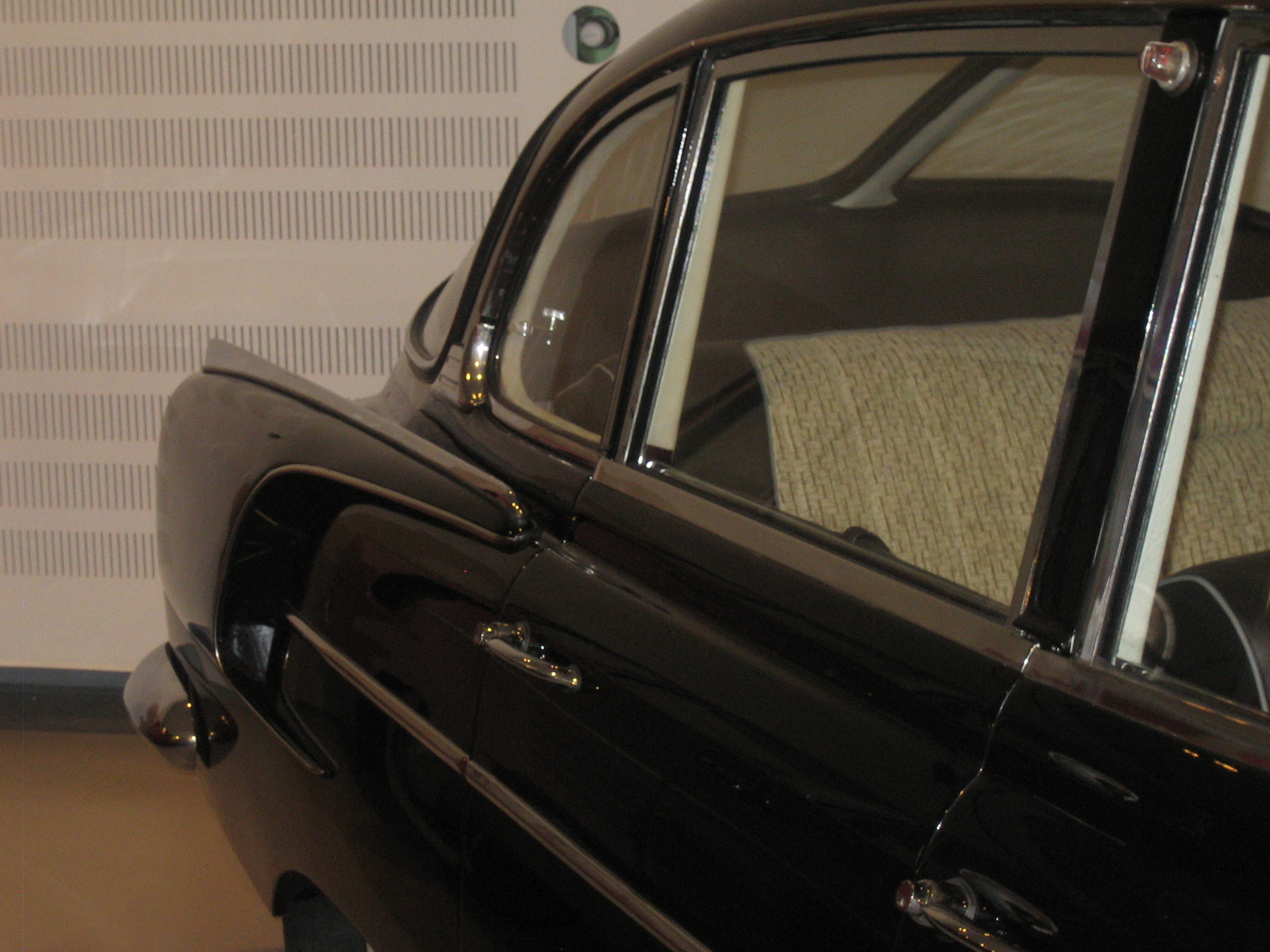
Air intake on late T 2-603 and T 2-603 II

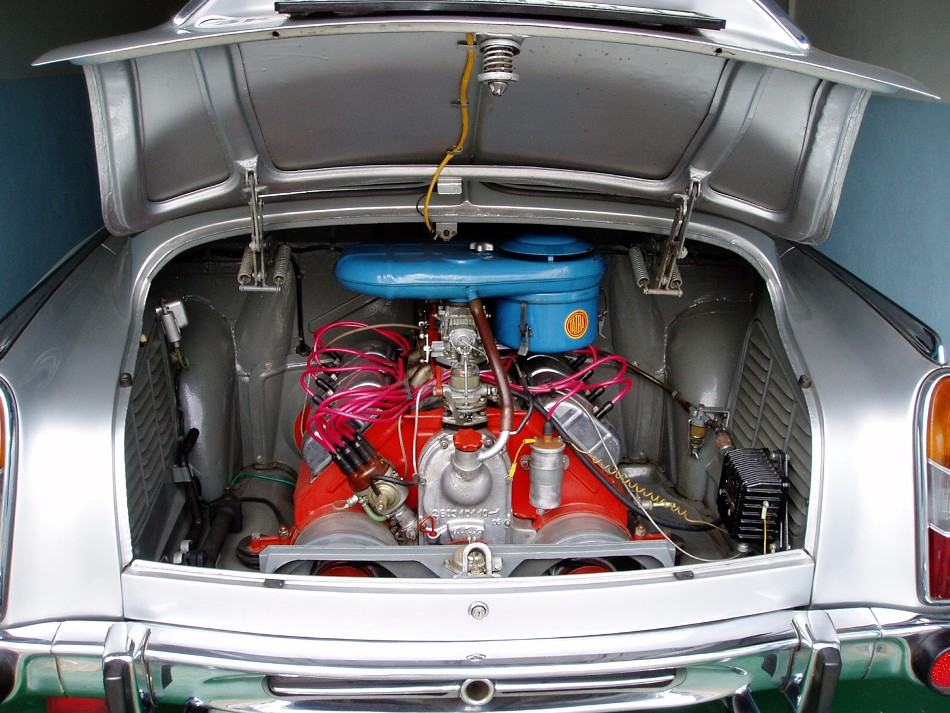
T603 H engine

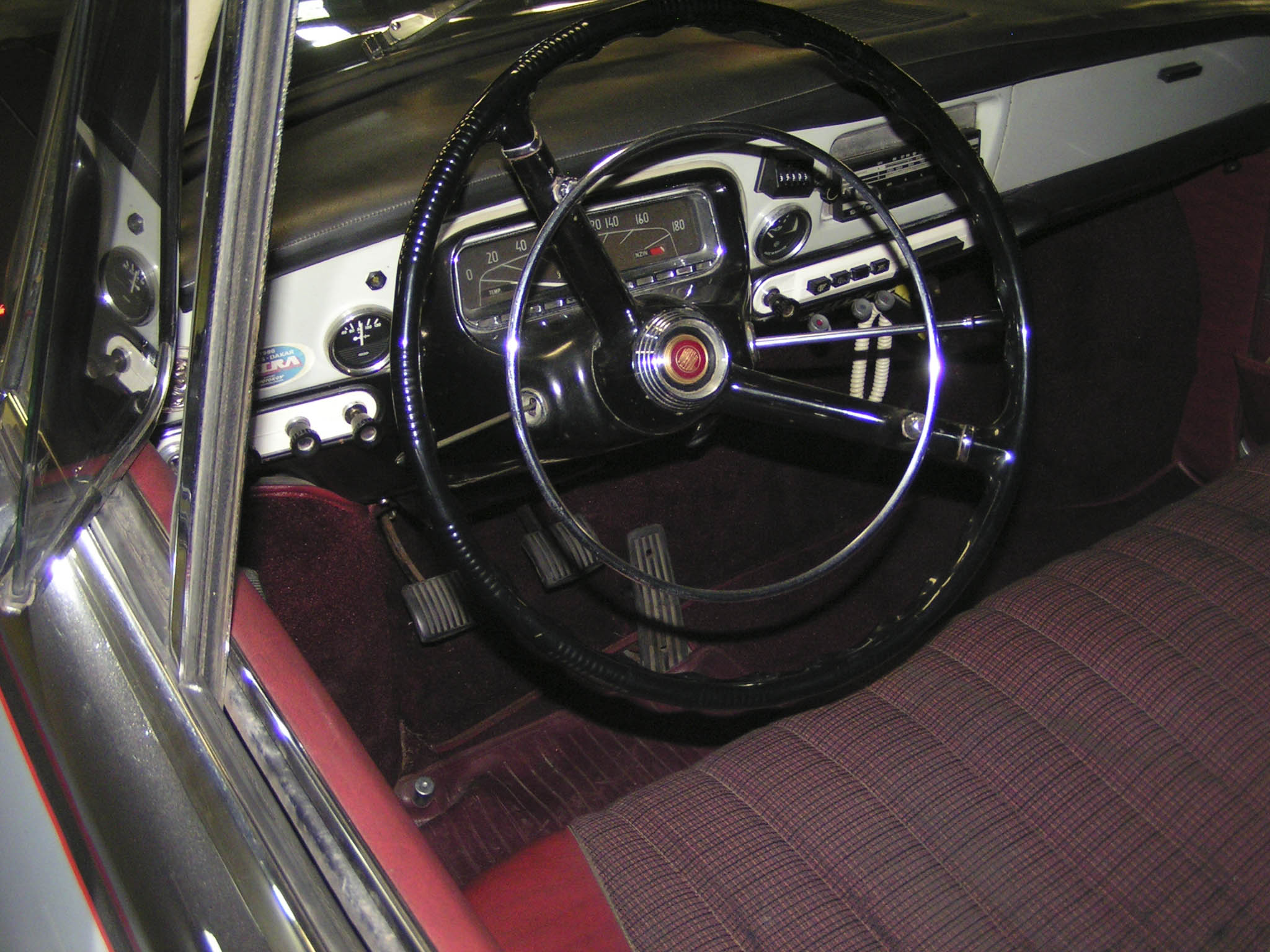
T603 interior (after 1962)

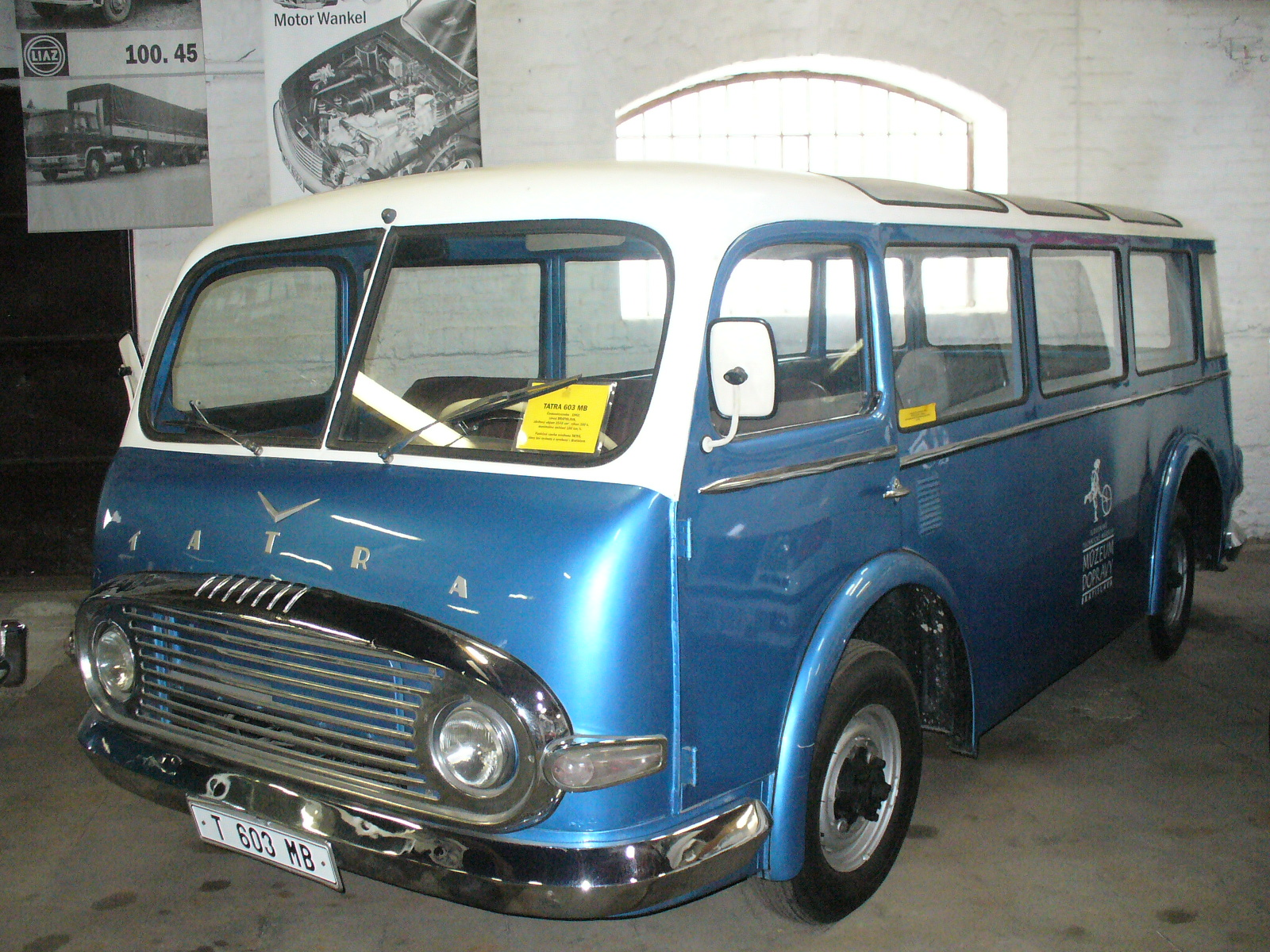
In 1961 the Tatra's Bratislava branch came up with the microbus T 603 MB design. Later a similar pick-up truck was also made, named T 603 NP. Both had the 603 engine mounted in front.

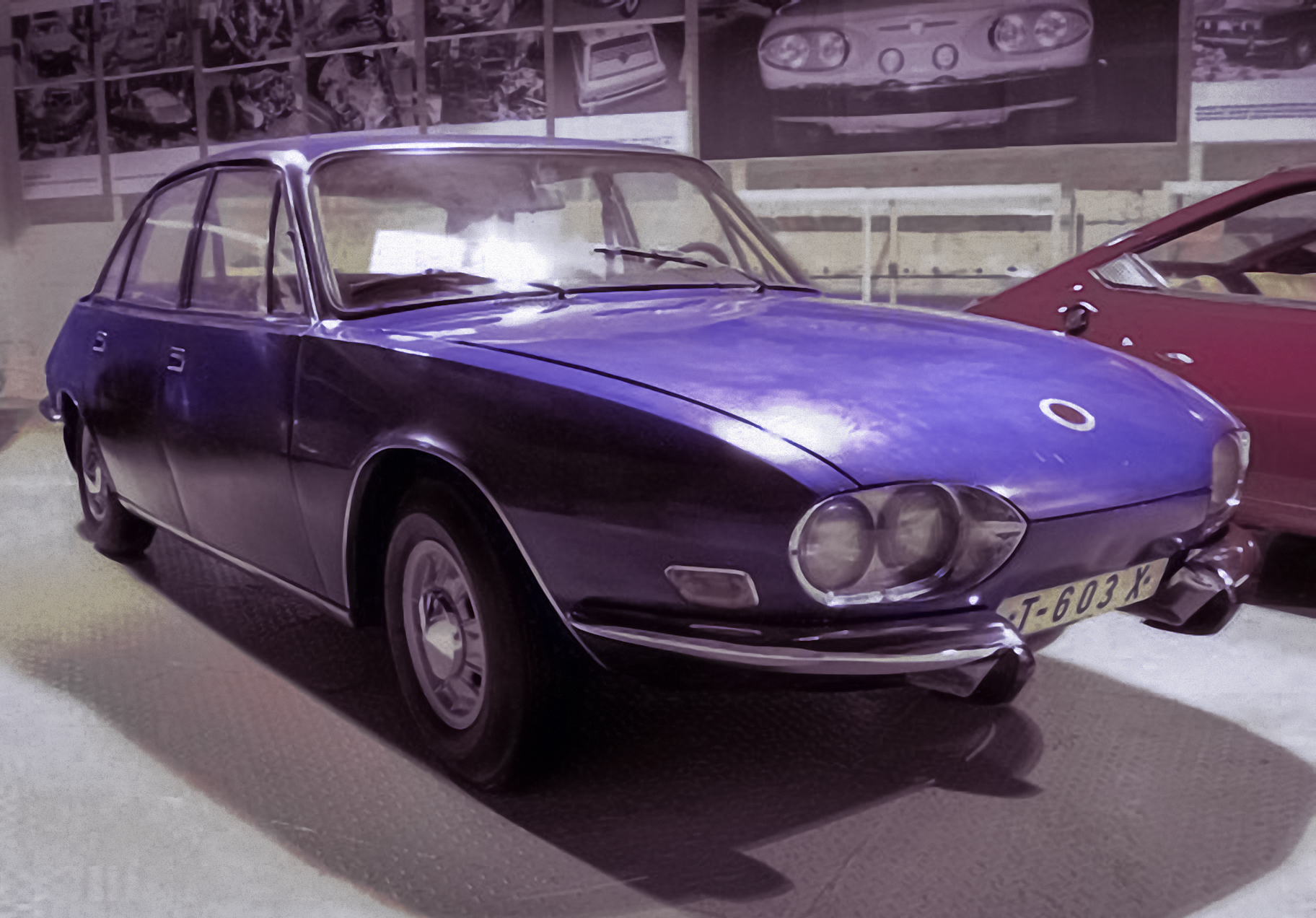
In 1967 another prototype was made in Bratislava, this time it was a new body style for the T603.

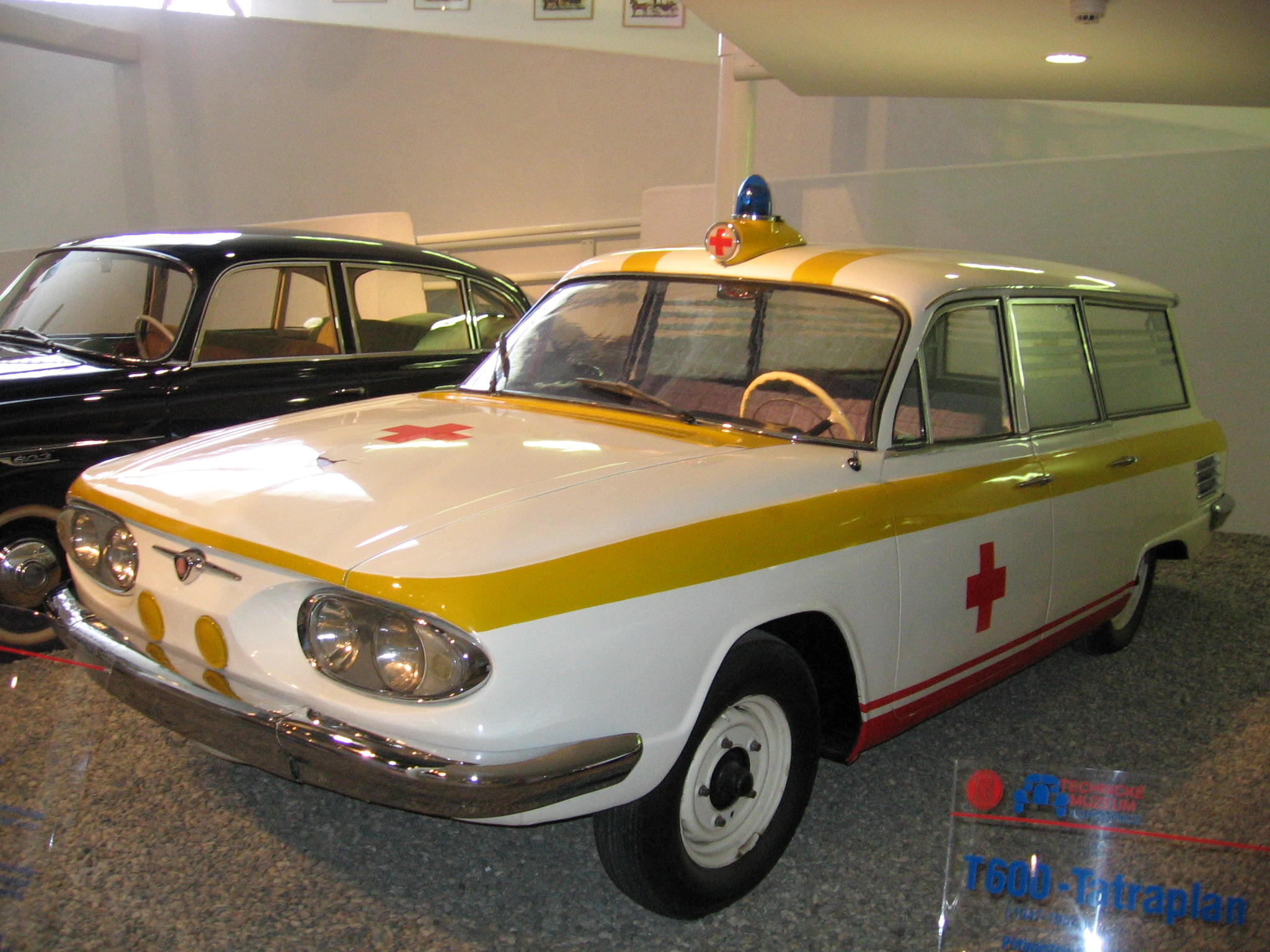
An estate car version was also proposed, primarily to serve as an ambulance. This one never saw production either; only the T 613 successor ambulance which entered service decades later.
