= Tatra V570 =

V570
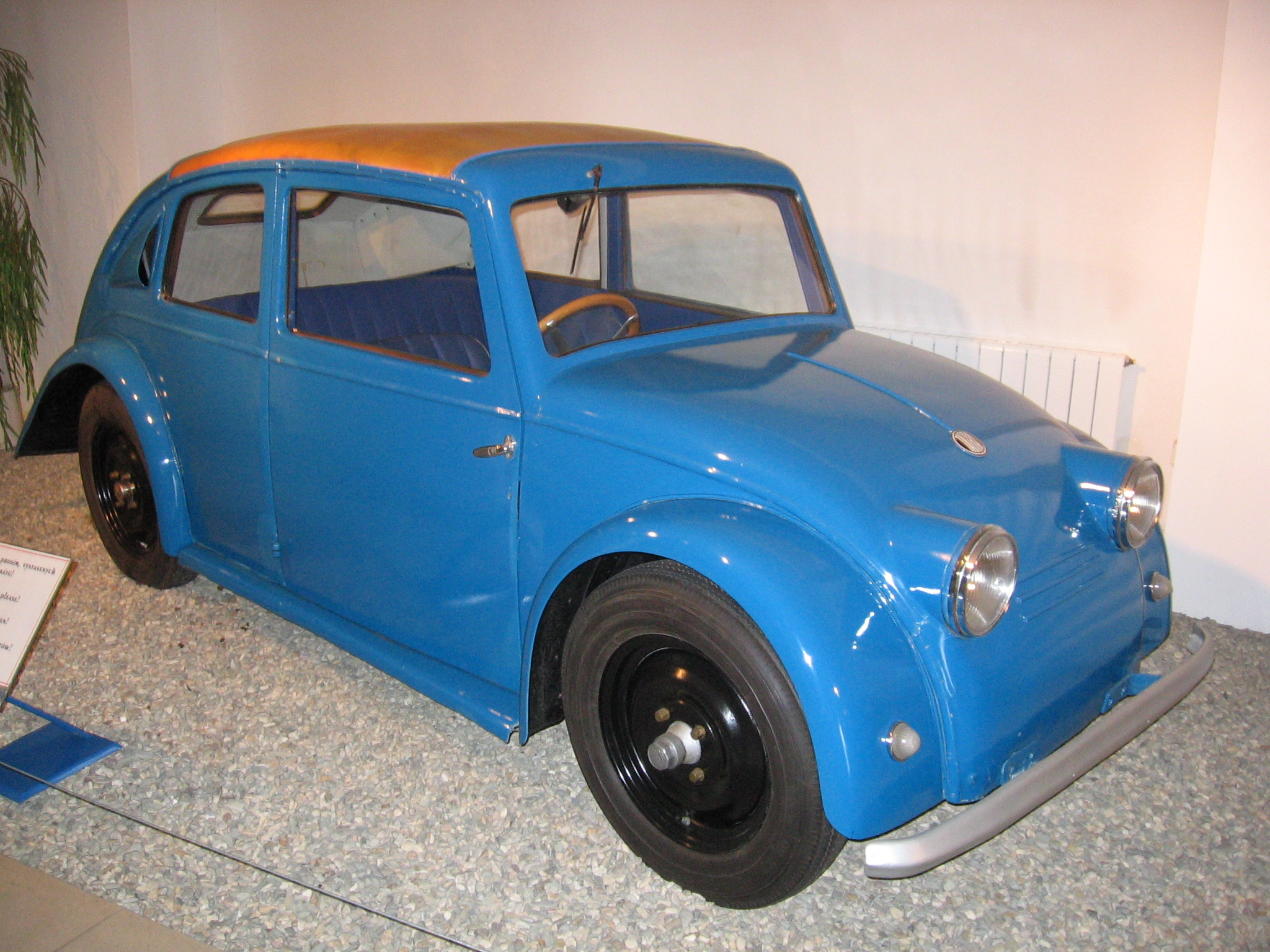

Overview
- Manufacturer: TATRA, a. s.
- Production: 1931 initial T57-V570 prototype 1933 second streamlined prototype
- Assembly: Kopřivnice, Moravia, Czechoslovakia
- Designer: Erich Ledwinka, Erich Übelacker, Hans Ledwinka, Paul Jaray

Body and chassis
- Class: Subcompact; Economy car
- Layout: RR layout

Powertrain
- Engine: 854 cc air-cooled boxer
- Transmission: 4-speed manual

Dimensions
- Wheelbase: 2,320 mm (91.3 in)
- Length: 3,800 mm (149.6 in)
- Width: 1,400 mm (55.1 in)
- Height: 1,440 mm (56.7 in)

Chronology
- Successor: Tatra T97

The Tatra V570 was a prototype 1931-33 car developed by a team led by Hans Ledwinka, Erich Ledwinka and Erich Übelacker. The aim of the construction team was to develop a cheap people's car with an aerodynamic body. The first T57-V570 prototype with rear air-cooled two-cylinder engine placed in the former rear luggage compartment of conventional T57 two-seater dropped head coupe was completed late in 1931. However, the company's management decided that the revolutionary ideas introduced in the prototype should be introduced in large luxurious cars, and therefore the team abandoned the project of small cars in favour of the Tatra T77, the world's first serially produced aerodynamic car. The project of a small car was later continued and led to introduction of the Tatra T97. The second, now streamlined V570 four-seater was built in 1933, two years before the first Volkswagen, which bears a strong resemblance to the Tatra – it was misappropriated in the opinion of Tatra, by Adolf Hitler and Dr. Ferdinand Porsche in circumstances about which the German company remains intensely sensitive.

In fact, Hungarian engineer Béla Barényi had sketched a design for a streamlined economy car with a rear-mounted boxer engine as early as 1924, nearly a decade earlier than both Tatra and Porsche, although it hadn't been published until 1934. Unlike the Tatra claim, Volkswagen has recognized Barényi as the "intellectual father" of the Volkswagen Beetle since 1955, after a legal battle spurred by statements in an official Porsche history book that Barényi considered slanderous.

== History ==
In the early 1930s Tatra engineers, under the direction of Hans Ledwinka's son Erich and design engineer Erich Übelacker, started work on the development of a small people's car with a rear-mounted engine in a backbone frame. Ledwinka believed that a rear-mounted engine RR layout would bring with it several big advantages – i.e. reducing the efficiency loss, noise and vibration of the driveshaft of the FR layout. No driveshaft meant there would be a flat floor with no need for central floor tunnel so that the passengers' seating position would be lower and well forward of the rear axle, which would lead to a lower centre of gravity, more favourable inter-axle weight distribution, and lower overall height. Mounting the engine in the rear would mean shortening the front part of the body to make a longer tail possible, which was consistent with the laws of aerodynamics. Also, engine noise would not disturb the passengers and would not be heard when driving at a speed of over 50 km/h. Air-cooling would be simpler and more effective at coping with the extremes of temperatures during the depths of winter and height of summer, than water cooling systems of the time, considering the climate in Central Europe. As the company was considering starting to manufacturing aeroplanes, it got experience with laws of aerodynamics and decided to apply them for the prospective car.

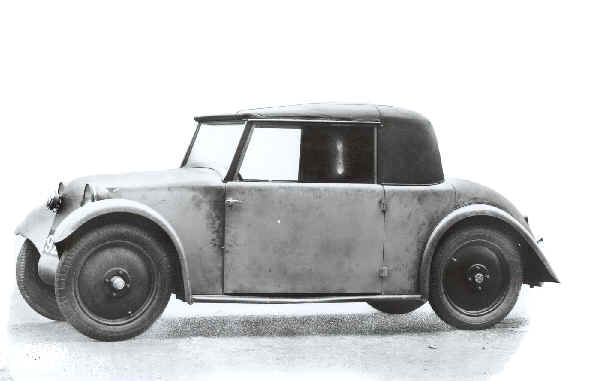
Tatra T57-V570 first prototype

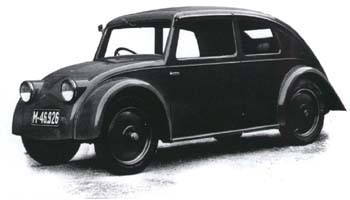
Tatra V570 final design

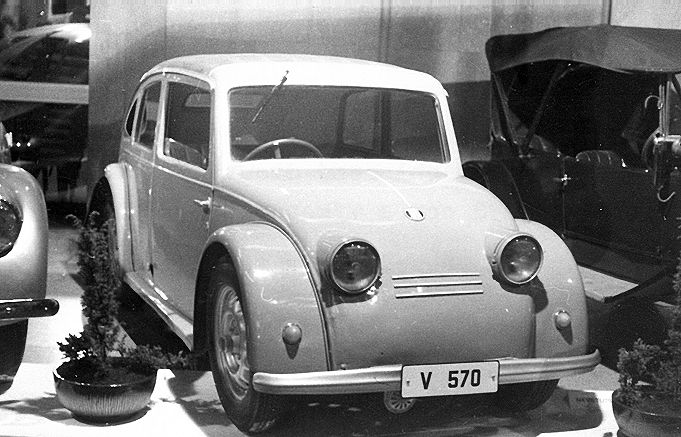
Tatra V570 final design

=== First prototype ===
The initial proposal of the concept was presented by Tatra designer Erich Übelacker, who previously worked on the Tatra 57 car. However, at the time Übelacker's proposal was strongly criticised by Ledwinka. When he was facing the prospect of leaving the company, he finally presented the project with aerodynamic car body with a teardrop rear, which would be used to accommodate the whole drive-line of the car. Paul Jaray, the noted Zeppelin designer, produced a prototype aerodynamic body for the standard Tatra 57. Übelacker was a mercurial young engineer with great imagination and a lot of enthusiasm - however he lacked the perseverance needed to bring his ideas to fruition, and that is when Ledwinka stepped in to finish the work which might otherwise have come to nothing. The new design was initially tried under a conventional T57 two-seater drophead coupe body, which was not aerodynamic (the first T57-V570 prototype). Two pieces of the first V570 were made in 1931.

=== Second prototype ===
The work on the second prototype's aerodynamic body started in 1933. The second prototype was based on patents using streamlining principles of Paul Jaray. It was not similar to the first conventional prototype, but this time it was equipped with an aerodynamic body. The lower part was following the lines of an aeroplane wing, while the upper part was supposed to be like a second wing added on top. The rear mudguards were incorporated into the body and the rear wheels were covered. The remnants of front mudguards became part of the front bonnet. The running boards were abandoned and accessories (i.e. door handles) were recessed into the body. The floor was flat and enclosed. The front window was inclined at a 45° angle.

The positioning of the engine at the rear and its cooling became a difficult task, which is demonstrated by the large number of patents considering the airflow to the rear engine compartment which Tatra registered at the time. The initial prototype had an engine derived from the Tatra 57 two-seater.

The final design had four seats. The engine was a two-cylinder air-cooled boxer 854 cc with a power rating of 18 HP at 3500 RPM. The engine, gear-box and half-axles were of unitary construction. The simple two door body had a timber frame. Although it was made purely to test different design ideas, it had good handling and could easily reach speeds of 80 km/h.

The responsibility for final construction was given to Hans Ledwinka's son Erich.

Serial production was considered. However, the Tatra 57's outstanding commercial success precluded it. The principles of V570 were later used in the Tatra T77 and Tatra T97 designs.

The car was later sold and its owner used it daily for 30 years, before it was handed back to Tatra factory museum.

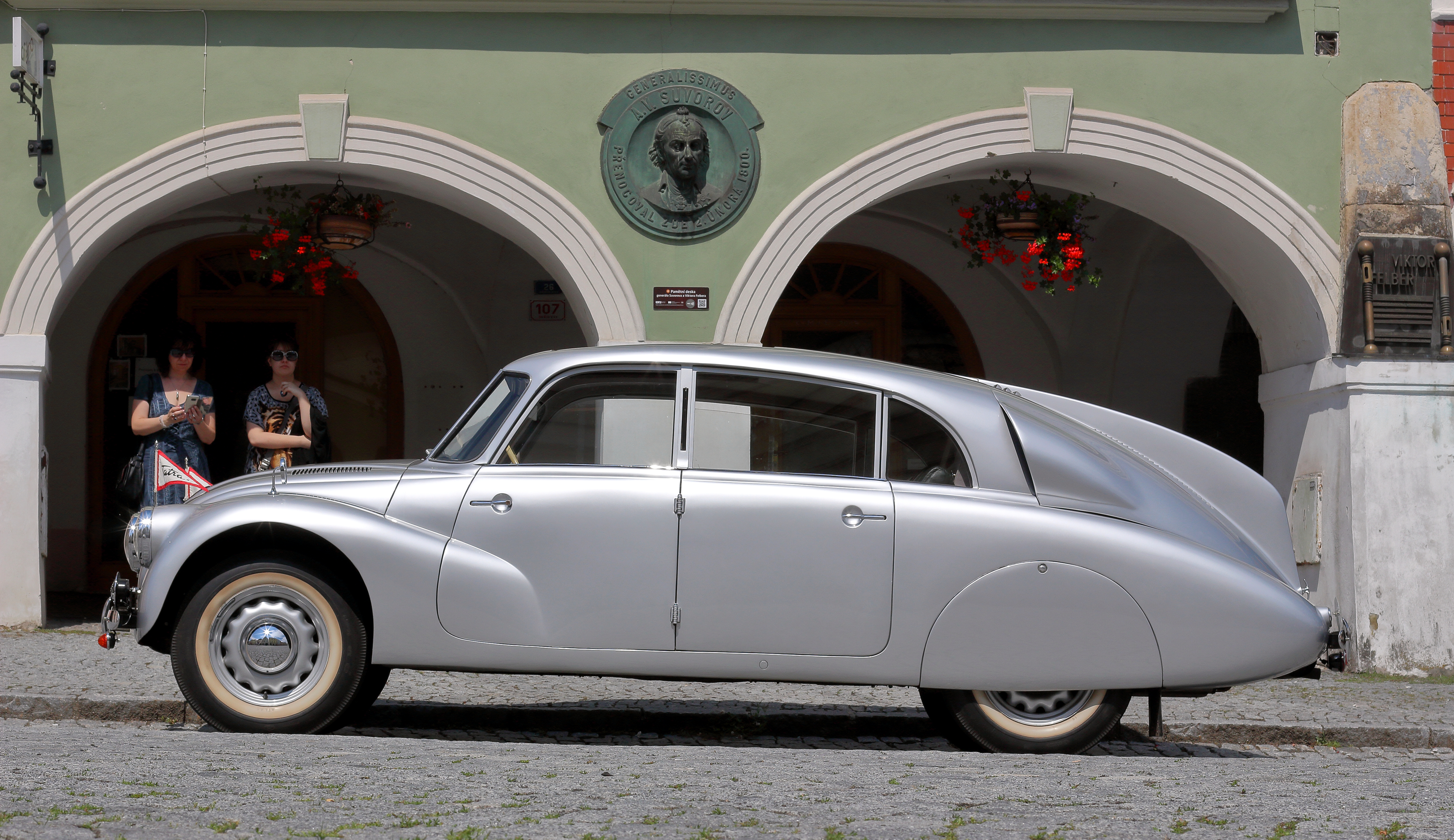
Tatra 87

Streamlined Tatras
- Tatra V570 1931, 1933
- Tatra 77 1933-1938
- Tatra 87 1936-1950
- Tatra 97 1936-1939
- Tatra T600 Tatraplan 1946-1952
- Tatra T603 1956-1975

== Literature ==
Ivan Margolius & John G. Henry,Tatra - The Legacy of Hans Ledwinka, Veloce Publishing, Dorchester 2015
