= Tatra 87 =

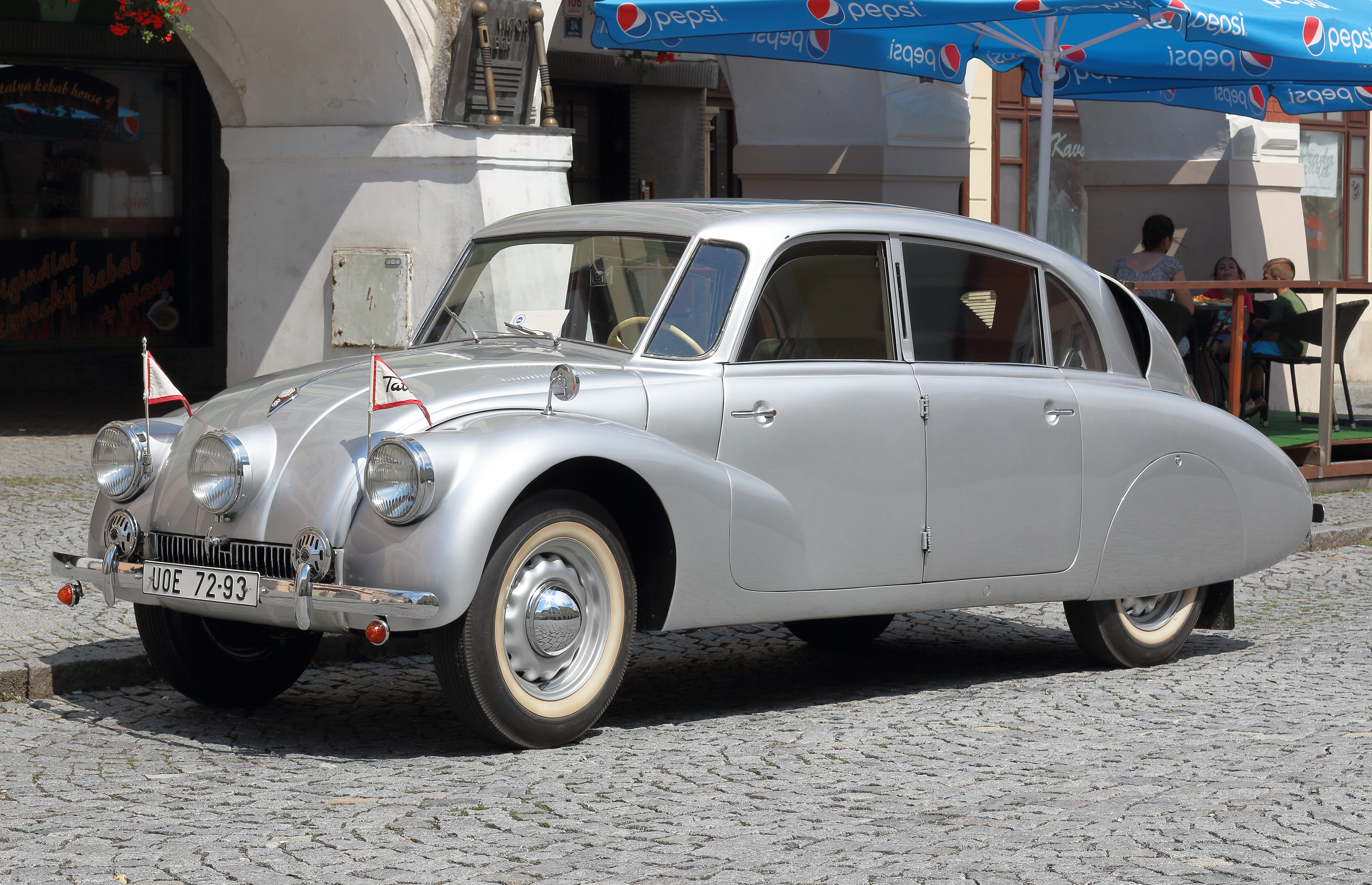

Overview
- Manufacturer: Tatra
- Production: 1936–1950; 3,056 produced
- Assembly: Kopřivnice, Moravia, Czechoslovakia
- Designer: Hans Ledwinka; Erich Übelacker

Body and chassis
- Class: Luxury car, 5-seater Sedan
- Body style: limousine (finned fastback)
- Layout: RR layout

Powertrain
- Engine: 2969 cc (3.0L) Tatra 87 V8
- Transmission: 4-speed manual (3 and 4 synchronized)

Dimensions
- Wheelbase: 2,850 mm (112.2 in)
- Length: 4,740 mm (186.6 in)
- Width: 1,670 mm (65.7 in)
- Height: 1,500 mm (59.1 in)
- Curb weight: 1,370 kg (3,020 lb)

Chronology
- Predecessor: Tatra 77a
- Successor: Tatra 603

The Tatra 87 (T87) is a car built by Czechoslovak manufacturer Tatra from 1936 to 1950. It was powered by a rear-mounted, 2.9-litre, air-cooled, 90°, overhead cam V8 engine that produced 85 horsepower and could drive the car at nearly 100 mph (160 km/h). It is ranked among the fastest production cars of its time. Competing cars in this class, however, used engines with almost twice the displacement, and with fuel consumption of 20 litres per 100 km (11.8 mpg). Thanks to its aerodynamic shape, the Tatra 87 had a consumption of just 12.5 litres per 100 km (18.8 mpg). After the war, between 1950 and 1953, T87s were fitted with more modern 2.5-litre V8 T603 engines.

The 87 was used by Hanzelka and Zikmund for their travel through Africa and Latin America from 1947 to 1950.

== Design ==
The Tatra 87 has unique bodywork. Its streamlined shape was designed by Hans Ledwinka and Erich Übelacker and was based on the Tatra 77, the first car designed with aerodynamics in mind. The body design was based on proposals submitted by Paul Jaray of Hungarian descent, who designed the famous German Graf Zeppelin dirigibles. A fin in the sloping rear of the Tatra helps to divide the air pressure on both sides of the car, a technique used later in aircraft. Tatra 87 had a drag coefficient of 0.36 as tested in the VW tunnel in 1979, as well as a reading of 0.244 for a 1:5 model tested in 1941.

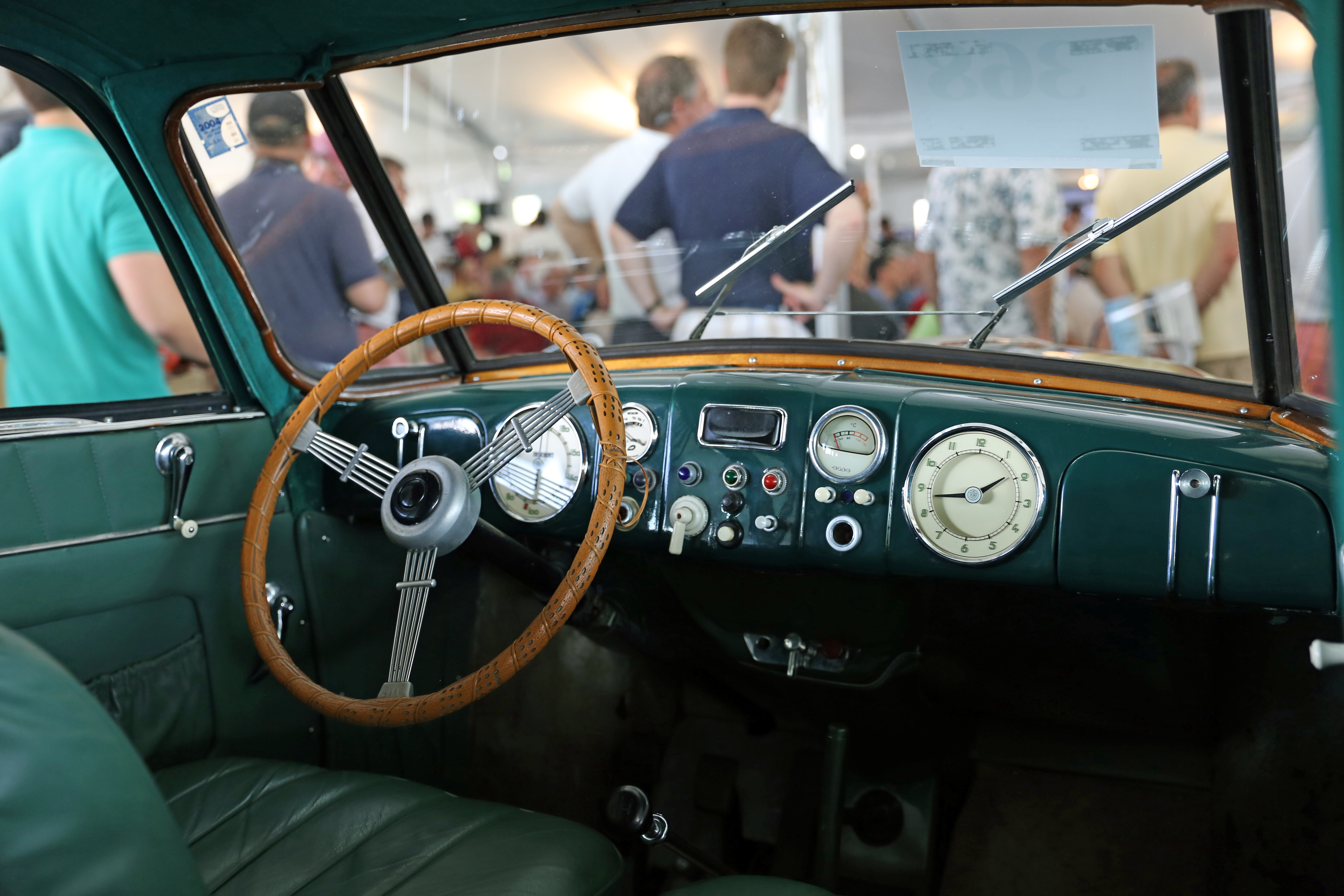
Art deco-styled dashboard in a 1947 T87

Small sets of windows in the dividers between the passenger, luggage space, and engine compartments, plus louvres providing air for the air-cooled engine, allowed limited rear visibility. Its entire rear segment could be opened to service the engine. The front doors are rear-hinged coach doors, sometimes termed "suicide doors", while the rear doors are front-hinged.

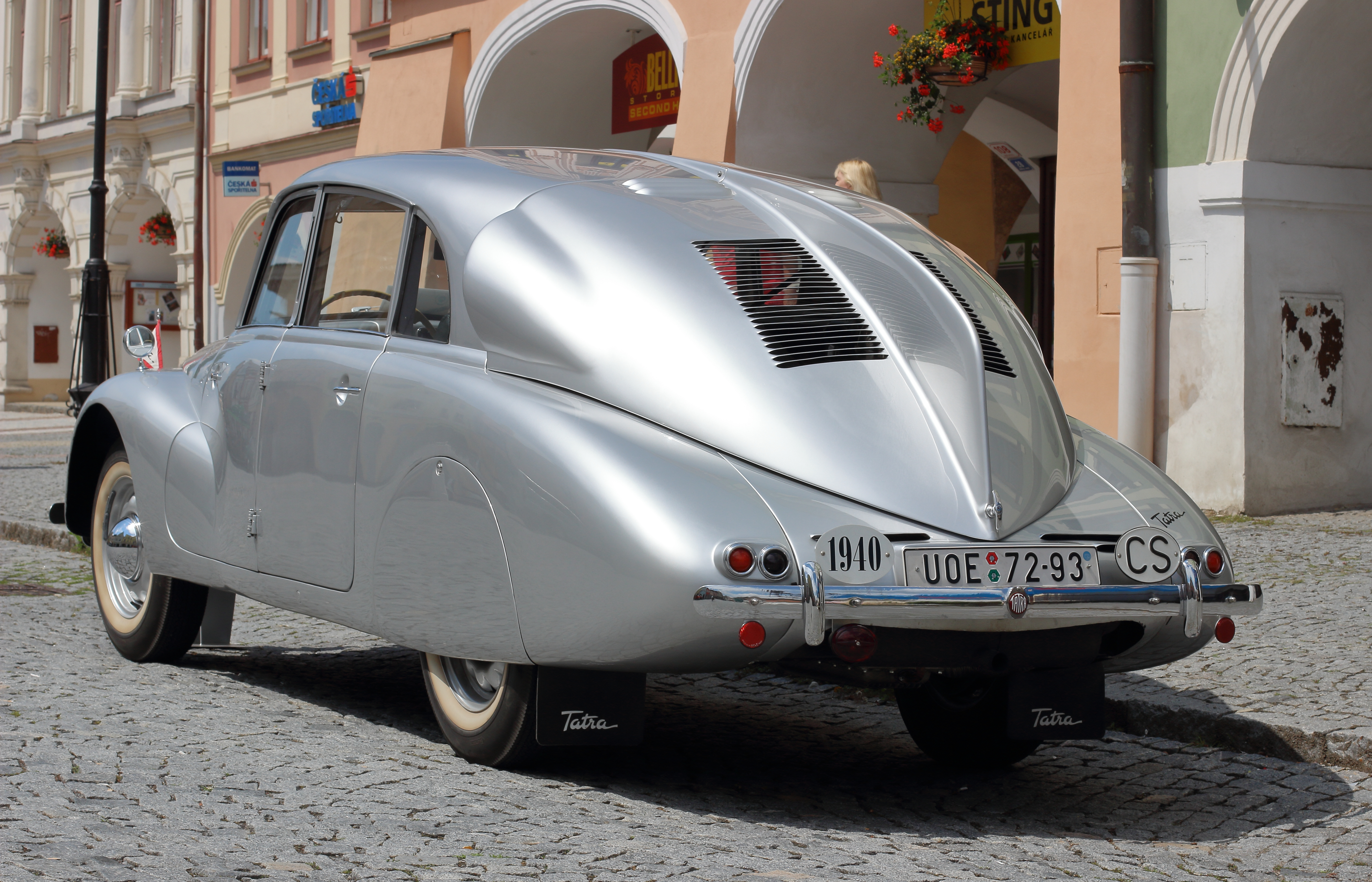
A 1940 Tatra 87 Saloon, showing the identifiable rear "sharks fin" and lack of rear windows

Many design elements of the Tatra 87, V570, and the later T97, were copied by later car manufacturers. Ferdinand Porsche was heavily influenced by the Tatra 87 and T97 and the flat-four-cylinder engine in his design of the Volkswagen Beetle, and was subsequently sued by Tatra.

The price new (in the 1940s) was 25,000 SFr. Its value today is around $125,000. A 1941 Tatra 87, owned and restored by Paul Greenstein and Dydia DeLyser of Los Angeles California, won a New York Times reader's poll of collectors' cars in 2010, beating strong competition from 651 cars.

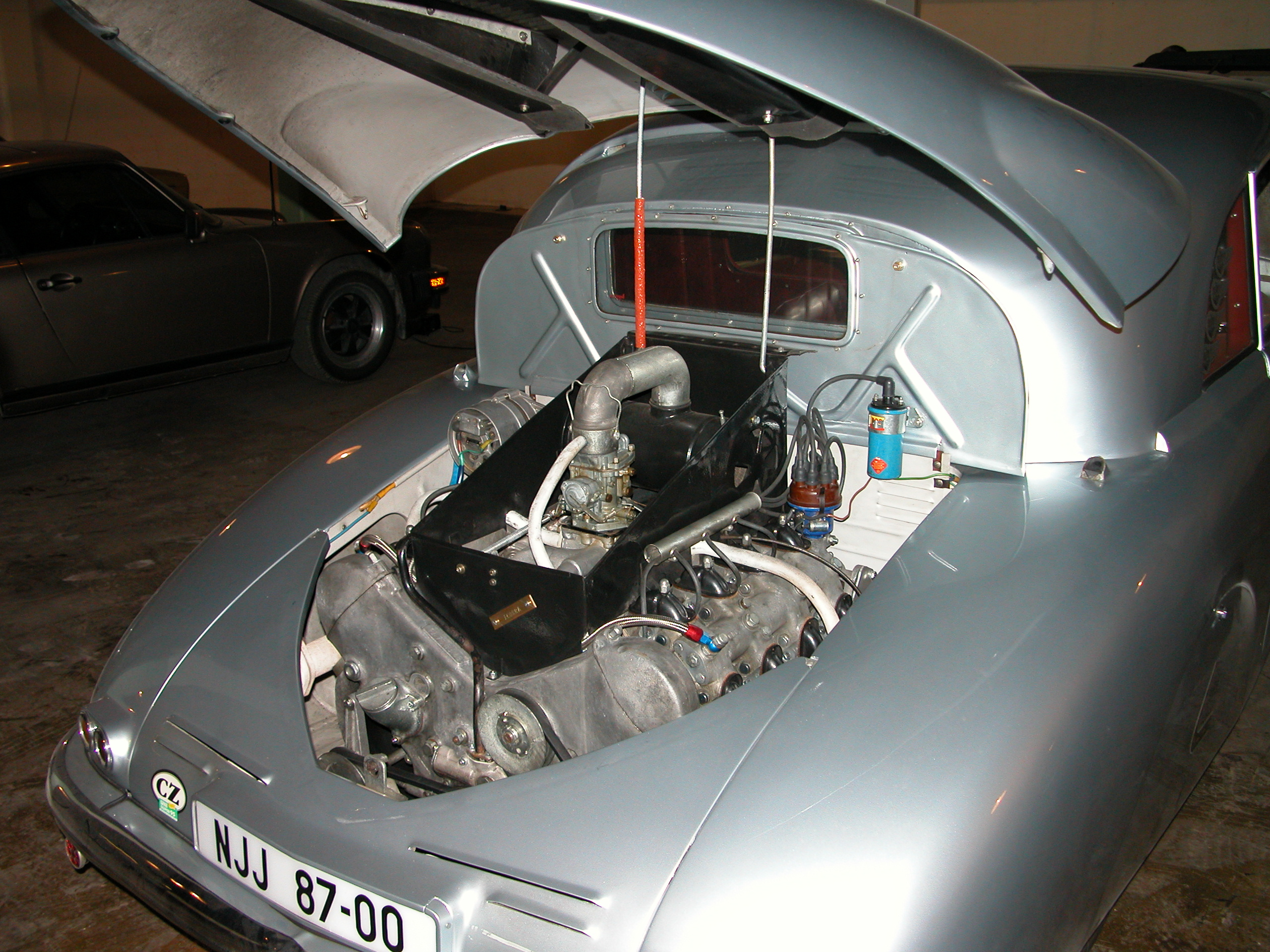
The entire rear segment of the Tatra 87 formed an engine cowling.

== Notable owners ==
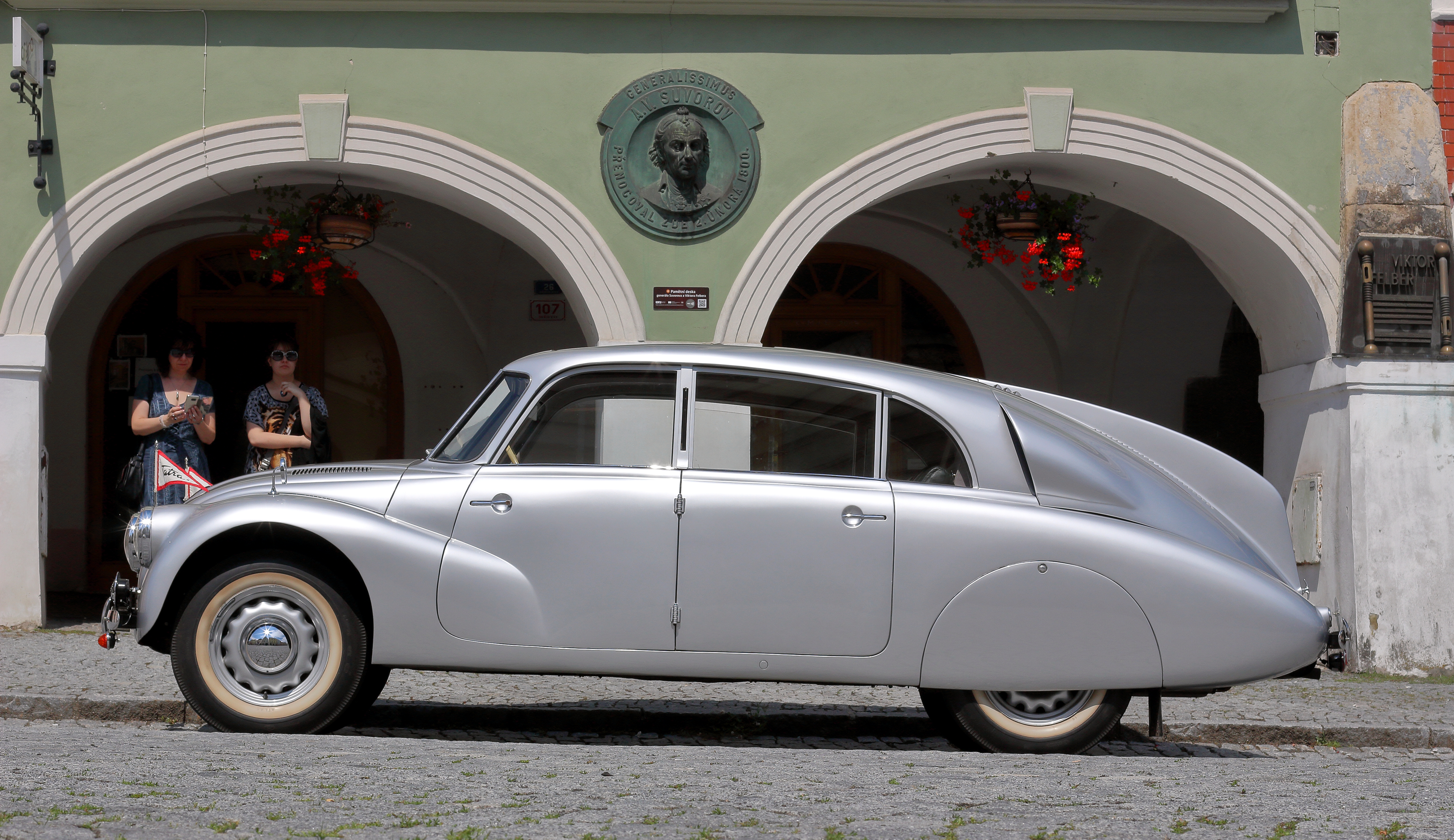

Streamlined Tatras
- Tatra V570 1931, 1933
- Tatra 77 1933–1938
- Tatra 87 1936–1950
- Tatra 97 1936–1939
- Tatra 600 Tatraplan 1946–1952
- Tatra 603 1956–1975
- Hans Ledwinka – the Tatra designer (he received one as a gift from Felix Wankel after retiring. This car is now on display in the Deutsches Museum in Munich.)
- Eliška Junková – one of the greatest female drivers in Grand Prix motor racing history
- Ernst Heinkel – German Nazi aircraft designer, whose company produced the world's first turbojet aircraft and jet plane, as well as the first rocket aircraft
- Felix Wankel – German engineer, inventor of the Wankel engine
- Emil František Burian – Czech poet, journalist, singer, actor, musician, composer, dramatic adviser, playwright, and director
- Vítězslav Nezval – one of the most prolific avant-garde Czech writers in the first half of the twentieth century and a co-founder of the Surrealist movement in Czechoslovakia
- Erwin Rommel – German General and Field Marshal of World War II (used also Tatra's Czech competitor, Škoda Superb, in the field)
- Andrey Yeryomenko – Soviet General and Field Marshal of World War II (received the first T87 manufactured after WW2 as a present, this car is now on display in the Tatra museum)
- John Steinbeck – American writer
- Farouk I of Egypt – the tenth ruler from the Muhammad Ali Dynasty and the penultimate King of Egypt and Sudan
- Josef Beran – Czech Cardinal of the Roman Catholic Church and Archbishop of Prague
- Edvard Beneš – a leader of the Czechoslovak independence movement, Minister of Foreign Affairs, and the second President of Czechoslovakia
- Antonín Zápotocký, Klement Gottwald – communist leaders, presidents of Czechoslovakia after the 1948 coup d'état
- Jay Leno – an American stand-up comedian and television host
- Norman Foster – a British architect

The Tatra 87 was praised by German officers in World War II for the superior speed and handling it offered for use on the Autobahn. The Nazi armaments and munitions minister Fritz Todt declared: "This 87 is the Autobahn car ..." It was known, however, as the "Czech secret weapon" because it killed so many Nazi officers during World War II that the German Army eventually forbade its officers from driving the Tatra. However, this alleged story has never been proven and is considered apocryphal; the order forbidding the T87 use was imposed only after several nonfatal accidents.
