= Steyr-Puch Haflinger =

Austrian light utility vehicle

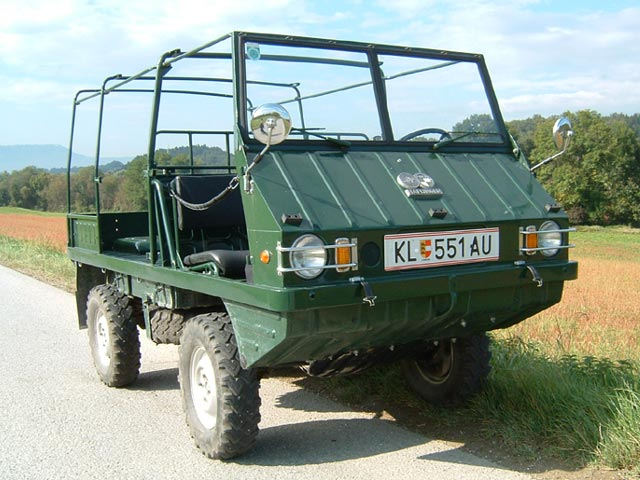

Overview
- Type: Military light utility vehicle
- Manufacturer: Steyr-Daimler-Puch
- Production: 1958–1974
- Designer: Erich Ledwinka

Body and chassis
- Layout: Rear-engine, four-wheel-drive layout
- Chassis: Backbone

Powertrain
- Engine: 643cc air-cooled H2
- Transmission: 4-speed manual 5-speed manual

Dimensions
- Wheelbase: SWB: 1,500 mm (59.1 in) LWB: 1,800 mm (70.9 in)
- Length: SWB: 2,830 mm (111.4 in) LWB: 3,150 mm (124.0 in)
- Width: 1,350 mm (53.1 in)
- Curb weight: 635 kg (1,400 lb)

The Haflinger is a small, lightweight, four-wheel-drive, high-mobility cab-over vehicle about 2.8 m long (3.15 m for the long-wheelbase version) and 1.3 m wide, powered by a 643 cc horizontally opposed flat-twin, rear-mounted air-cooled engine. Weighing around 635 kg (1400 lb), the Haflinger can be lifted by four strong people and yet can carry a load of 515 kg (1135.3 lb). This truck falls into the category of the light utility vehicle. It was produced between 1959 and 1974 by the Austrian manufacturer Steyr-Daimler-Puch.

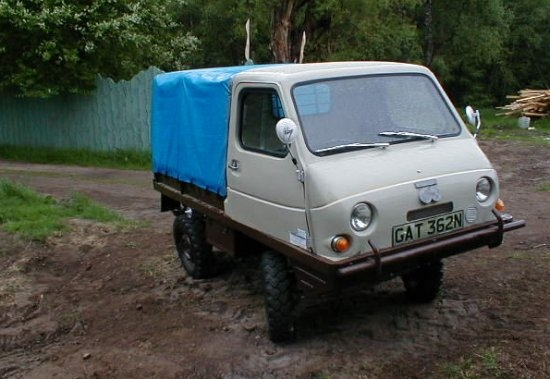
1976 Steyr-Puch Haflinger with fibreglass closed cab

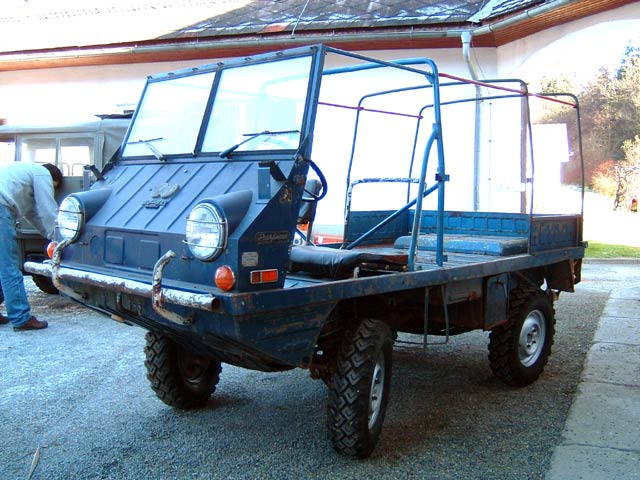
US-Version "Pathfinder" (1971)

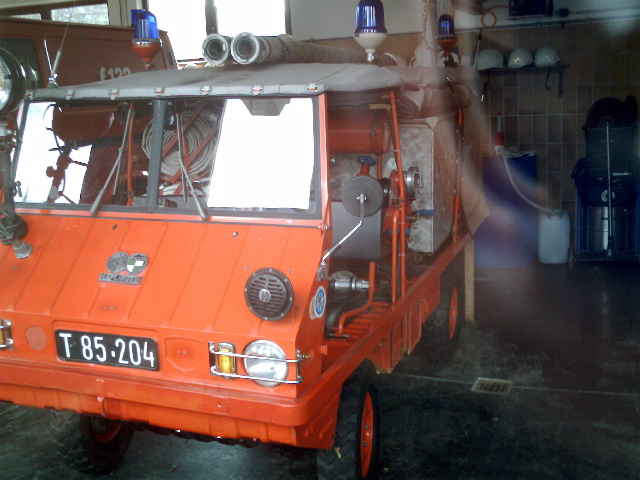
Haflinger used as a fire vehicle. 2007 in Ellmau, Austria

== History ==
After WWII, the newly organized Austrian Army was equipped with the surplus US Army Willys MB and Ford GPW Jeep. A decade after hostilities ended, the Austrian Army was considering the retirement of the aging Jeeps in favor of something more contemporary as well as locally designed and produced. The design genius of Erich Ledwinka (son of legendary Tatra designer and father of the Volkswagen Beetle Hans Ledwinka) was utilized by the Austrian firm Steyr-Daimler-Puch to produce and field test prototypes. Its extensive similarities with the larger Tatra all wheel drive trucks are obvious, it has even been referred to as "A little Tatra". Once the production model design was finalized, the trucks were manufactured between 1959 and 1974 and were exported all over the world. The manufacturer designated the trucks as "Type Multipurpose Passenger Vehicle". A total of 16,647 were made. (See Military Use below.)

The majority of the Haflinger trucks entered directly into the hands of private owners around the world with a small number also being placed into municipal, ambulance and fire brigade services. Like its predecessor, the US Army Jeep, Haflinger trucks are at home both off and on road. They have been licensed for on-road use throughout Europe, North and South America, Asia, Africa and Australia. During their 16-year production run they were sold in Austria and exported to 35 other countries. The first trucks to see use in the United States arrived in 1960. In 1983 one was driven from Vermont to California, while Austrian travel journalist Ernst Wiese in his book 10,000 Miles Through Arabia described his four-month return journey from Vienna to the southern tip of the Arabian peninsula. Its multi-functional capabilities meant it was described as a car, a truck and the "Austrian Jeep".

== Military use ==
Approximately 7,000 Haflingers were recruited into military service by the Swiss, Austrian and Australian armies and the Royal Navy. Small numbers were also in use in Katanga and the Democratic Republic of Congo in the 1960s.

The Haflinger was adopted by the Australian Army as the Truck, Utility, 1/4 Ton, GS, Lightweight. 46 of the vehicles were procured by the Army in 1966 and were registered sequentially from 101-816 to 101-861. A bespoke, matching trailer, Trailer, Cargo, 1/4 Ton, was provisioned for each vehicle, and were registered sequentially from 101-862 to 101-907. Haflingers were often allocated to RAEME units where typically an individual craftsman, like artillery artificers, would use the vehicle to carry tools and other equipment around the field attending to technical servicing of weapons platforms and fighting vehicles.

Haflinger, Steyr Puch, is not listed in the table of Australian Army vehicles in Vietnam within the M Cecil book Mud & Dust, but a popular misconception may have occurred because of the US M274 Mechanical Mule which has a similar size and mechanical arrangement and was used to carry munitions and other equipment.

== Production ==
Year	Production figures
1958	8
1959	158
1960	1,092
1961	1,025
1962	2,609
1963	881
1964	1,088
1965	805
1966	788
1967	941
1968	1,774
1969	1,190
1970	1,625
1971	1,005
1972	651
1973	557
1974	450
Sum	16,647

== Features ==
Particular features that add to the off-road capability include:

- Exceptionally low centre of gravity due to the low placement of the chassis and the lack of upper bodywork
- Generous approach and departure angles
- The provision of both front and rear differential locks enables the vehicle to make progress even if only one wheel is in firm contact with the ground.
- The 'portal' type design of the front and rear axles means that the centre of the axle is above the centre of the wheel, thus increasing ground clearance under the axle without the need to increase the wheel diameter. Power is transmitted from the axle to the wheel via drop gears in each wheel hub.
- The suspension is fully independent, of the swing axle type both front and rear, each half-axle having about 25 cm of free movement.

== Haflinger fans ==
Most enthusiasts are found in Germany and Austria, where there are thriving clubs. There are also many owners/enthusiasts in the UK, USA, Canada, Australia, and Asia. One of the more important club meetings is held every year at the village of Hafling (Avelengo) in Italy.

The enthusiasts drive demand for vintage good-condition Haflingers, which in turn command high prices on the used car market.

== Trivia ==
Haflingers feature in the 1971 Doctor Who story Colony in Space, the location filming for which took place in a clay pit in Cornwall.

Steyr subsequently designed and produced a much larger vehicle of very similar layout to the Haflinger, called the Pinzgauer, which is available in both 4x4 and 6x6 versions.

The name originates from a horse breed of the same name.

Steyr Puch stood alone and had no input from the Daimler-Benz, i.e. Mercedes-Benz, until well after the production of Haflinger ceased.

Steyr Puch was an important light motorcycle manufacturer.

Their expertise in 4WD attracted Mercedes-Benz and they built the first G Wagens (Geländewagen) that were intended as an alternative to the military specification Land Rover. When Mercedes invested in Steyr Puch they started building both Puch and Mercedes badged vehicles.

G Wagens serve in the French Army albeit with Peugeot engines. Under Australian Department of Defence project Land 121 Mercedes-Benz G-Class have been introduced into Australian Army service to replace the ageing Land Rover Perentie

Note: The term 'G-Wagen' is only used in English-speaking parts of the world. It is originally called 'G-Klasse' ('G-Class'), similar to the C-, E-, M-, R-, and S-Klasse in MB's nomenclature.

Also the links with Fiat were maintained as Steyr Puch made all the 4WD kit for the Panda and may still do to this day.

== Variants ==
The Haflinger changed very little during its years of production, but there are some notable changes and variants along the way:

- Series 1: original model, 4-speed gearbox
- Series 2: 5-speed gearbox (crawler gear) and a higher output engine
- Polycab: upper steel bodywork optionally replaced with a fully enclosed fibreglass cab
- SchneeWiesel: "Snow Weasel" with tires replaced by tracks for snow/ice operations
- Swiss Military: Series 1/2 hybrid with unique bumpers, canvas, and other details
- USA-spec: Larger "bugeye" headlights, other modifications to meet US requirements

== Australian assembly ==
Approximately 800 Haflingers were assembled and sold in Australia from 1966.

== See also ==
- AMC M422 'Mighty Mite'
- Pinzgauer
- LuAZ-967
