= Tatra 77 =

Tatra 77; Tatra 77a
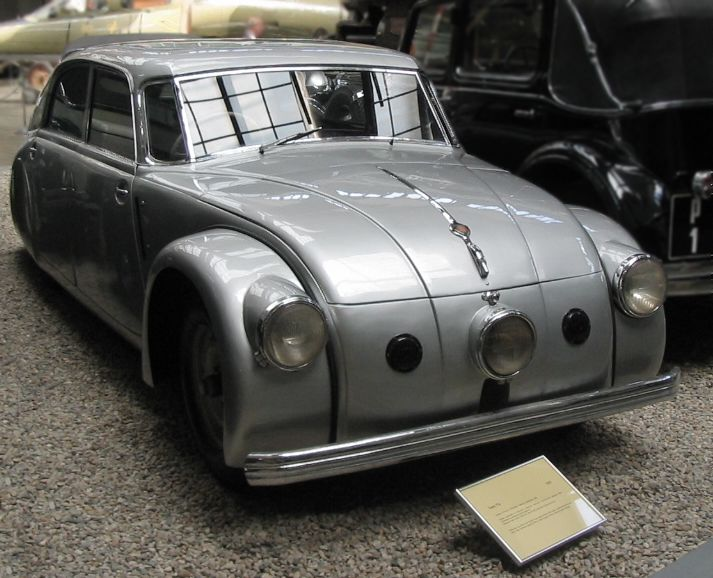

Overview
- Manufacturer: TATRA, a. s.
- Production: 1934–1935 (Tatra 77); 1935–1938 (Tatra 77a); 249 produced (+ 4 pre-serial in 1933)
- Assembly: Kopřivnice, Moravia, Czechoslovakia
- Designer: Hans Ledwinka; Erich Übelacker

Body and chassis
- Class: 4-door sedan Executive luxury vehicle
- Body style: limousine (Finned fastback, Cd=0.36)
- Layout: RR layout

Powertrain
- Engine: 3.0L Tatra 77 V8 (T77); 3.4L Tatra 77a V8 (T77a)
- Transmission: 4-speed manual

Dimensions
- Wheelbase: 3,150 mm (124.0 in)
- Length: 5,000–5,200 mm (196.9–204.7 in) (T77); 5,300–5,400 mm (208.7–212.6 in) (T77a)
- Width: 1,650 mm (65.0 in) (T77); 1,660 mm (65.4 in) (T77a)
- Height: 1,420–1,500 mm (55.9–59.1 in) (T77); 1,600 mm (63.0 in) (T77a)
- Kerb weight: 1,700 kg (3,700 lb) (T77); 1,800 kg (4,000 lb) (T77a)

Chronology
- Predecessor: Tatra V570
- Successor: Tatra 87

The Tatra 77 (T77) is one of the first serial-produced, truly aerodynamically-designed automobiles, produced by Czechoslovak company Tatra from 1934 to 1938. It was developed by Hans Ledwinka and Paul Jaray, the Zeppelin aerodynamic engineer. Launched in 1934, the Tatra 77 is a coach-built automobile, constructed on a platform chassis with a pressed box-section steel backbone rather than Tatra's trademark tubular chassis, and is powered by a 60 horsepower (45 kW) rear-mounted 2.97-litre air-cooled V8 engine, in later series increased to a 75 horsepower (56 kW) 3.4-litre engine. It possessed advanced engineering features, such as overhead valves, hemispherical combustion chambers, a dry sump, fully independent suspension, rear swing axles and extensive use of lightweight magnesium alloy for the engine, transmission, suspension and body. The average drag coefficient of a 1:5 model of a Tatra 77 was recorded as 0.2455. The later model T77a, introduced in 1935, has a top speed of over 150 km/h (93 mph) due to its advanced aerodynamic design which delivers an exceptionally low drag coefficient of 0.212. Sources claim that this is the coefficient of a 1:5 scale model, not of the car itself, so the actual drag coefficient may have been slightly higher.

== History ==
The Tatra Company began manufacturing cars in 1897 in Kopřivnice, Moravia, in today's Czech Republic, making it the third-oldest still-existing automobile manufacturer in the world. Under the direction of Hans Ledwinka, the company employed many of the genius minds of automotive history, including Erich Übelacker and consultant Paul Jaray, who together designed the Tatra 77.

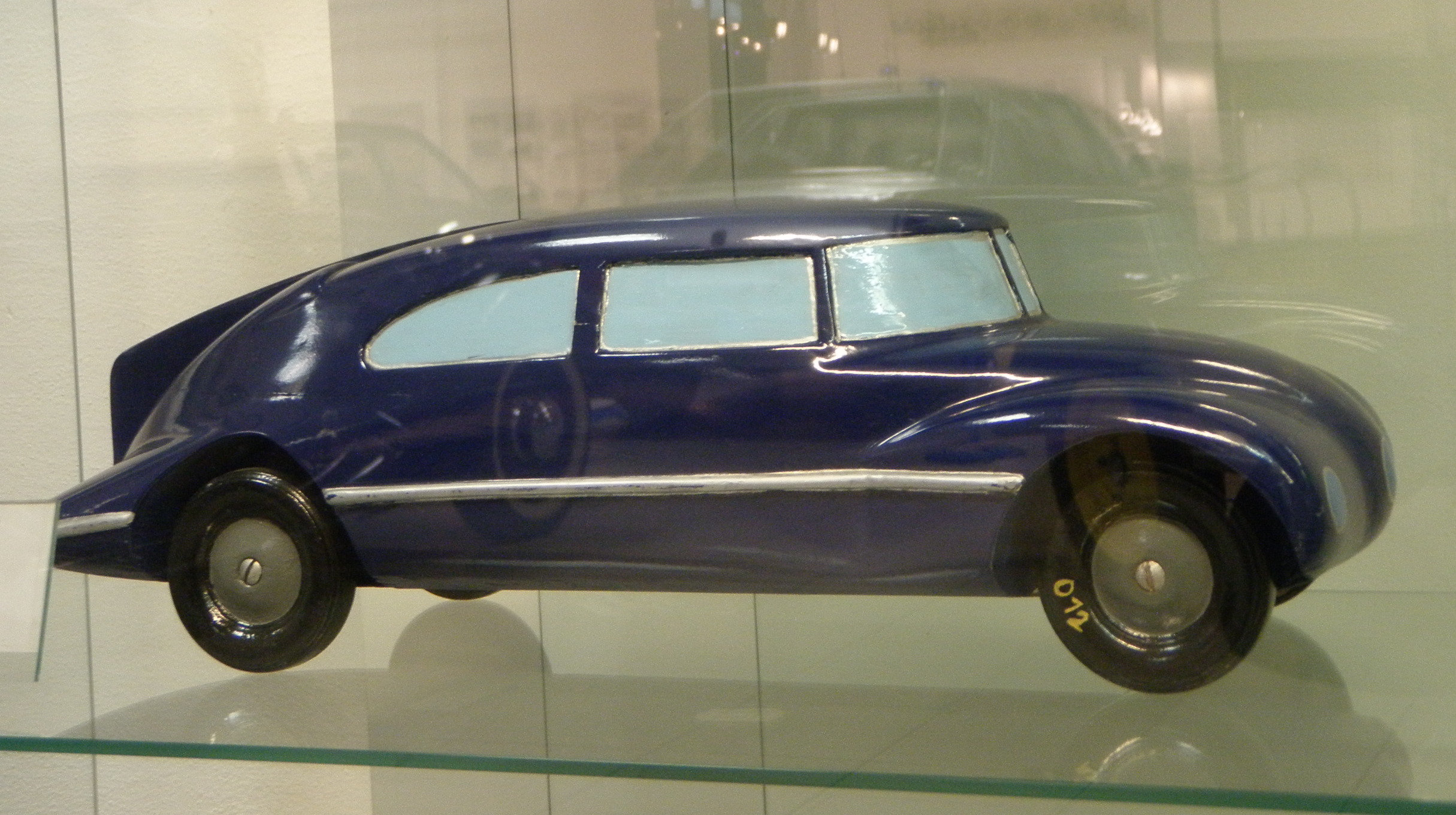
Tatra 77 model 1:10 by Paul Jaray, 1934

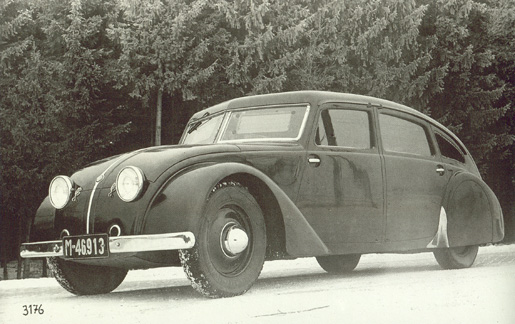
Tatra 77 early prototype, 1934

=== Paul Jaray and Tatra V570 ===
Paul Jaray first worked at Luftschiffbau Zeppelin (LZ) where he gained experience in the aerodynamic design of airships. He used his access to LZ's wind tunnels and subsequently established streamlining principles for car design. In 1927 he founded a company specializing in developing streamlined car bodies and selling issuing licences to major vehicle manufacturers. Tatra was the only manufacturer to incorporate Jaray's streamlining principles into their series car production, starting with the Tatra 77.

Before designing the large, luxurious T77, Jaray designed an aerodynamic body for the Tatra 57, a mid-range model. This prototype was not developed further and failed to reach production. Instead, Jaray constructed two prototypes for a concept designated the Tatra V570, which more closely conformed to his aerodynamic streamlining principles, featuring a beetle-shaped body.

=== Decision to make luxurious state-of-the-art car ===
However, at the time Tatra already had a cheap, strongly-selling car in its production range, which was moreover popular due to its continuation of the tradition of simplicity and ultra-reliability inaugurated by the Tatra 11. Although Tatra management saw the advantages of Jaray's concept, they believed that the new model would make sense only as an additional model with limited production, which meant that it should be aimed at the top of the automobile market. Ledwinka's team subsequently stopped work on the V570 and concentrated on designing large luxury cars. Tatra aimed to make state-of-the-art cars that would be fast, stable, nearly silent, economical and built to the most rigorous engineering standards, as well as reflect modern aerodynamic research.

=== Unique engine ===
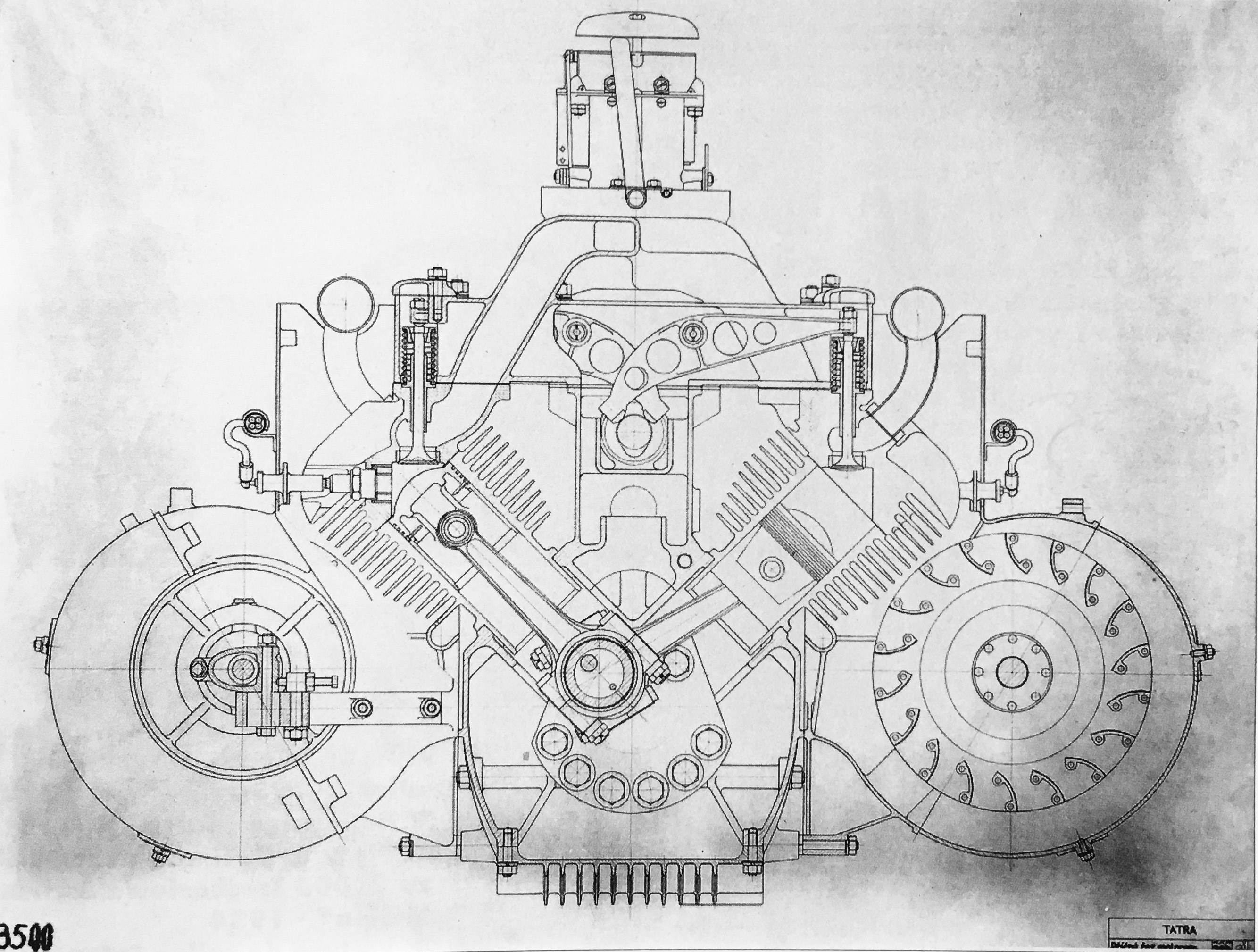
T77 Engine cross-section

The T77/77A cars were quite probably the last production use of the "walking-beam" valvetrain principle, their dry-sump air/oil-cooled V8 engines having overhead valves in hemispherical heads, but no pushrods. Instead the valves are opened by enormous drilled rockers operated by a single high camshaft between the two cylinder banks' heads, and pivoted inboard of their centres to extend the lift applied by the cams. The principle had been used much earlier in the Duesenberg 16-valve straight-4 low-twin-cam racing engine, later adopted by Rochester for use in passenger cars, but Tatra's use of a single camshaft to open the valves of a V8 without pushrods, rather than two low shafts on a straight engine, must be unique. A consequence is that the mechanical layout is much less obvious to the observer, with the big box-shaped engine giving few immediate clues to its V configuration, unlike its T87 OHC successor. Belt-driven squirrel fans in cast alloy ducting draw air forward, up and around the four shrouded pairs of finned iron cylinders, and a large hinged alloy cover maintains a warm environment for the carburettor in winter.

=== Public response ===
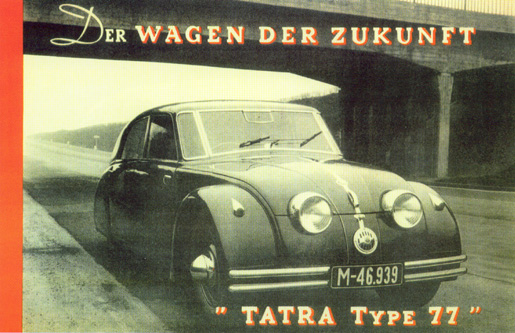
"The car of the future, Tatra 77": contemporary advertisement

Hans Ledwinka was the chief designer responsible for the development of the new car, while Erich Übelacker was responsible for the body. Development was very secretive until the last moments of the official presentation on March 5, 1934, at Tatra's offices in Prague. The car was demonstrated on the road from Prague to Karlovy Vary, where it easily reached 145 kilometres per hour (90 mph), and amazed journalists with its great handling and comfortable ride at speeds of about 100 kilometres per hour (60 mph). On March 8, the Tatra was presented at Berlin motor show, where it became the centre of attention due not only to its atypical design but also to its performance. That same year the T77 was presented at the Paris motor show. There were even demonstration rides after doubt was cast on the ability of the car to reach 140 kilometres per hour (87 mph) with a mere 45 kilowatts (60 hp) of engine power: normally at that time twice the power was required for a car to reach such a speed. Director Maurice Elvey was so amazed by the looks of the car that he used the T77 in his science-fiction movie The Transatlantic Tunnel.

The Tatra 77 was an expensive luxury car – a price was 98,000 koruns (equal to some US$4,000 in 1935).

It is a sensation when it comes to its construction, to its appearance and to its performance. However, it isn't a sensation that has just fallen from the skies, but is a logical extension of roads [themselves], which Hans Ledwinka made thirteen years ago. The ideological principle of the new Tatra is an understanding that the car is moving along the dividing line between the ground and the air. ... The car maintained 145km/h, it has astonishing handling, it drives through curves with speeds that are both mad and safe, and it seems just to float on any kind of road. ... It is a car which opens new perspectives to car construction and automotive practice.

— Vilém Heinz, Motor Journal, 1934

That is the car for my highways!

— Adolf Hitler to Ferdinand Porsche

=== Notable owners ===
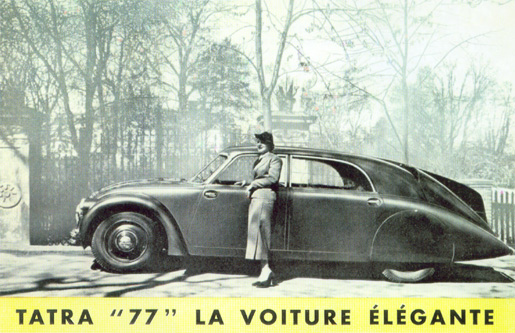
"Tatra 77, the elegant car": contemporary advertisement

The Tatra 77 was the particular favourite of Tatra design engineer Erich Übelacker, who owned and used a T77 himself from 1934. Other famous owners of T77s were Miloš Havel, the proprietor of the film studios in Prague, who bought a T77 in 1935, Austrian car designer Edmund Rumpler, who designed the aerodynamic Rumpler Tropfenwagen in 1921, Edvard Beneš, the 1930s minister of Foreign Affairs and later president of Czechoslovakia, who both owned a T77a.

== Design ==
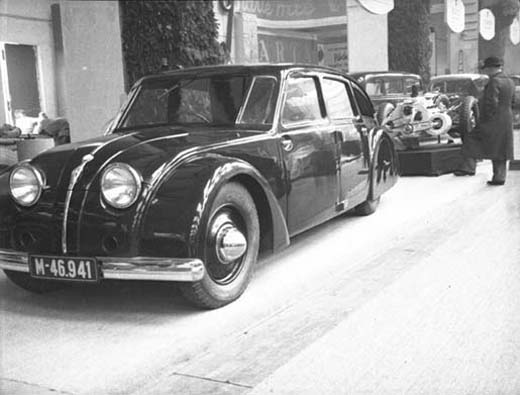
The Tatra 77 and its engine displayed at the Berlin Motor Show

A number of designers around the world were trying to construct an aerodynamic car at the time, but Tatra was the first one to successfully introduce it into serial production. There were numerous reasons why Tatra designers took such a revolutionary approach to the conception of the new car: First of all it was their aim to reduce drag, mostly air-drag, which increases with the square of the speed. A car with a more standard body shape of the era needed a very powerful engine to reach higher speeds. The Tatra's new body shape was tested in a wind tunnel. However, the new requirements this brought about resulted in far-reaching changes to the car's design.

The requirement of a small front face area limited the car's height, which in turn required the use of a flat floor. That led to putting the engine in the rear of the car, directly above the driven axle. Subsequently there was no need for a floor tunnel with a drive shaft and exhaust pipes, which contributed to a reduction in weight. As the designers wanted to reduce the rolling resistance, they did their best to produce an engine as light as possible: an air-cooled V8 with a crank case made from elektron, a magnesium alloy. The gearbox was also made from elektron, and it was positioned in front of the engine and rear axle.

The rear position of the engine was favourable for air cooling, while the oil cooler, battery and spare wheel were positioned in the front of the car. The frameless body was characterized by its central structural member, which was firmly welded to the floor panels and which covered the linkage to the brakes, gearbox, etc.

The front of the car had a basically rectangular cross section and was rounded all the way to the floor. The front bumper covered the rounded fenders, while the lower halves of the lights were embedded in the bonnet. The rear of the car had a continuously sloping form and was divided by a vertical fin which started at the rear end of the roof and ended almost at the rear end of the car. The rear wheels had aerodynamic covers. The door handles were embedded into the door panels, from which only the door hinges protruded slightly. The car had no rear window, limiting rear visibility to what could be discerned through slits in the sheet metal.

The first prototype of 1933 had a split windscreen, while other prototypes had a single-piece windscreen or even one formed from three separate pieces of glass with one large central piece and two side parts angled sharply and flowing into the sides of the body.

Air was directed to the engine by rectangular ventilation inlets behind the side windows, and exited the engine compartment through vents at the rear. At the time, Tatra registered numerous patents regarding air flow to the rear engine compartment.

Later the rear part of the body was widened so that both the rear fenders and door hinges were embedded into the bodywork itself. The air now flowed through transverse inlets which were raised above the rear of the rounded roof. The trailing edge was also raised.

=== Tatra 77a ===
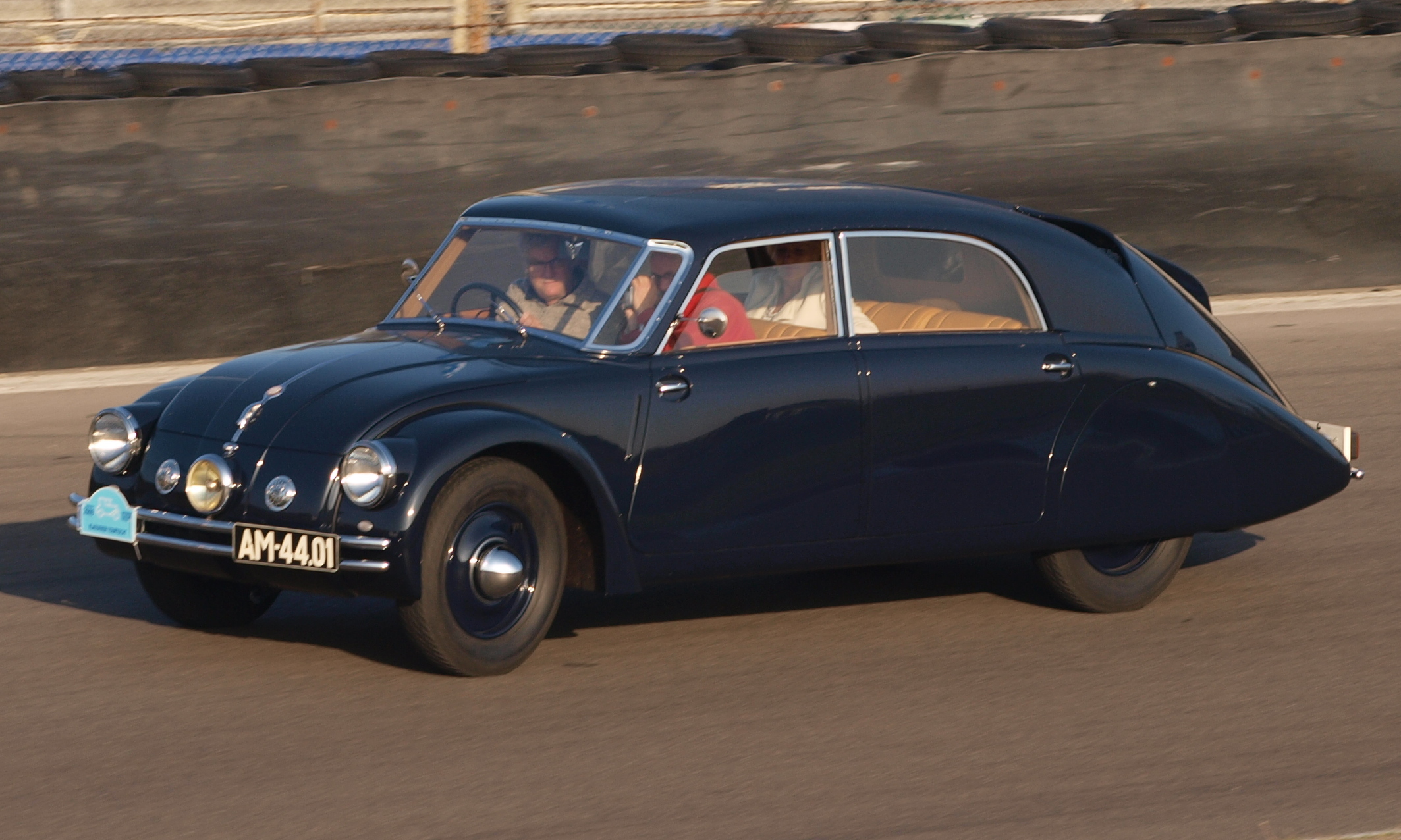
Tatra 77a at the Circuit Park Zandvoort in the Netherlands

In 1935 the T77 was updated and improved, which resulted in the T77a. The capacity of the V8 was increased to 3.4 L (207 cubic inches). This was achieved by enlarging the bore diameter from 75 to 80 mm (3.0 to 3.1 inches). The new motor increased output to 75 hp (56 kW) and maximum speed to 150 km/h (93 mph). The front now had three headlamps of which the central unit was not, as has been suggested, linked to the steering on some models. The central headlight never moved with the front wheels, but had an electro-magnetic system enabling the reflector to move to illuminate the kerbs, as street illumination was poor at the time. Some T77s and T77a models were also equipped with canvas Webasto roofs. The smooth body of the T77a gave a coefficient of aerodynamic drag of 0.212. Some sources, though, claim that this figure was based on a 1:10 scale-model test, and it has been confirmed recently that the drag coefficient for the real full-size car is 0.36.

=== Versions ===
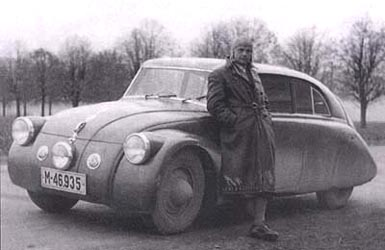
Erich Übelacker in front of the prototype T77a, a two-door coupé with a T87 engine

The Tatra 77 was a hand-built car with a leather interior. Some cars had a glass partition between the front and rear seats. A sliding roof was available.

An unusual feature on a few of the T77 models was a central position for the steering wheel in the dashboard. The front-seat passengers were seated on either side of the driver and the seats placed slightly rearwards as in the modern-day McLaren F1. All other T77's had the steering wheel on the right-hand side as Czechoslovakia (like a number of other European countries) drove on the left before the Second World War.

The unique car pictured here is the two-door coupé prototype used by Erich Übelacker. This one also had the more powerful engine from the later Tatra 87.

=== Further development ===
Ledwinka was not entirely satisfied with the T77's handling, which was hampered by the car's rather heavy rear. He started work on a successor to the T77, which was to be lighter and have improved weight distribution. Tatra achieved that with the Tatra 87 that was introduced in 1936.

== In culture ==
A Tatra 77 features in the 1935 film The Tunnel at 17:23, and again at 58:30.

A 1936 Tatra 77 was shown at the Victoria & Albert Museum in London from November 2019 to April 2020 included in their exhibition "Cars: Accelerating the Modern World".

== See also ==
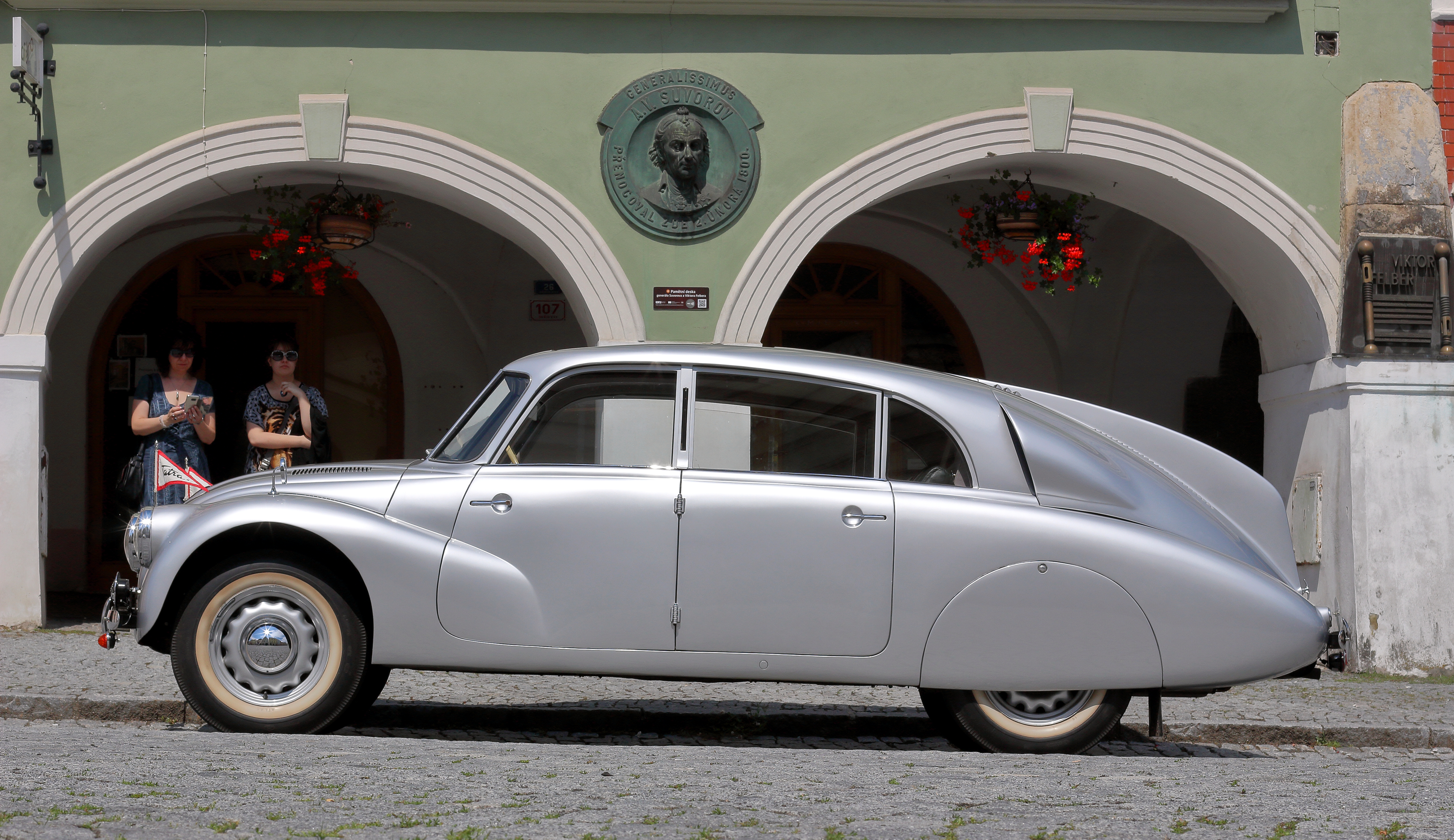

Streamlined Tatras

- Tatra V570 1931, 1933
- Tatra 77 1933–1938
- Tatra 87 1936–1950
- Tatra 97 1936–1939
- Tatra 600 Tatraplan 1946–1952
- Tatra 603 1956–1975
- Tatra (car)
- Streamliner: Automobiles - for overview of early aerodynamic cars

Early aerodynamic cars, chronologically

- Rumpler Tropfenwagen (1921), first aerodynamic "teardrop" car to be designed and serially produced (about 100 units built)
- Persu car (1922–23), designed by Romanian engineer Aurel Persu, improved on the Tropfenwagen by placing the wheels inside the car body
- Burney cars (1929–1931), working prototypes designed by Dennis Burney and manufactured by Streamline Cars
- Dymaxion car (1933), US "teardrop" car
- Stout Scarab (1932–1935), US "teardrop" car
- Pierce Silver Arrow (1933), US streamline car
- Chrysler Airflow (1934–1937), US streamline car
- Schlörwagen (1939), German prototype "teardrop" car, never produced

== Literature ==
Margolius, Ivan & Henry, John G., Tatra - The Legacy of Hans Ledwinka, Veloce Publishing, Dorchester 2015, ISBN 978-1-845847-99-9 & ISBN 978-1-787116-30-6
