= Tatra 97 =

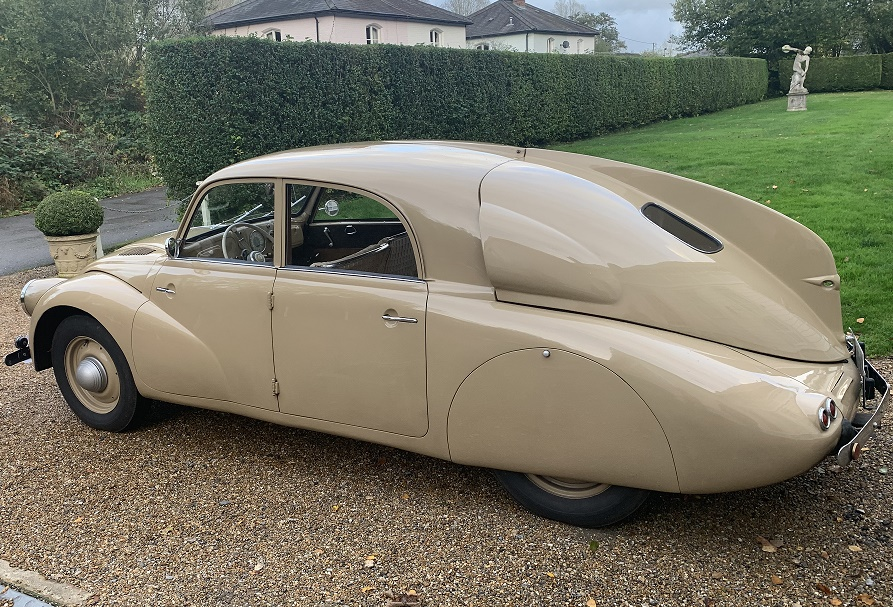
- 1938 Tatra 97 at Petworth railway station, West Sussex, November 2022

Overview
- Manufacturer: Tatra
- Production: 1936–1939; 508 produced
- Designer: Hans Ledwinka, Erich Ledwinka, Erich Übelacker

Body and chassis
- Class: Compact to mid-size car
- Body style: Fastback sedan
- Layout: RR layout

Powertrain
- Engine: 1.8L Tatra 97 F4
- Transmission: 4-speed manual

Dimensions
- Wheelbase: 2,600 mm (102.4 in)
- Length: 4,270 mm (168.1 in)
- Width: 1,610 mm (63.4 in)
- Height: 1,450 mm (57.1 in)
- Curb weight: 1,150 kg (2,540 lb)

Chronology
- Predecessor: Tatra 75
- Successor: Tatra 600

The Tatra 97 (T97) is a Czechoslovak mid-size car built by Tatra in Kopřivnice, Moravia, from 1936 to 1939.

== History ==
The Tatra 97 was designed to complement two full-size cars in the Tatra range: the Tatra 77 launched in 1934 and the Tatra 87 launched in 1936 along with the Type 97. Each of the three models has an air-cooled rear engine and share similar aerodynamic fastback four-door sedan bodies. But whereas types 77 and 87 each have a large V8 engine, Type 97 has a flat-four engine. The Type 97 is distinguished by having two headlights and a one-piece windscreen, whereas the 77 and 87 have three headlights and a three-piece windscreen. The Type 97's flat-four engine displaces 1,759 cc and produces 40 horsepower (30 kW), giving it a top speed of 130 km/h (81 mph).

Tatra already had a mid-size car in the same class, the more conventional 1,688 cc Tatra 75 that it had launched in 1933. Tatra continued to produce the Type 75 alongside the futuristic Type 97. In fact production of the Type 75 outlived that of the Type 97 and continued until 1942.

Kopřivnice is in a part of northern Moravia that Nazi Germany annexed after the Munich Agreement in September 1938. Production of the Type 97 was terminated in 1939, possibly to avoid comparison with the KdF-Wagen (see below). Production of the Type 97 was 508 cars in total. In 1946 Tatra resumed car production, and replaced the Type 97 with the larger and more modern Tatra 600 "Tatraplan".

== Resemblance to Volkswagen KdF-Wagen ==
According to some authors, in both streamlined design and technical specifications, especially the engine design and position, the Type 97 has a striking resemblance to Volkswagen's KdF-Wagen. However Tatra 97 itself does not appear original, as it has resemblance to sketches by Hungarian engineer Bela Barenyi, conceived in the 1920s and published in 1934. In any case Adolf Hitler is reported to have encountered and said of Tatra's cars; "This is the car for my roads". Ferdinand Porsche was accused of using Tatra designs to design the Volkswagen quickly and cheaply. In Porsche's words; "Well, sometimes Ledwinka looked over my shoulder and sometimes I looked over his".

Tatra sued Porsche for damages, and Porsche was willing to settle. But Hitler cancelled this, saying he "would settle the matter". Soon after Germany occupied the Sudetenland, Tatra stopped production of the Type 97 and the lawsuit was discontinued. After the Second World War Tatra resumed its lawsuit. In 1965 Volkswagen settled it by paying Tatra DM 1,000,000 in compensation.

== Gallery (selected) ==
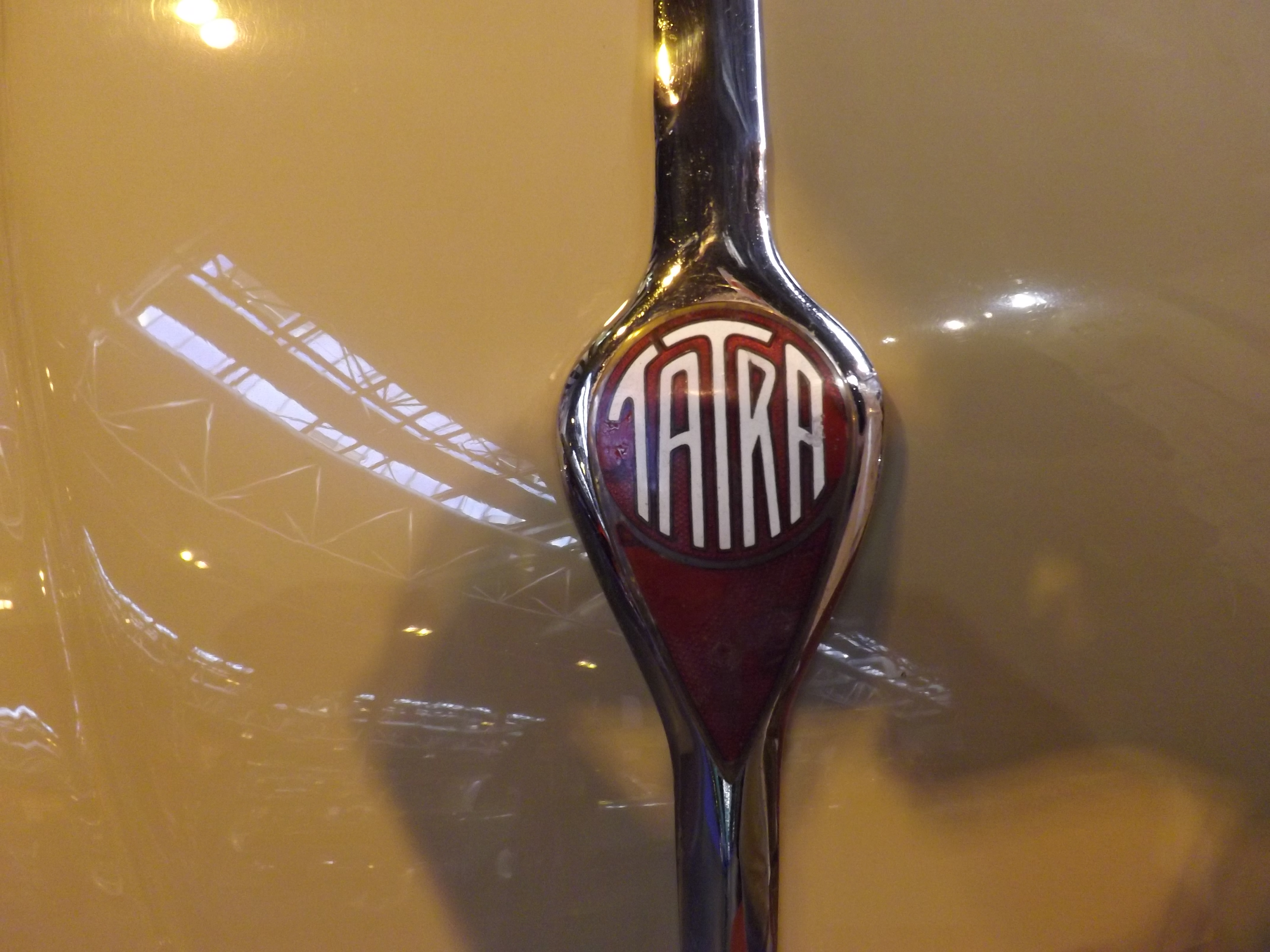
Company badge

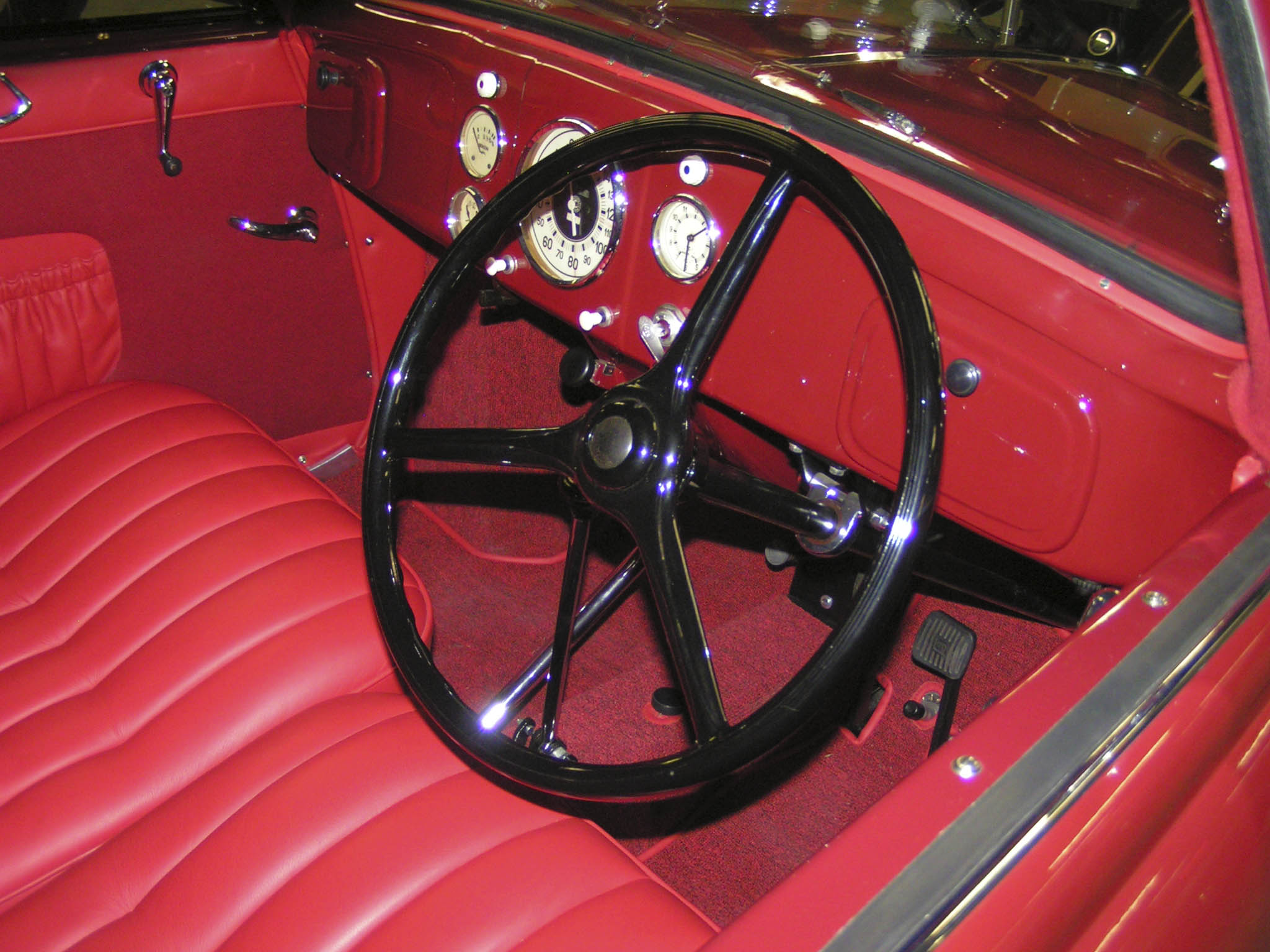
Tatra 97 interior

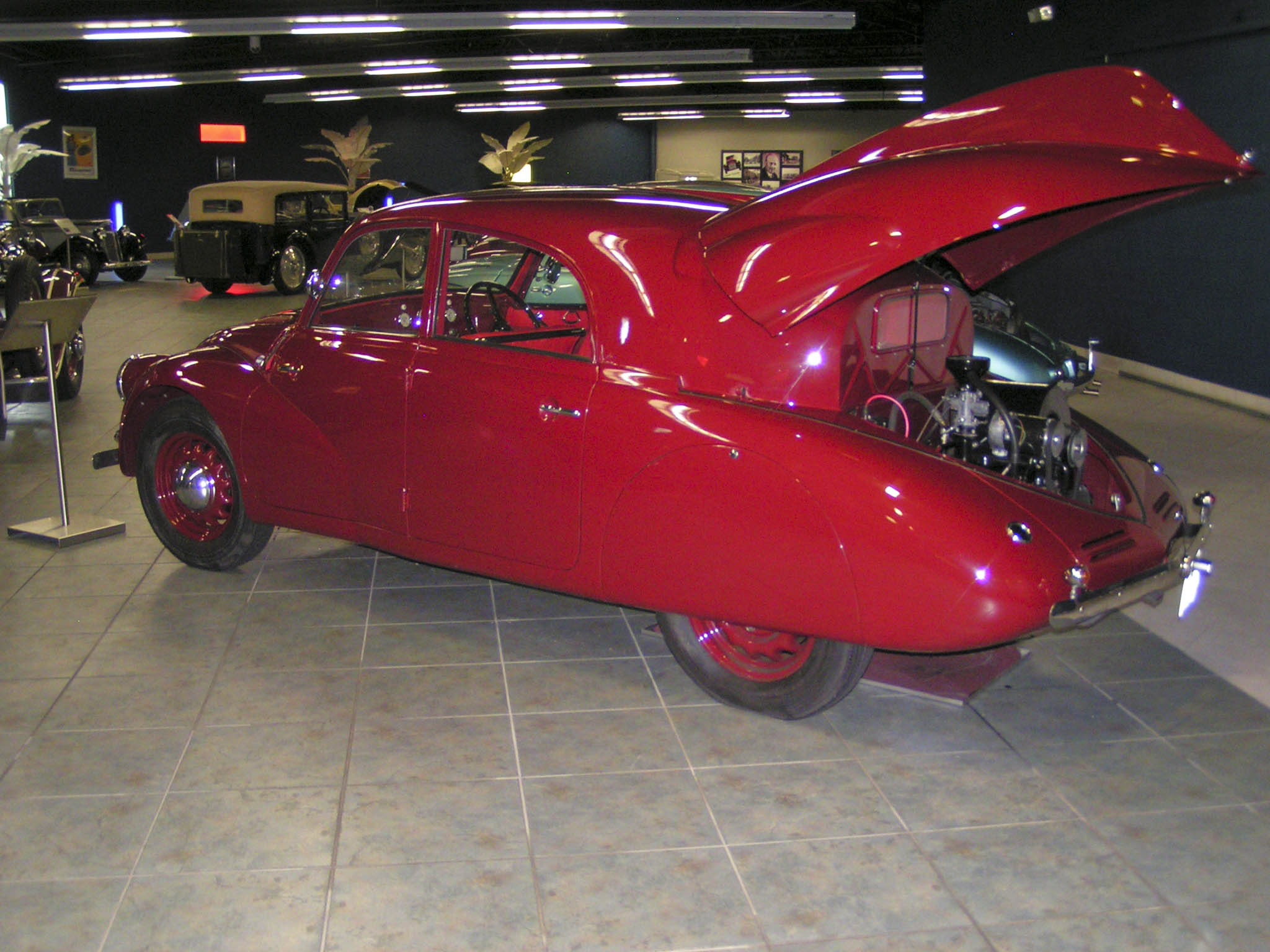
Tatra 97 rear quarter view

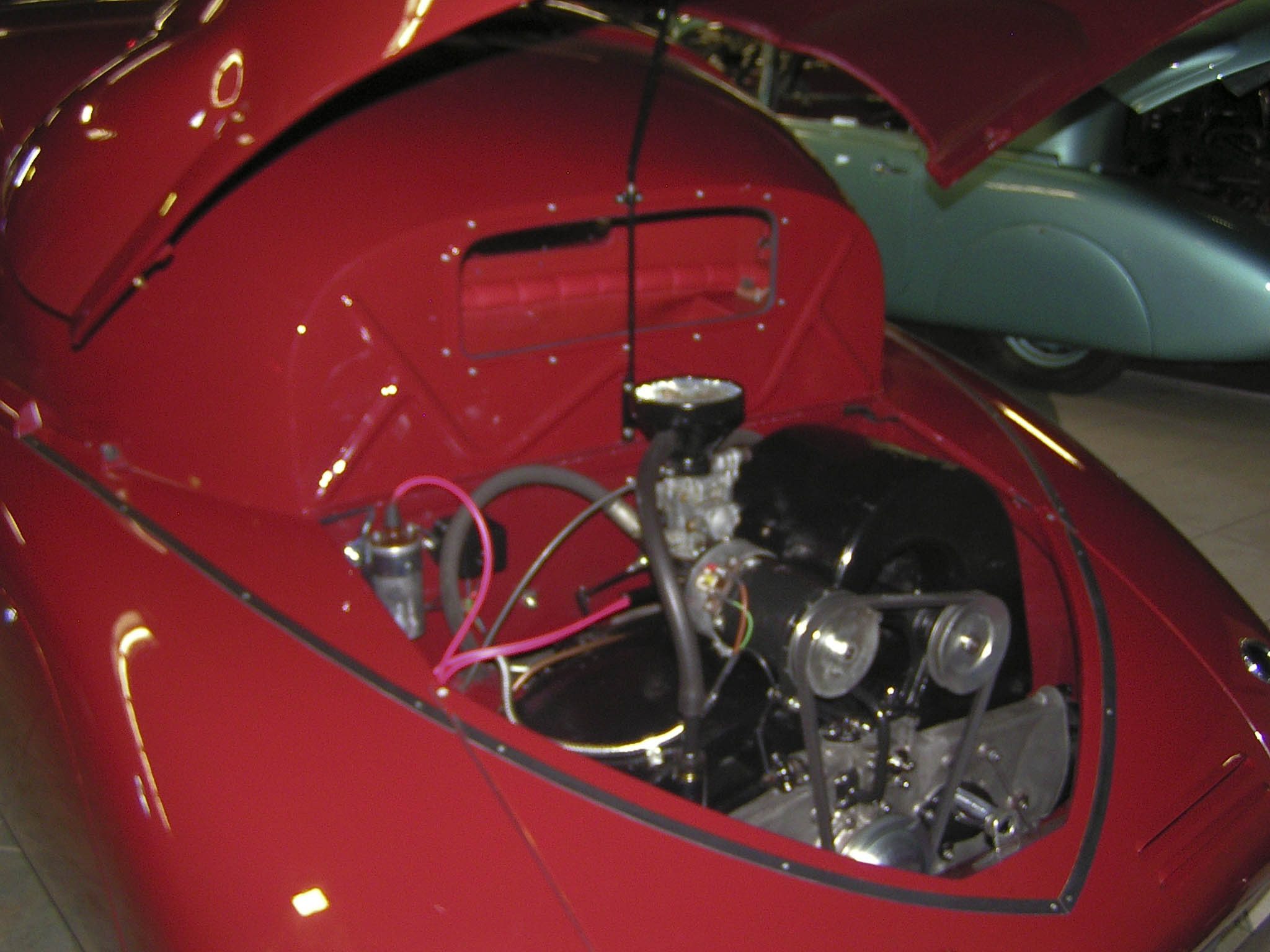
Air-cooled, rear-mounted flat-four engine

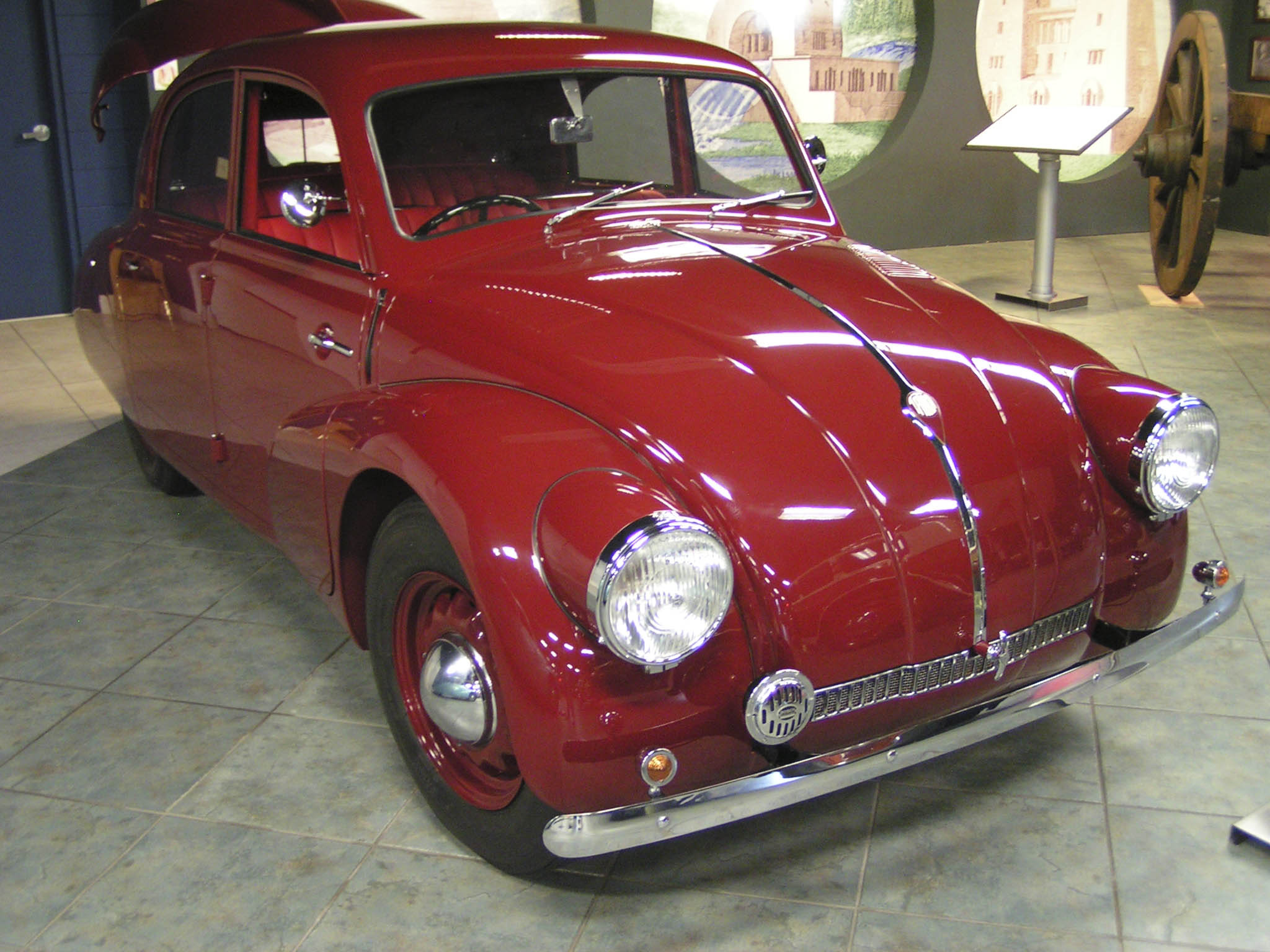
Tatra 97 front

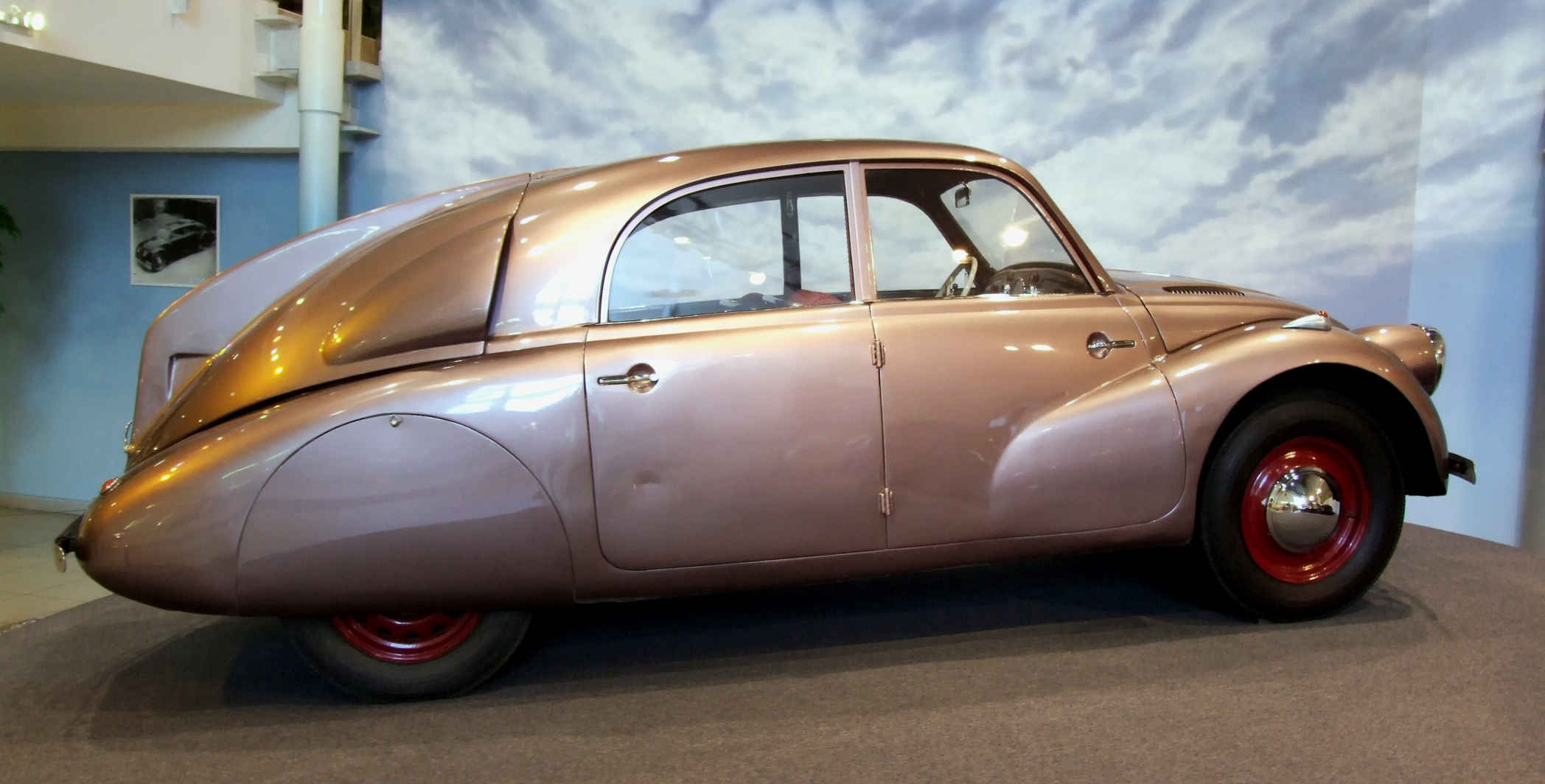
Type 97 in the Tatra museum at Kopřivnice

== Bibliography ==
- Mantle, Jonathan (1995). Car Wars: Fifty Years of Greed, Treachery and Skulduggery in the Global Marketplace. New York: Arcade Publishing. ISBN 1-55970-333-4.
- Margolius, Ivan; Henry, John G (2015). Tatra – The Legacy of Hans Ledwinka. Poundbury: Veloce Publishing Ltd. ISBN 978-1-845847-99-9.
- Schmarbeck, Wolfgang (1997). Hans Ledwinka: Seine Autos Sein Leben (in German). Graz: H Weishaupt Verlag. p. 174. ISBN 3-900310-56-4.
- Tuček, Jan (2017). Auta první republiky 1918–1938 (in Czech). Prague: Grada Publishing. pp. 294–295. ISBN 978-80-271-0466-6.
