= Erich Übelacker =

German automobile designer

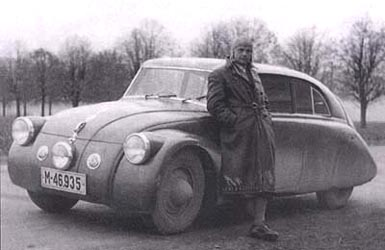
Erich Übelacker with Tatra 77a coupe, 1935

Erich Übelacker (19 October 1899 Vienna – 30 June 1977 Bremen) was a German automobile engineer.

Übelacker studied mechanical engineering at Prague Technical University and subsequently worked there as an assistant to Professor Rudolf Dörfl. During 1927–39 he worked at Tatra Works in Kopřivnice in Moravia under the leadership of Hans Ledwinka. Together with Ledwinka's son Erich Ledwinka, Übelacker developed the Tatra type 57 and designed the first Tatra aerodynamic cars with air-cooled rear engines T77, T77a, T87 and T97. During 1939–41 he worked for Austrian automobile factory Steyr, subsequently moving to Daimler-Benz in Stuttgart constructing turbine engines there between 1941 and 1945. As a captured soldier he continued the work on turbine engines at Turbomeca in Pau, France. From 1949 to 1961 he was employed as chief designer of utility and special automobiles at Borgward in Bremen, Germany. He was an author of large number of technical patents relating to automobile design.

== See also ==
- List of automobile manufacturers
- Hans Ledwinka

== Sources ==
- Margolius, Ivan; Henry, John G. (1990). Tatra – The Legacy of Hans Ledwinka. Harrow: SAF. ISBN 0-946719-06-3.
- Margolius, Ivan; Henry, John G. (2015). Tatra – The Legacy of Hans Ledwinka. Dorchester: Veloce. ISBN 978-1-845847-99-9.
