= Hans Ledwinka =

Austrian automotive designer

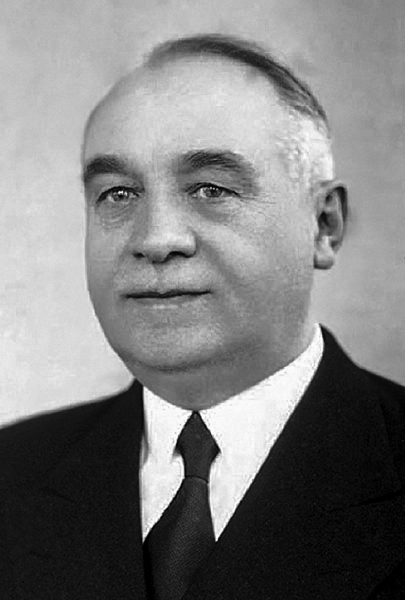
- Ledwinka in 1942
- Born: 14 February 1878; Klosterneuburg, Austro-Hungarian Empire
- Died: 2 March 1967 (aged 89); Munich, West Germany
- Children: de:Erich Ledwinka, de:Fritz Ledwinka
- Engineering career
- Projects: Tatra 11, Tatra 77, Tatra 87, Tatra 97, Tatra 111
- Significant design: Backbone chassis, air-cooled engines, swing-axles

Hans Ledwinka (14 February 1878 – 2 March 1967) was an Austrian automotive designer.

== Early life ==
Ledwinka was born in Klosterneuburg (Lower Austria), near Vienna, then part of the Austro-Hungarian Empire. Ledwinka's father hailed from Brtnice (Pirnitz), a Czech town near Jihlava (Iglau) that historically had a large German-speaking population. His mother was from Dobersberg, an Austrian village about 59 km (37 mi) away near the Czech border.

He began his career as a mechanic and later pursued further studies in Vienna. As a young man, he worked for Nesselsdorfer-Wagenbau in Kopřivnice, then known as Nesselsdorf, in the Sudetenland, the border area of Czech Silesia with a large ethnic German population. The company later became Tatra.

He initially worked in the construction of railroad cars and was later involved in the production of the first passenger cars made by this firm. Among others, he designed the 5.3-litre, six-cylinder Type U motor car. In May 1916, during World War I, he accepted directorship at Steyr near Linz, initially commuting between Nesselsdorf and Steyr before moving there permanently in 1917.

== Chief designer at Tatra ==
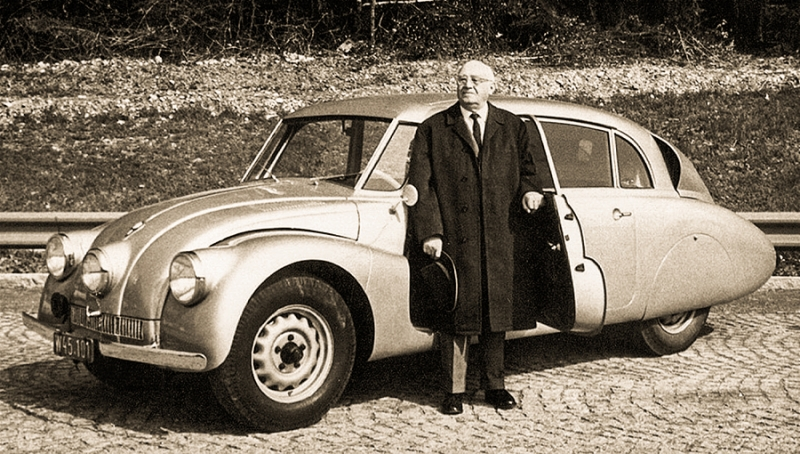
Hans Ledwinka in front of a Tatra T87

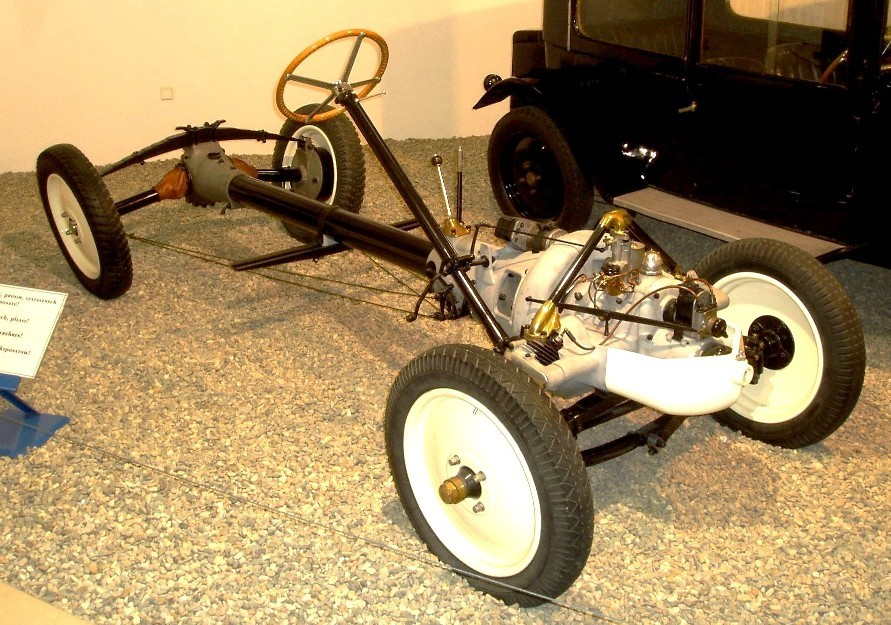
Backbone chassis, developed by Hans Ledwinka in 1923 for Tatra. The company uses the concept to this day.

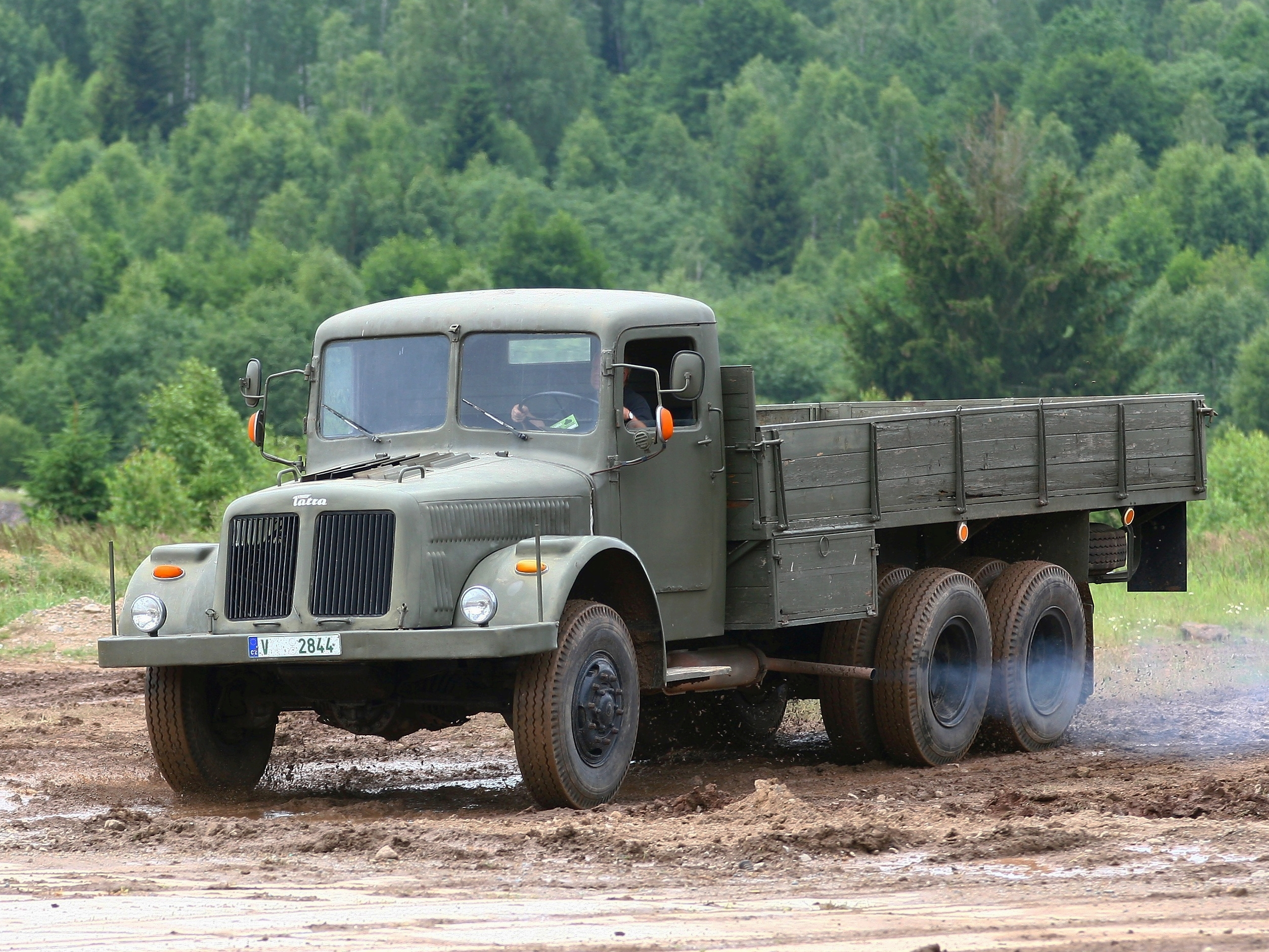
Tatra 111, designed for the Wehrmacht by Hans Ledwinka

After the war, in 1921, Ledwinka returned to Nesselsdorfer-Wagenbau, which had been renamed cs:Kopřivnická vozovka, to run their passenger car division. Although the company started using the brand name Tatra for its vehicles as early as 1919, the company name did not reflect that until 1927.

Owing to the breakup of the Austro-Hungarian Empire, the company was now located in Czechoslovakia. Ledwinka remained an Austrian after the breakup of the monarchy. Although he spent the majority of his career in Czechoslovakia, he never managed to learn Czech and communicated in German.

Between 1921 and 1937, he served as the company's chief design engineer. Among others, he invented the frameless central tubular chassis (so-called "backbone chassis") with swing axles, fully independent suspension, and rear-mounted air-cooled flat engine. That led to several successful vehicle designs, starting with the Tatra T11. The concept has proven particularly useful for heavy-duty trucks, such as the Tatra 111, and the company continues to benefit from his invention to the present day.

Another one of his significant contributions to automotive design was the streamlined car body. Under him, Tatra brought the first mass-produced streamlined cars to the market. With his son Erich, who became chief designer at Tatra, Ledwinka and Erich Übelacker, a German engineer also employed by Tatra, designed the streamlined Tatra models T77, T77a, T87, and T97, all of which have rear-mounted air-cooled engines.

== Later years ==
In 1945, after World War II, Ledwinka was accused of collaboration with Nazi Germany, imprisoned, and eventually sentenced to six years of incarceration in 1948. He was allowed to leave prison a few months early due to his age and declining health. After his release in 1951, Ledwinka refused to continue to work for Tatra and first moved to Vienna, then Munich, where he died in 1967. Hans Ledwinka was posthumously exonerated by the Czechoslovak Supreme Court in 1992.

== Legacy ==
Along with Ferdinand Porsche and Siegfried Marcus, Hans Ledwinka is considered one of Austria's most significant automotive pioneers. In 2007, Ledwinka was inducted into the nl:European Automotive Hall of Fame.

Ledwinka's son Erich was also a car designer. He designed the unique Haflinger, a small, high-mobility vehicle, for Steyr-Daimler-Puch, as well as the larger Pinzgauer. Both use tubular chassis and swing portal axles pioneered by his father.

== See also ==
- Joseph Ledwinka
- Tatra
