= Paul Jaray =

Austrian automotive engineer

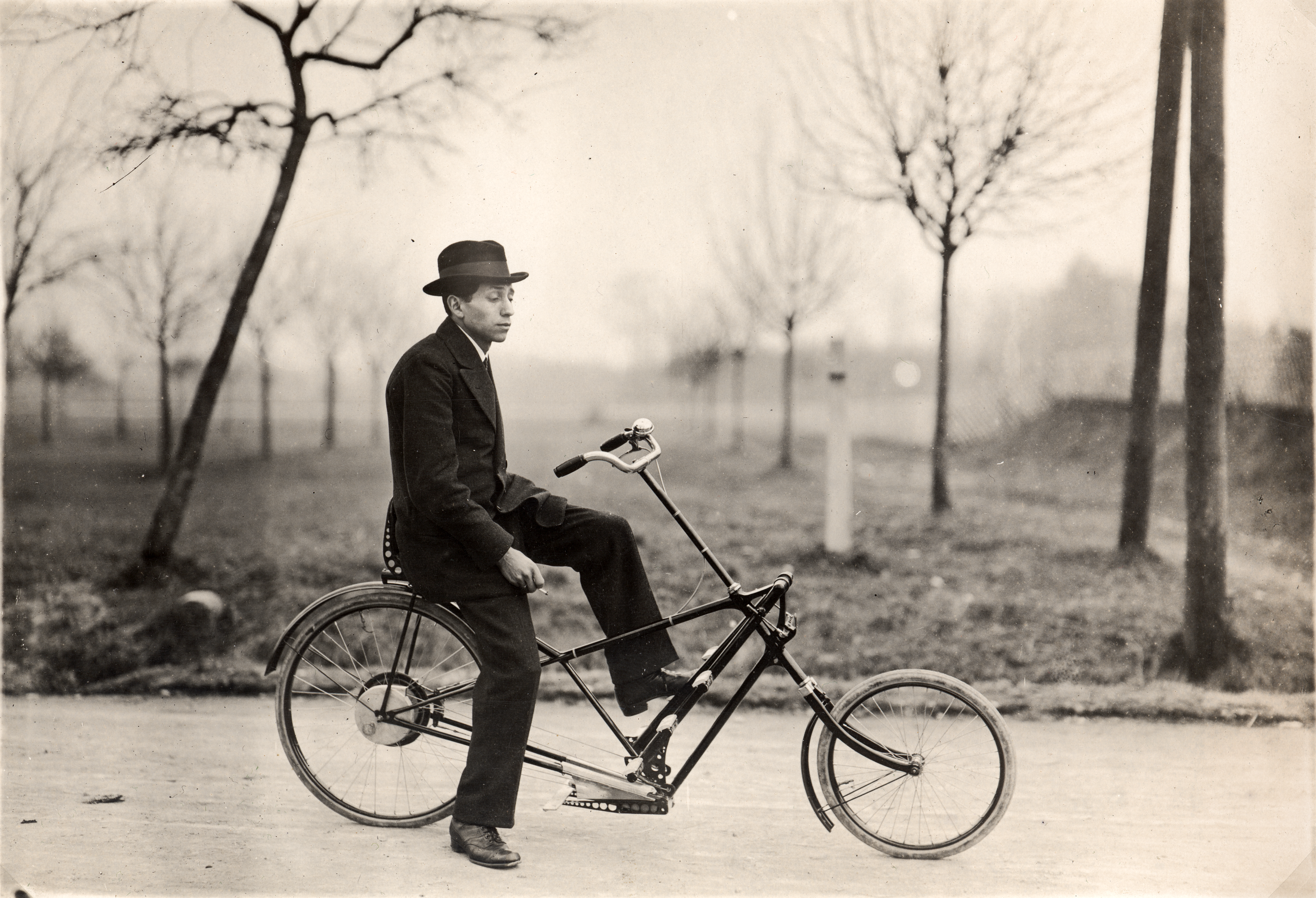
Jaray on his own designed J-Rad bicycle c.1921

Paul Jaray (Hungarian: Járay Pál; 11 March 1889 – 22 September 1974) was a Vienna-born engineer, designer, and a pioneer of automotive streamlining.

== Life ==
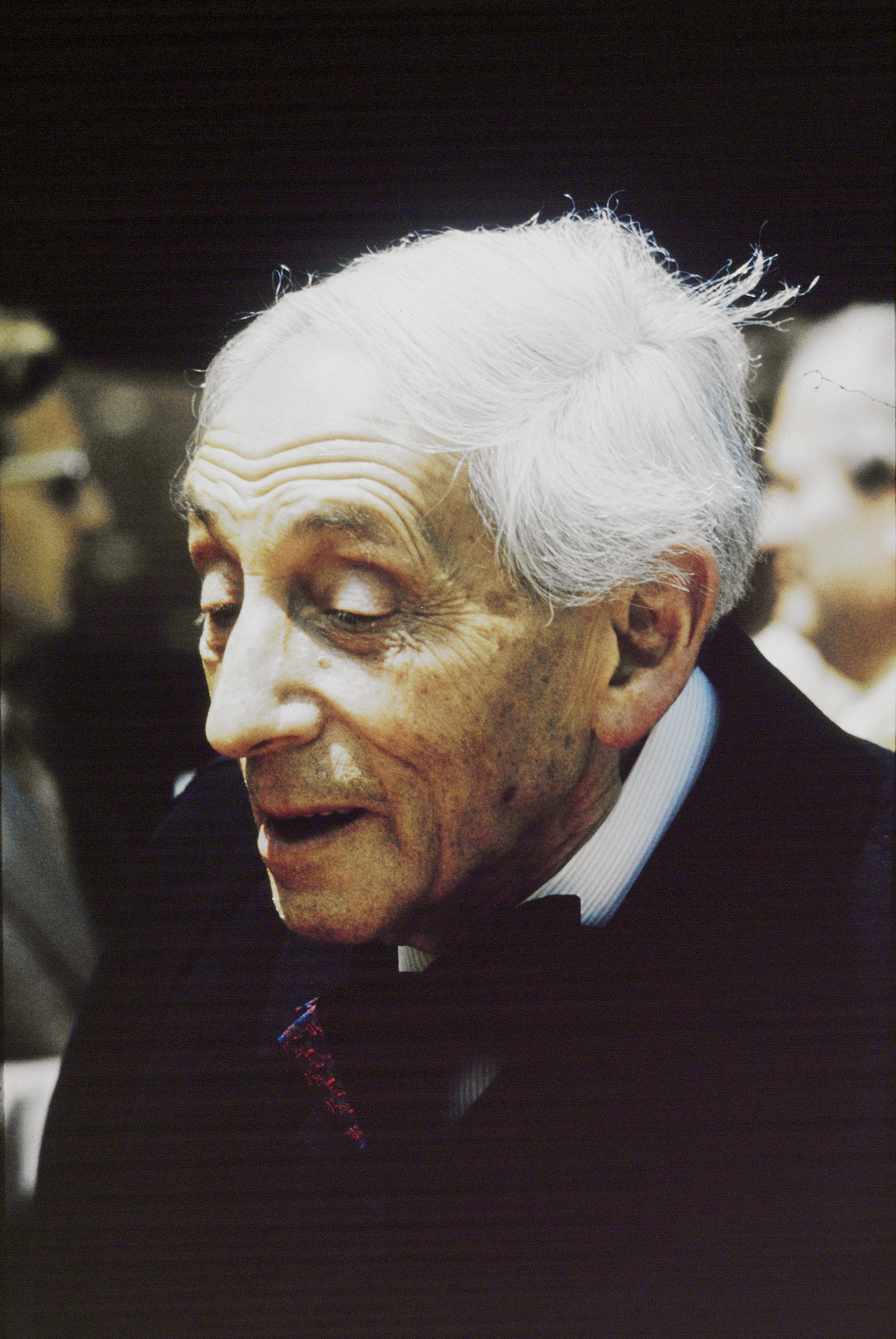
Jaray c. 1960-1974

Paul Jaray came from one of the oldest Prague-born Jewish families of scholars and artists called the Jeitteles, later his family moving to the Hungarian part of the Austro-Hungarian Empire. Jaray, of Hungarian-Jewish descent, was born in Vienna. Jaray studied at Maschinenbauschule in Vienna and worked at the Prague Technical University as an assistant to Professor Rudolf Dörfl.

Later he became the chief design engineer for the aircraft building firm Flugzeugbau Friedrichshafen, designing seaplanes. From 1914 Jaray worked at Luftschiffbau Zeppelin, located in the same town, concentrating on streamlining airships. Jaray designed the airship LZ 120 Bodensee on which airships such as the LZ 127 Graf Zeppelin, the LZ 129 Hindenburg and the LZ-130 were later based. Further experiments in LZ's wind tunnel led to his establishment of streamlining principles for car designs. In 1923 he moved permanently to Switzerland, opening an office in Brunnen.

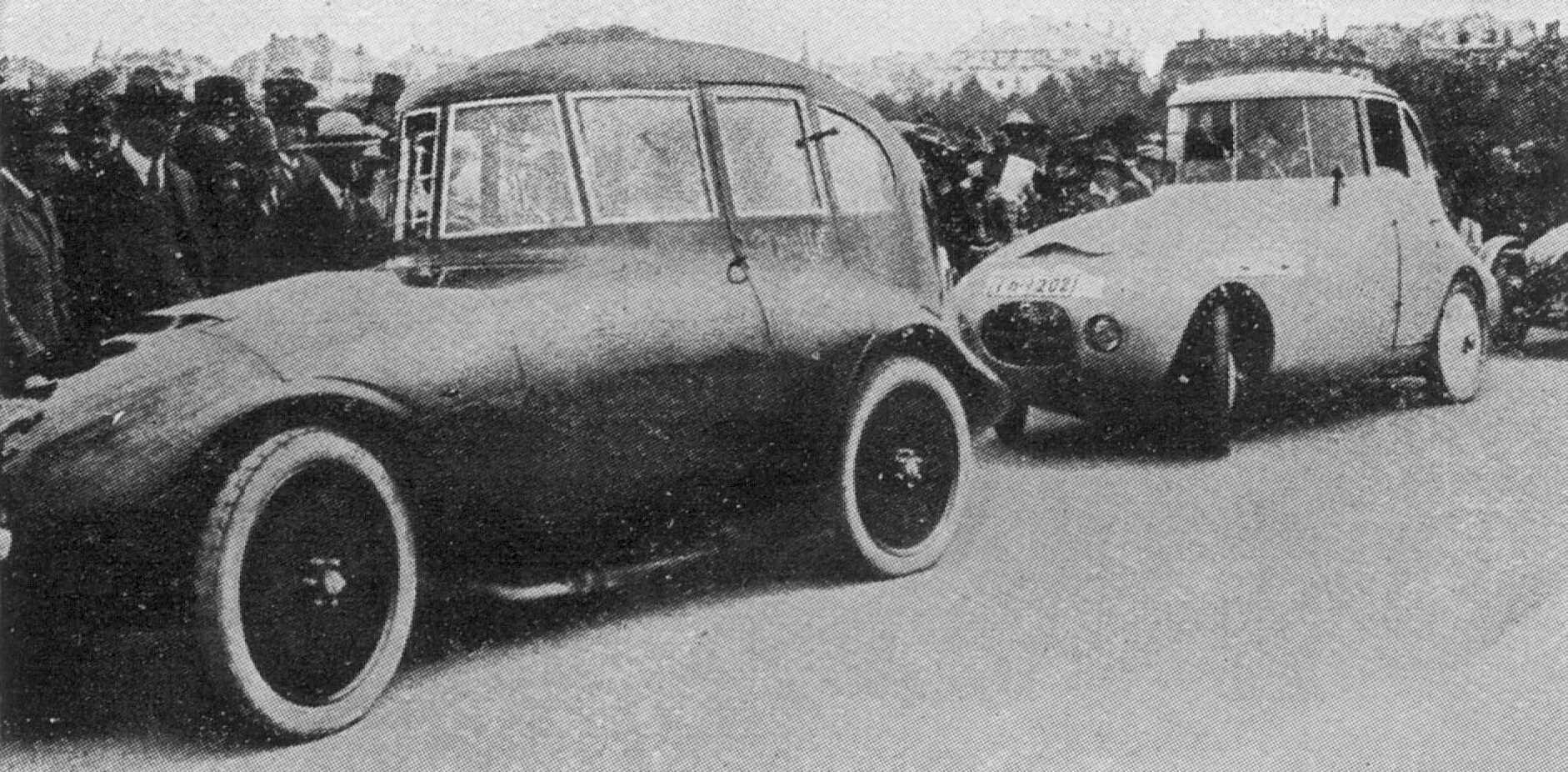
Jaray-designed Apollo and Dixi cars at Automobile Parade, Munich 12 July 1925

In 1922 Jaray designed his first streamlined car, the Ley T6. In 1923 he founded the Stromlinien Karosserie Gesellschaft, which presented numerous designs for streamlined car body work, including for Audi, Apollo, Dixi, Adler, Chrysler, Mercedes-Benz, Maybach, Jawa, Ford, Steyr and others. These looked similar to one another (because Jaray's design was based on aerodynamics).

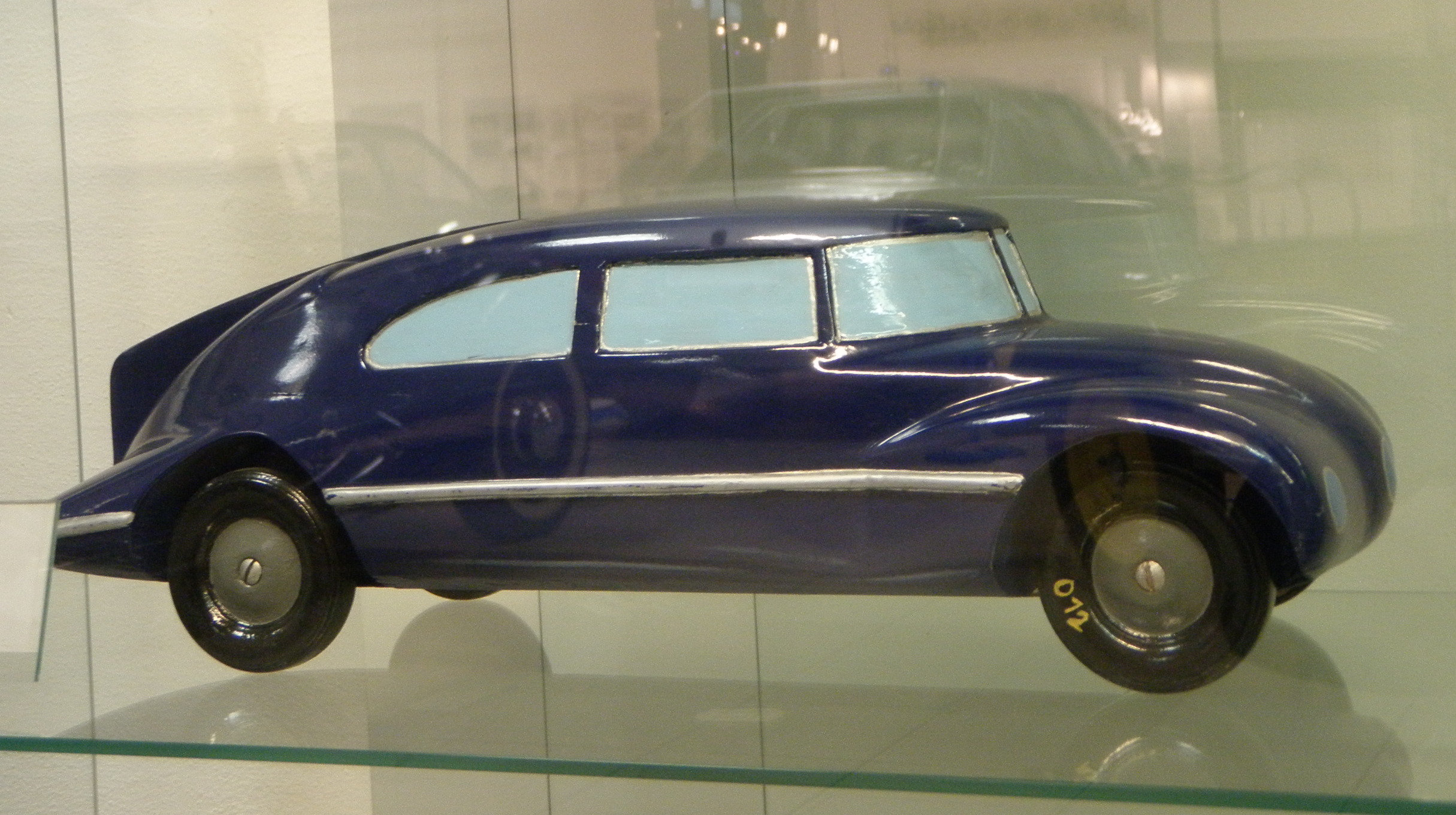
Tatra T77 maquette by Paul Jaray, 1934

Few got beyond prototypes. These were produced with one-off bodywork by coach-builders on a manufacturer's chassis. Jawa built two "factory specials" in 1934 - 35, one of which was entered in the Czech Mille Miglia and won its class. Tatra in Czechoslovakia was the only manufacturer that used Jaray's streamlining principles on series production with the Tatra T77.

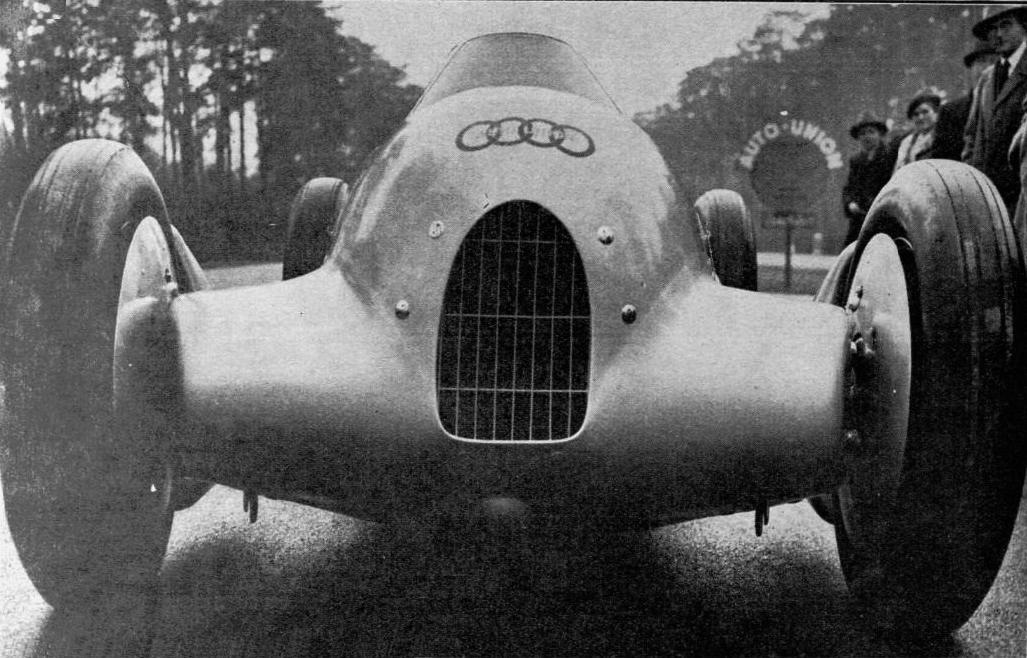
Auto Union Type B with body design by Jaray, 1934

His own 1934 car was built on an Audi 2-litre Front chassis with a body by Huber and Brühwiler of Lucerne. Jaray also designed the body for the streamlined Auto Union Typ B Lucca Rennlimousine in 1934. Jaray was also interested in radio and television technology. In 1941 he worked for Farner AG in Grenchen on nosewheel undercarriage design. In 1944 he set up as an independent engineer working on wind-driven power station. He was the author of a large number of technical patents relating to streamlining, air compressors for railway, and devices for handling gases in silencers. Later he lectured at the Eidgenoessische Technische Hochschule (Swiss Federal Institute of Technology), Zürich, which now holds Paul Jaray's archive.

Jaray died in 1974 in St. Gallen impoverished and forgotten by the automobile industry.

== See also ==
- Tatra
- Automobile drag coefficient
