= Mercedes-Benz 130 =

Model of car produced by Mercedez-Benz

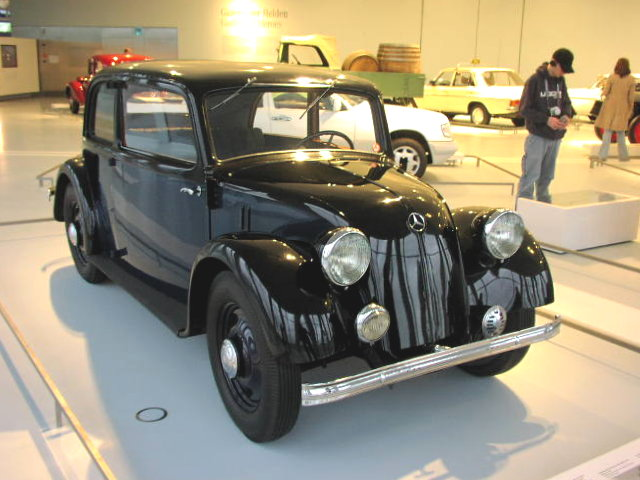
Mercedes-Benz 130 (1935)

From 1931 to 1939, Daimler-Benz AG produced three cars (Mercedes-Benz 130, 150 and 170 H) with rear engine as well as a few prototypes. Production numbers remained low for each of these models, especially compared with the production of conventional front-engine Mercedes-Benz cars.

== Development and prototypes (W17/W25D) ==
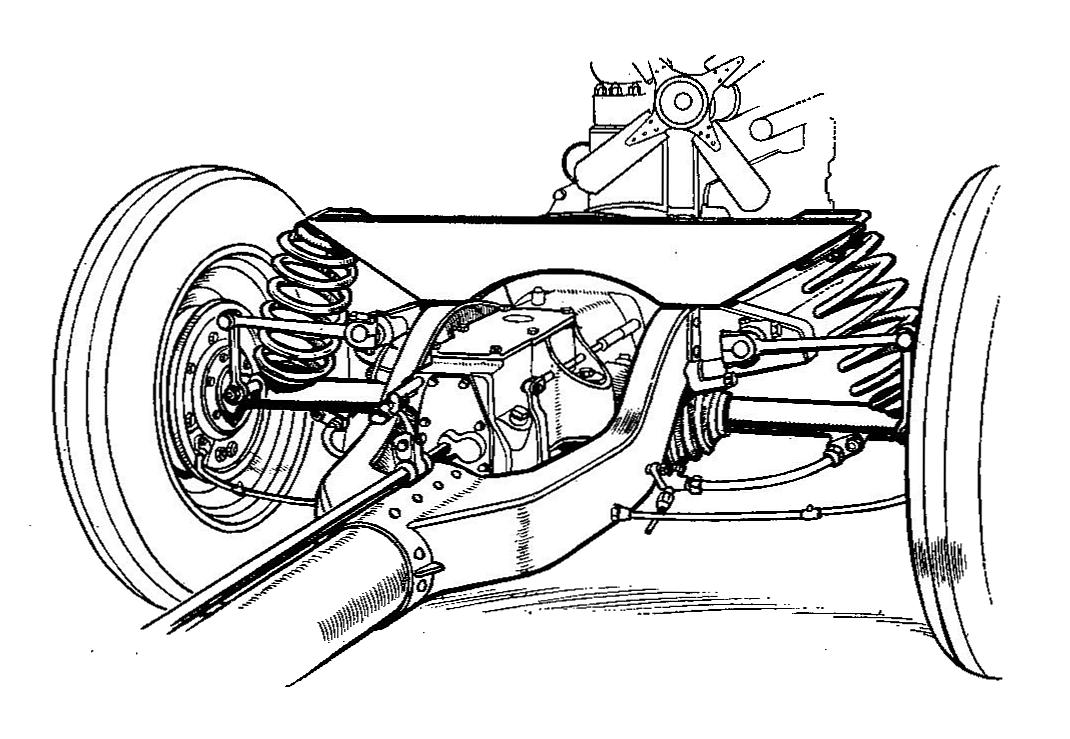
Mercedes 130H: backbone tube chassis and rear swing arm suspension

At the beginning of the 1930s, inspired by modern streamlined shapes, there were attempts to move car engines from the forward compartment to the rear of the car. Such a move allows a reduction in the volume of the front compartment. At the same time, the voluminous rear provides a lot of space above and behind the rear axle. Moreover, when engines are rear mounted, the drive shaft is eliminated. The most famous such development was with the 1930s Tatra 77, 87, and 97 under the leadership of Hans Ledwinka.

In 1930, Daimler-Benz entrusted Hans Nibel with the development of a small rear-engined car, starting from the same principles. In 1931, working with Max Wagner, the type W17 or 120(H) prototype was created. It had two doors, four seats, vertical front and rear wheel arches, and a four-cylinder boxer engine in the rear, with a displacement of 1,200 cc and a power of 25 hp (19 kW). There were also attempts with transverse four-cylinder inline engines. In 1932–33 Mercedes built a prototype with a front similar to the later VW Beetle, but a longer tail. The tail fin attached to the middle of the hood divides the oval rear window, so it anticipated the small oval two-piece rear window of the Beetle known as "pretzel form". The "D" refers to the three-cylinder diesel engine OM 134 with an output of 30 hp (22 kW). Due to high noise level, this vehicle was also rejected. From this type, 12 test cars were assembled.

== Mercedes-Benz 130 (W23) ==
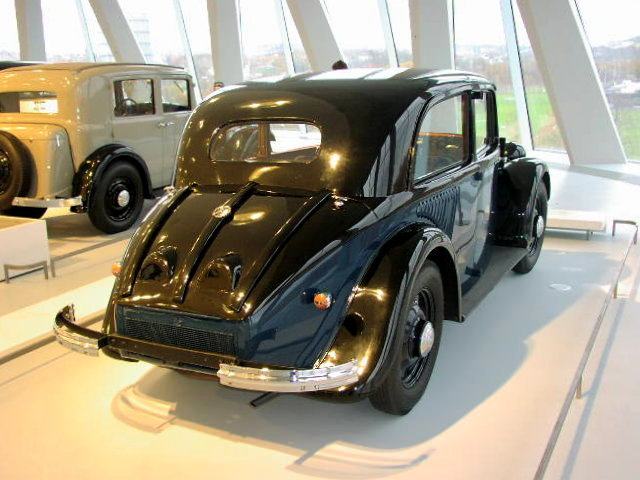
Mercedes-Benz 130 (1935)

The Mercedes-Benz 130 is an automobile built in Germany in small numbers in the 1930s. It was presented in February 1934 at the Berlin Car Show.

Conceived by Hans Nibel, chief engineer of Mercedes-Benz, the 130 was inspired by Edmund Rumpler's Tropfenwagen. It followed on the Rumpler-chassis Tropfenwagen racers, which ran between 1923 and 1926.

Created in 1931 by Nibel, it has a 1,308 cc side-valve four-cylinder engine mounted at the rear, with a fan between the rear coil springs. It drives a transmission with three forward speeds, plus a semi-automatic overdrive which did not require the use of a clutch. (A similar idea was adopted by Cord for the abortive 810 in 1935.) The backbone chassis ows something to Hans Ledwinka, and suspension is independent at all four corners. Daimler-Benz put the 130 in production in 1934. Due to its suspension, handling was poor, although adequate on German roads at the time, while its ride quality was superior to any other car in Germany.

The engine develops 26 hp (19 kW), giving the car a top speed of 92 km/h (57 mph). The synchronised four-speed gearbox (which VW later called 3 + E) is mounted in front of the rear axle, the balance being provided by coil springs. The front axle has two transverse leaf springs.

The car was sold as a sedan, an open-top sedan, or a convertible (with and without cabriolet cover and without side windows), each having two doors. Due to its extreme unbalance (two-thirds of the mass on the rear axle), the car has very awkward handling. Because of the low sales volume, the model was discontinued in 1936.

Nibel followed the 130 with a more powerful 150, with chassis designed by Daimler's Max Wagner.

== Mercedes-Benz 150 (W30) ==
Mercedes-Benz 150 from ca. 1935
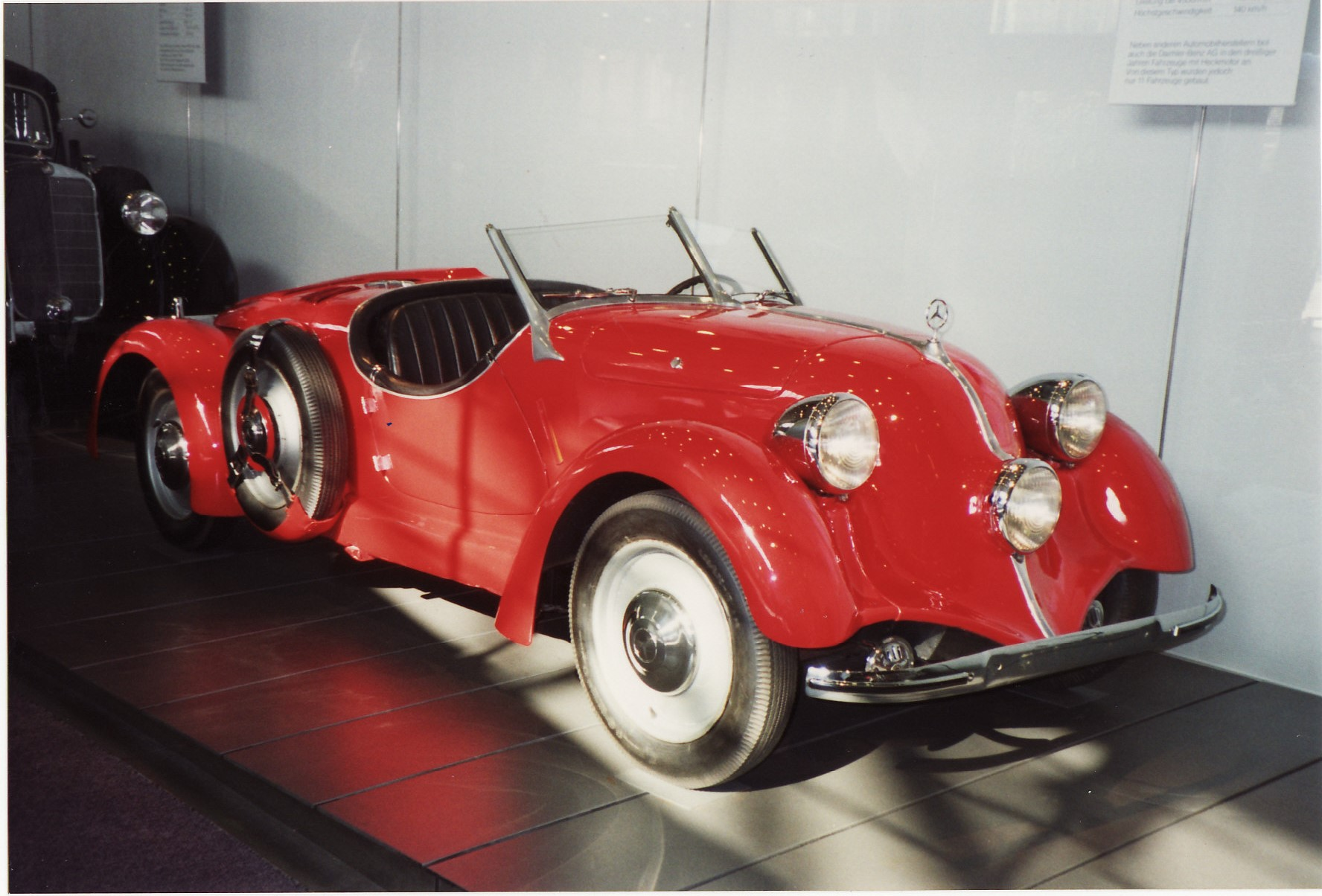
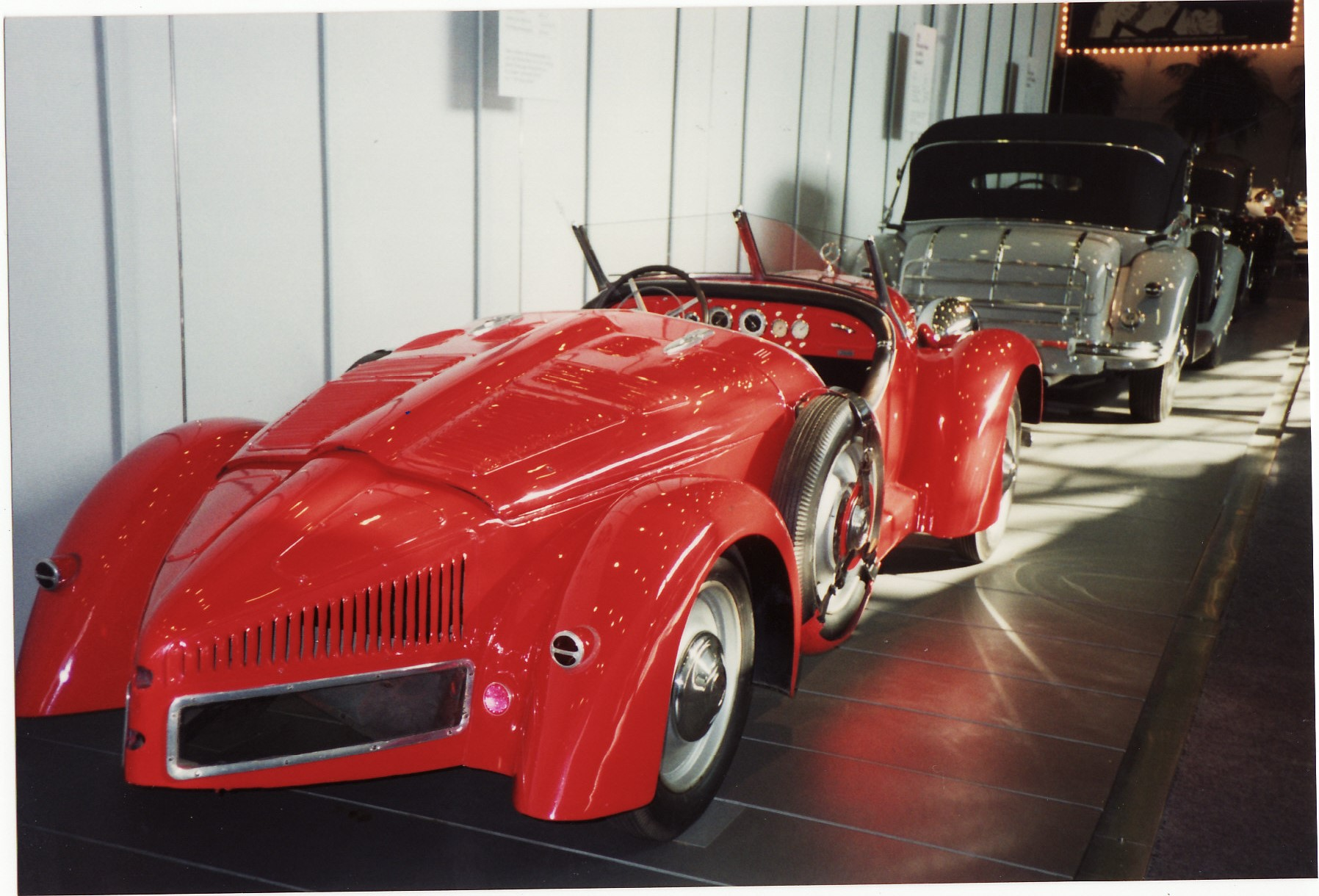

The Mercedes-Benz 150 is a prototype sports racing car that was built in Germany in the 1930s. It was derived in 1935 from the 130 with only two seats and a larger engine. It displaced 1,498 cc (91.4 cu in), developed 55 hp (41 kW), and gave the car a 125 km/h (78 mph) top speed.

Conceived by Hans Nibel, chief engineer of Mercedes-Benz,, and before the 1926 merger, of Benz. The 150 was inspired by Edmund Rumpler's mid-engine Tropfen-Auto which was licensed by Benz in 1921. It followed on the Rumpler-chassis Benz RH Tropfenwagen racers, which ran between 1923 and 1926, and is based on the backbone chassis of earlier 130.

Created in 1934 by Nibel and chassis engineer Max Wagner. the 150 is a two-seat sports roadster. It featured transverse leaf spring front and coil-sprung swing axle rear suspension. A water-cooled 1,498 cc OHC four-cylinder engine, producing 55 hp (41 kW), is mounted in back. The radiator is behind that, above the transaxle, with a squirrel-cage blower (reminiscent of the VW Typ 1) feeding both radiator and carburetor. The roadster has disc wheels, DuVal-style windshield, side-mounted spare wheel fastened with straps, and three headlights, the third mounted at the lip of the hood above the bumper.

The car was only offered as a Sport Roadster. The fuel tank, which in the case of the Mercedes-Benz 130 is above the engine, was transferred to the front compartment, and therefore there was no room for luggage there. The practicality of the 150 was therefore very limited, and the price of the car was quite high at 6,600 RM. As a comparison the Mercedes-Benz 170 V had a price of 5,500 RM. The car was discontinued in 1936 due to poor sales.

Six 150s were built as coupes, "with low-drag lines that eerily presaged the VW Beetle". They were raced in several rallies, demonstrating much better handling than the 130, before Nibel and Wagner turned to Grand Prix cars. Only twenty were produced before the 150H was abandoned in 1936.

The last remaining 150 Sport Roadster was fully restored mechanically by the Mercedes-Benz Classic Center in Irvine, California in 2010.

== Mercedes-Benz 170 H (W28) ==
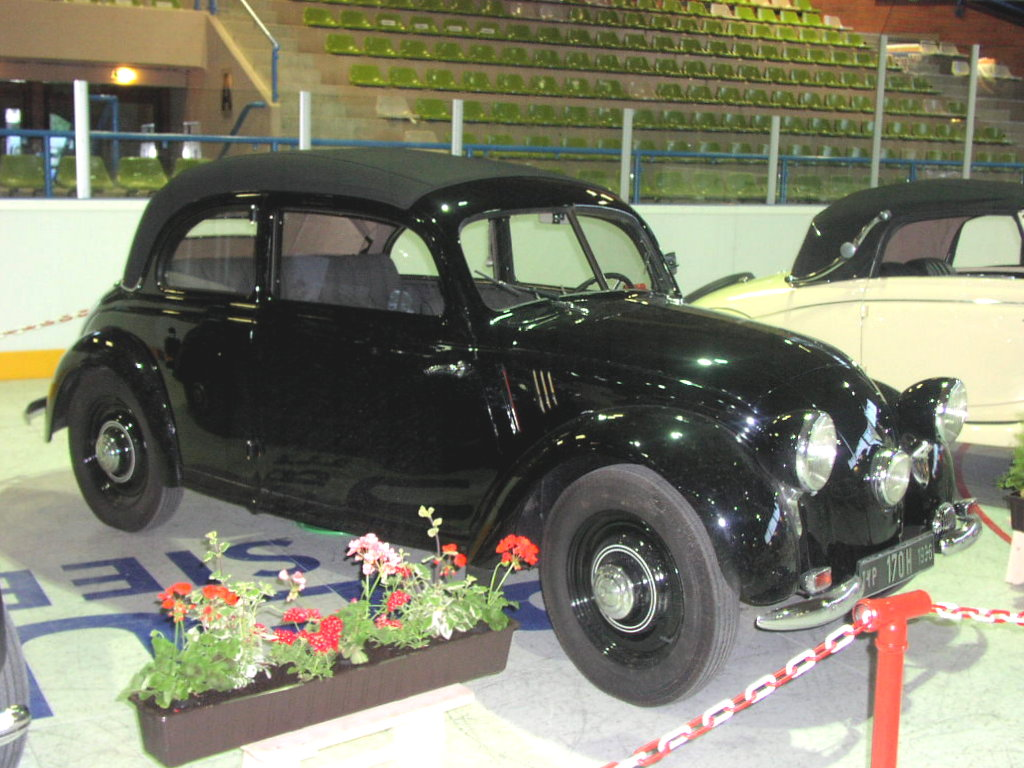
Mercedes-Benz 170 H (1936)

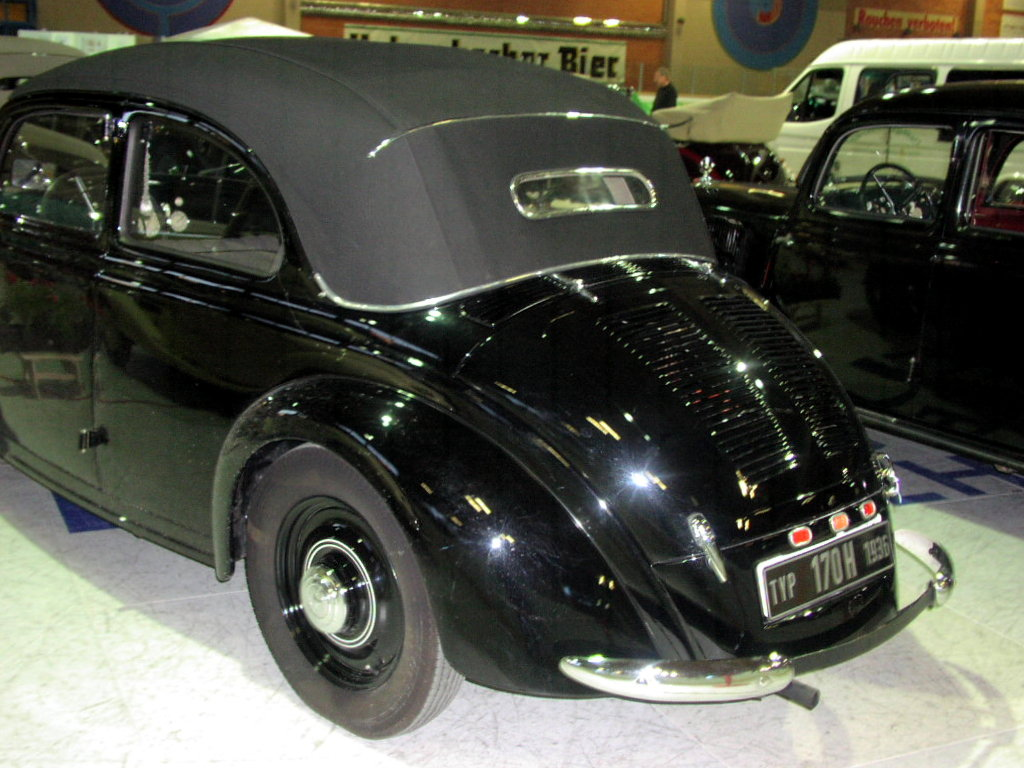
Mercedes-Benz 170 H (1936)

In 1936, in parallel to the classical front-engine Mercedes-Benz 170 V, Daimler-Benz introduced the Mercedes-Benz 170 H which had the same engine as the 170 V, with an architecture derived from that of the 130, its predecessor. The "H" stands for Heckmotor, meaning "rear engine". The 170 H has a four-cylinder 1,697 cc engine that develops 38 hp (28 kW).

The car cost significantly more than the 170 V (two-door sedan 170 V - 3,750 RM, 170 H - 4,350 RM) but offered much less room in the trunk, a much louder engine, and poor handling. But it handled better than the 130, was more comfortably equipped, and was therefore considered as a "finer" car. The 170 H sold less well than the 170 V. As well as the sedan, there was also a convertible sedan. Production stopped in 1939 due to the War and the low demand.

Forty years later a company spokesman suggested that the car's relative lack of commercial success was due to the rear mounting of the engine and the resulting absence of the "characteristic Mercedes-Benz tall radiator". The same spokesman highlighted the similarity of the car's overall architecture and some of its detailing to that of the later highly successful Volkswagen Beetle: Dr Porsche, creator of the Volkswagen, had been chief engineer at Daimler-Benz between 1923 and 1928 when the little rear-engined Mercedes-Benz sedans were under development.

Because these cars, unlike front-engined sister models, were not widely used, and also not suitable for conversion to wood gas generator, the Wehrmacht did not requisition them. Therefore, an above-average number of models survived the Second World War in private hands without damage. Most were used to exhaustion in the early post-war years. Today, surviving examples remain among the rarest and most sought-after Mercedes-Benz models.

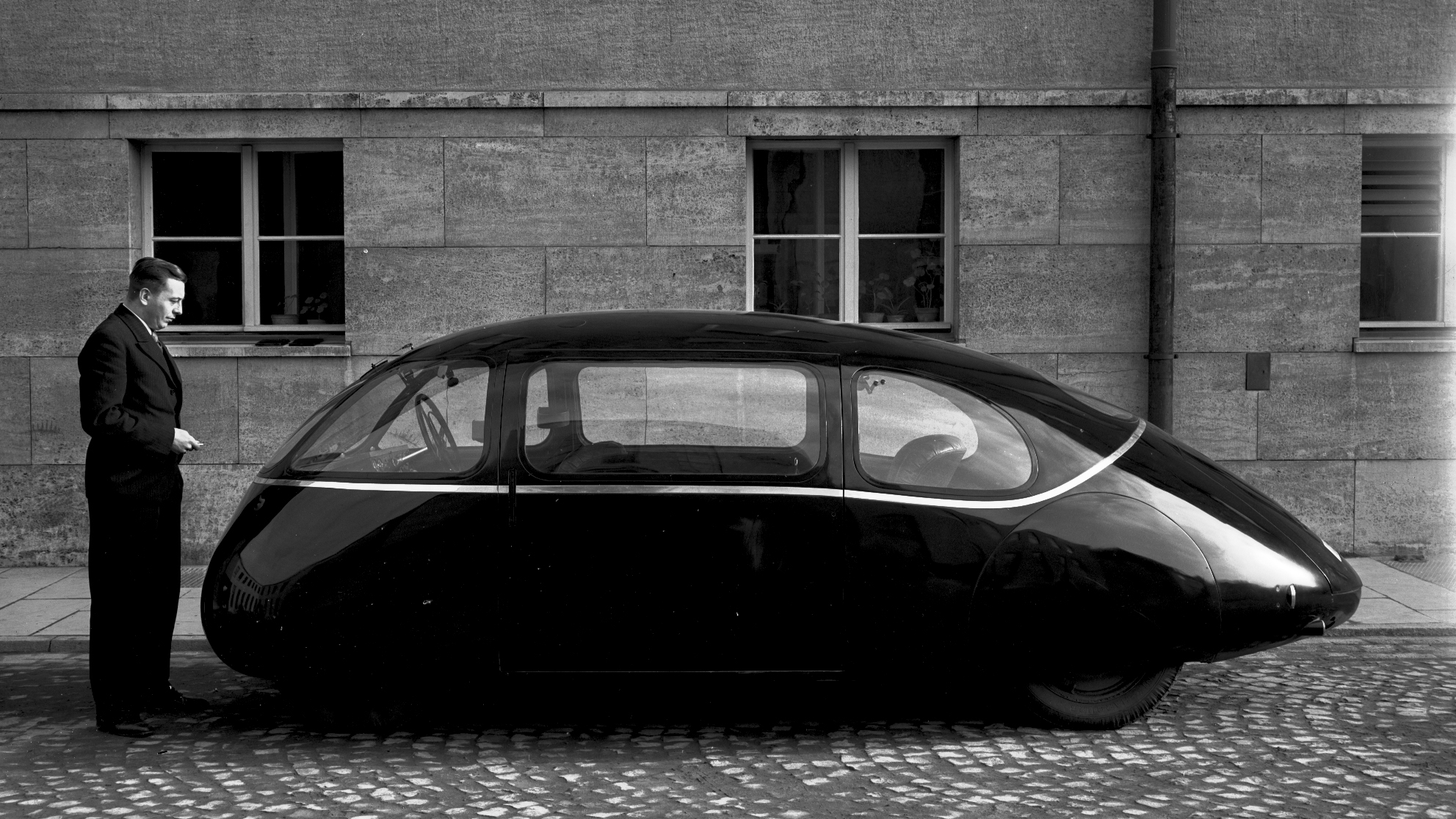
Schlörwagen with 170H chassis

In addition, engineer Karl Schlör from Krauss-Maffei used the 170H chassis to build a pod-like streamliner called the Schlörwagen (nicknamed "Egg" or "Pillbug"). In wind tunnel tests before the Second World War it demonstrated the remarkably low drag coefficient of only 0.113. It was displayed at the 1939 Berlin Auto Show; its fate is unknown.

== Source ==
- Oswald, Werner: Mercedes-Benz Personenwagen 1886–1986, Motorbuch-Verlag Stuttgart 1987, ISBN 3-613-01133-6
