= Dymaxion (disambiguation) =

Dymaxion is a term coined by Buckminster Fuller to describe his work.

Dymaxion may also refer to:

- Dymaxion map, a map projection that minimizes distortion of landmasses
- Dymaxion car
- Dymaxion house
- Dymaxion Chronofile
- Dymaxion deployment unit
- The Last Dymaxion, a 2012 documentary film
