= Stout Scarab =

1930–1940s American minivan

Stout Motor Car Company
- Industry: Automotive
- Predecessor: Stout Engineering Laboratories
- Founded: 1936; 90 years ago
- Founder: William B. Stout
- Defunct: 1946; 80 years ago
- Fate: ceased production
- Headquarters: Detroit, Michigan, United States
- Key people: William B. Stout, John Tjaarda
- Products: Automobiles
- Production output: 9 plus 1 concept car (1932-1946)

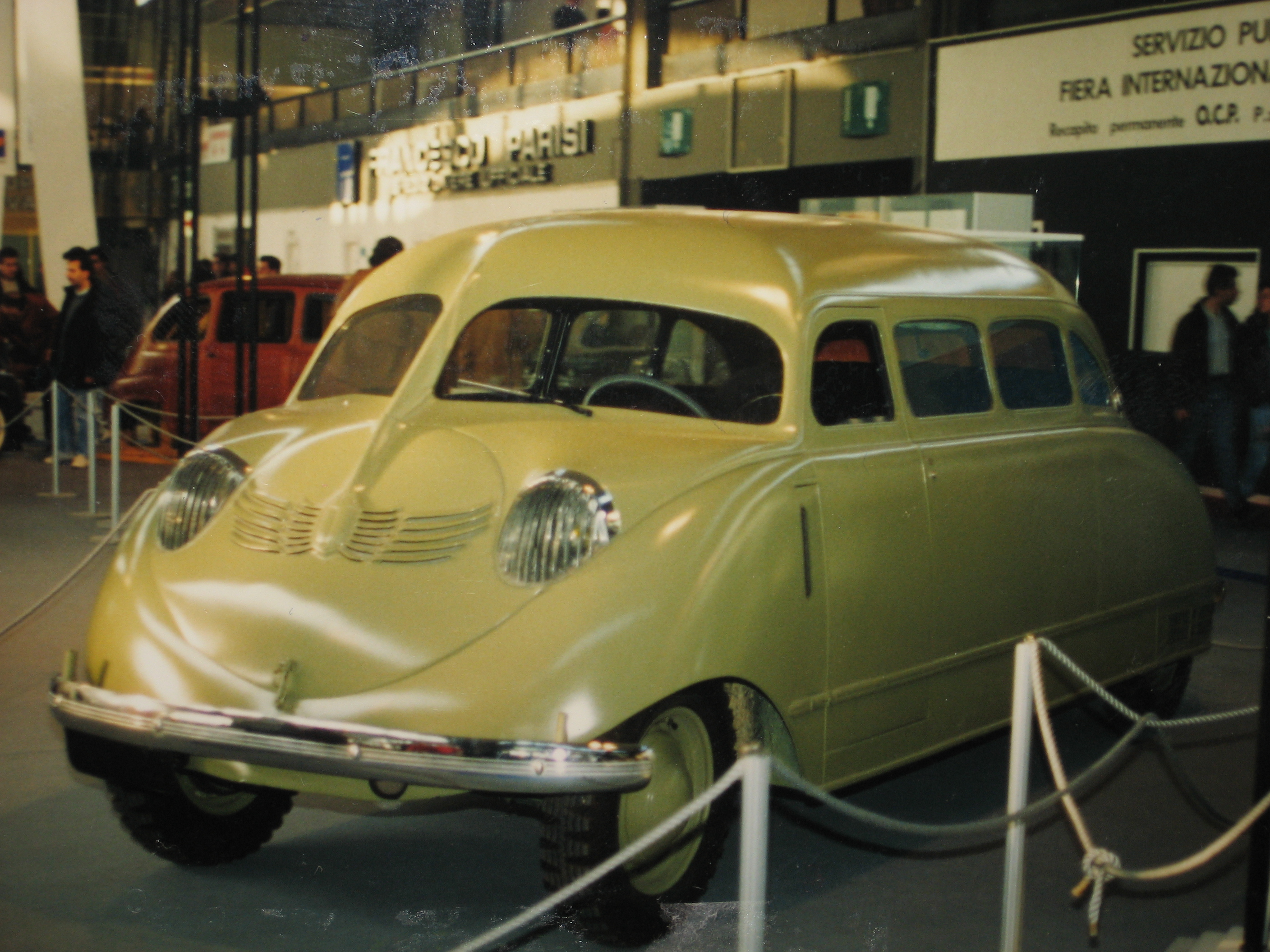
Stout Scarab on display in Genoa, Italy

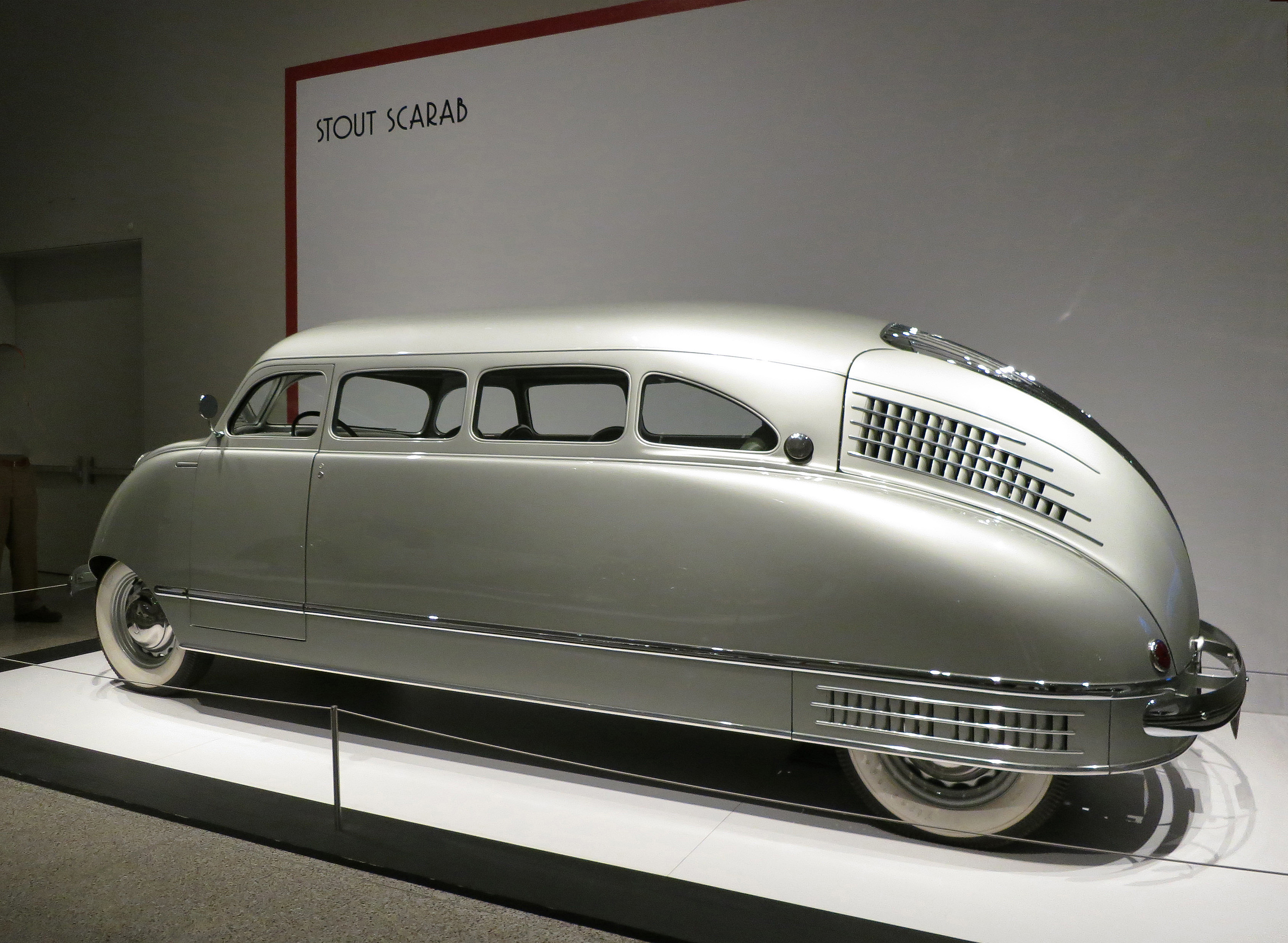
Stout Scarab on display at Houston Fine Arts Museum

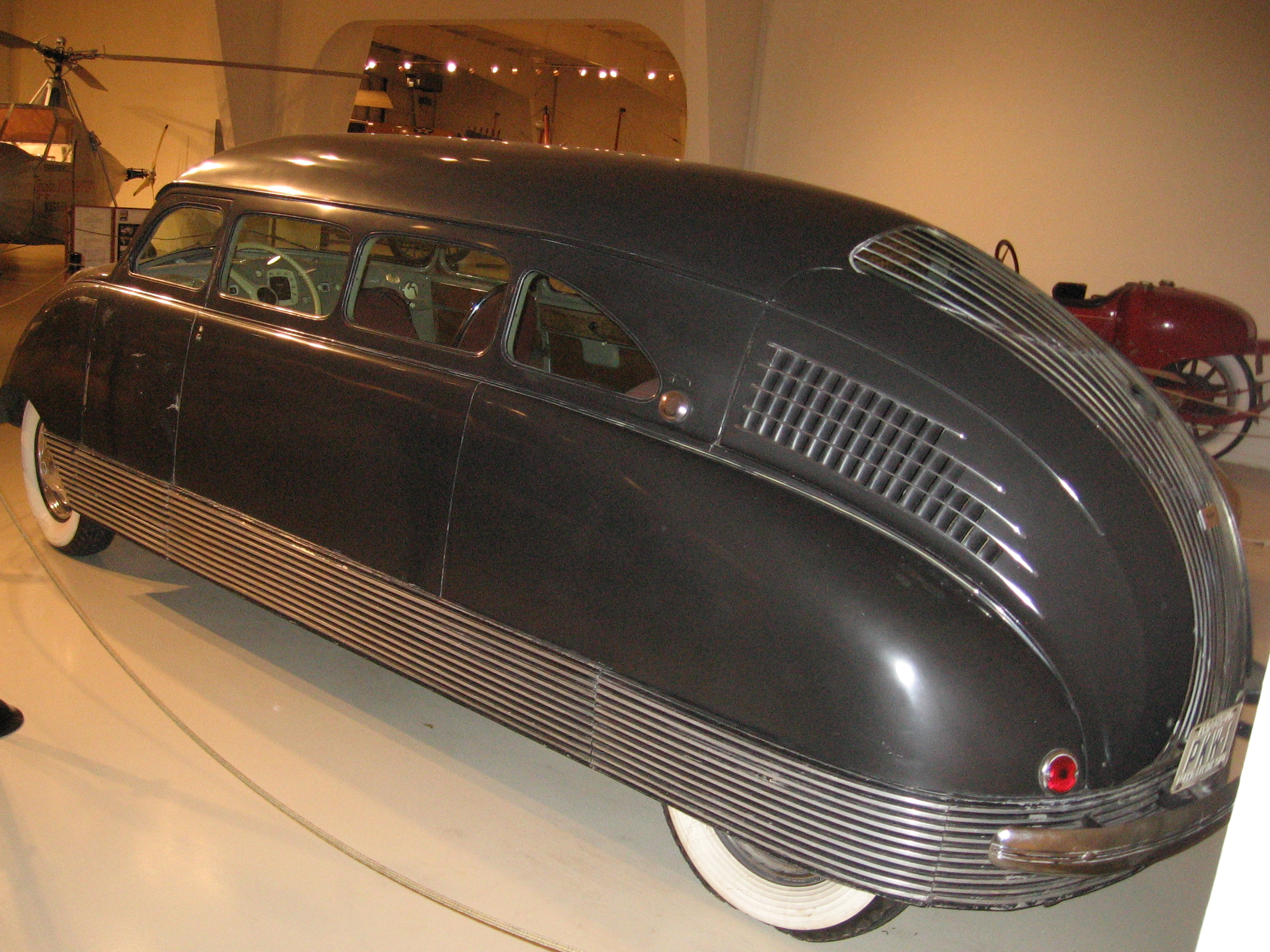
1935 Scarab at Owls Head Transportation Museum (Owls Head, Maine)

The Stout Scarab is a streamlined car, designed by William Bushnell Stout and manufactured by Stout Engineering Laboratories and later by Stout Motor Car Company of Detroit, Michigan.

The Stout Scarab is credited by some as the world's first production minivan, and a 1946 experimental prototype of the Scarab became the world's first car with a fiberglass bodyshell and air suspension.

== Background ==
William B. Stout was a motorcar and aviation engineer and journalist. While president of the Society of Automotive Engineers, Stout met Buckminster Fuller at a major New York auto show and wrote an article on the Dymaxion Car for the society's newsletter.

Contemporary production cars commonly had a separate chassis and body with a long hood. The engine compartment and engine were behind the front axle and ahead of the passenger compartment. The front-mounted engine typically drove the rear axle through a drive shaft underneath the floor of the vehicle. This layout worked well, but limited the passenger space.

In contrast, the Scarab design eliminated the chassis and drive shaft to create a low, flat floor for the interior, using a unitized body structure and placing a Ford-built V8 engine in the rear of the vehicle. Stout envisioned his traveling machine as an office on wheels. To that end, the Scarab's body, styled by John Tjaarda, a Dutch automobile engineer, closely emulated the design of an aluminum aircraft fuselage. The use of lighter materials resulted in a vehicle weighing under 3,000 lb (1,400 kg).

The short, streamlined nose and tapering upper body at the rear foreshadowed contemporary monospace (or one-box) MPV or minivan design, featuring a removable table and second row seats that turn 180 degrees to face the rear — a feature that Chrysler marketed over 50 years later as "Swivel ’n Go".

Although reminiscent of the Chrysler Airflow, streamliner, and the slightly later (1938) Volkswagen Beetle — other aerodynamically efficient shapes, the Stout Scarab was generally considered ugly at the time. Decades later, its futuristic design and curvaceous, finely detailed nose earn it respect as an Art Deco icon.

== Innovative features ==
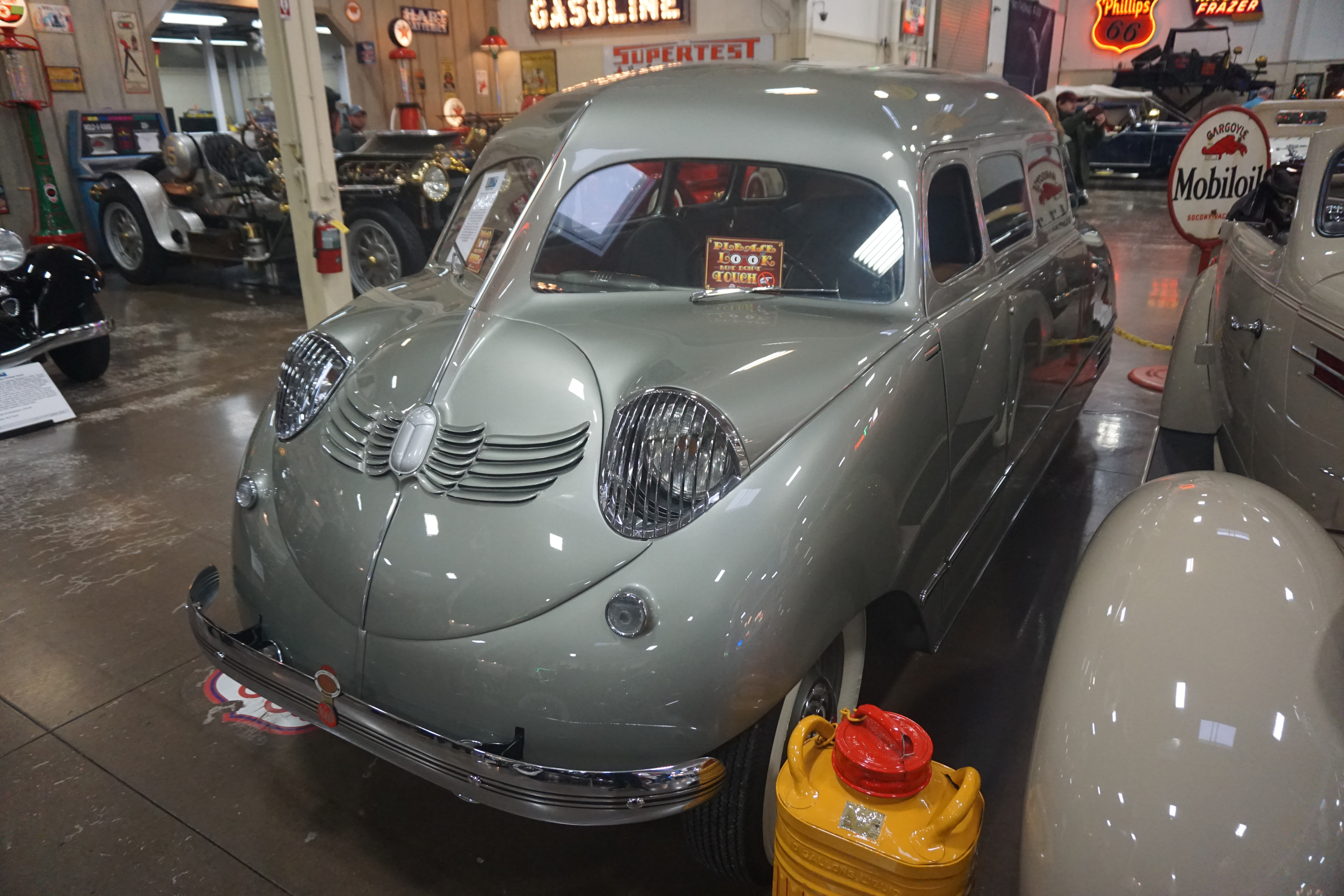
Front view of Stout Scarab at Stahls Automotive Collection

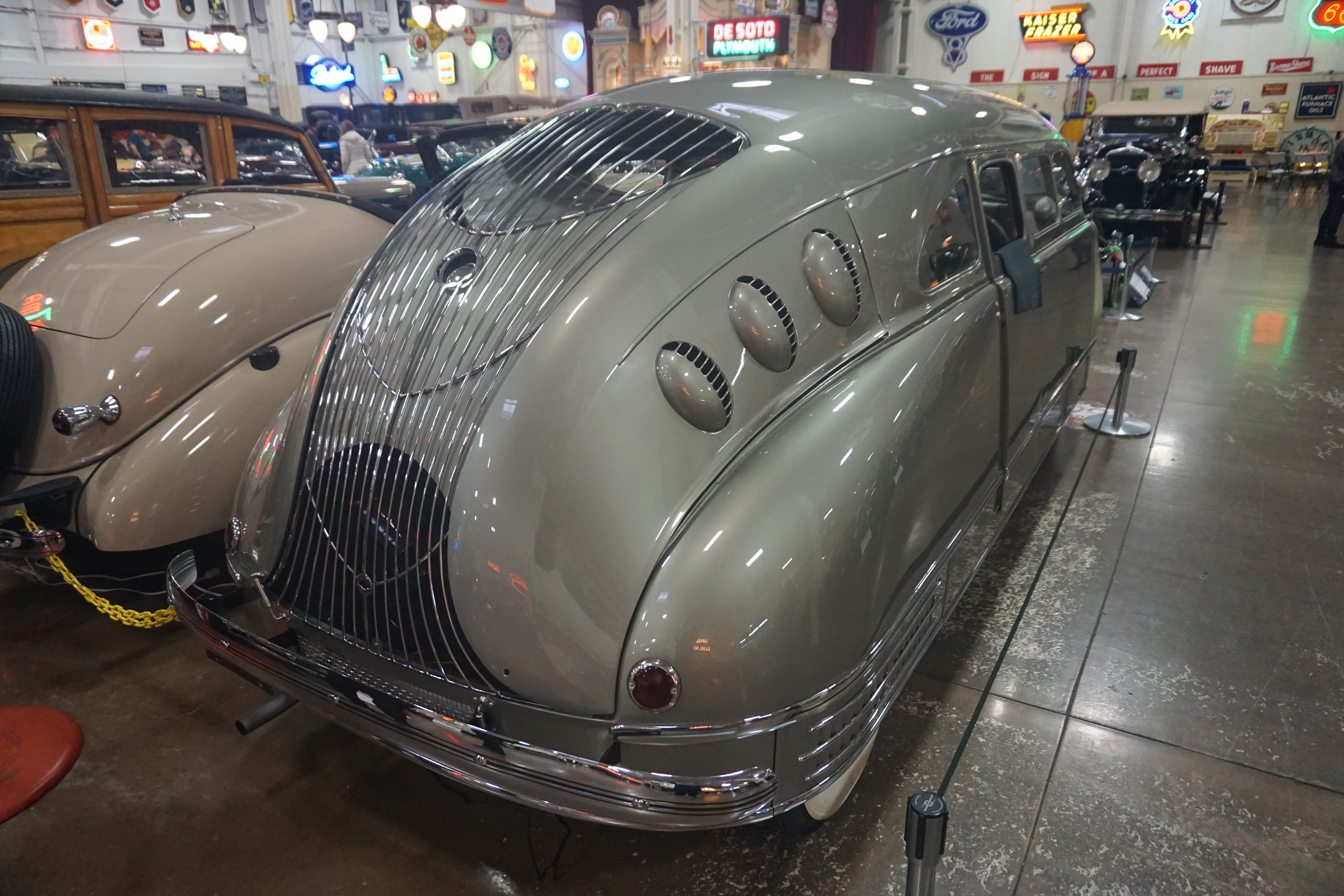
Rear view of Stout Scarab

The Scarab's interior space was maximized by its ponton styling, which dispensed with running boards and expanded the cabin to the full width of the car. A long wheelbase and the engine directly over the rear axle moved the driver forward, enabling a steering wheel almost directly above the front wheels. Passengers entered through a single, large, common door. A flexible seating system could be easily reconfigured (except for the driver's seat, which was fixed). The design anticipated the seating in modern minivans, such as the Chrysler Voyager and Renault Espace; a small card table could be fitted with the passenger seats as needed. Interiors were appointed in leather, chrome, and wood. Design elements also worked in a stylized ancient Egyptian scarab motif, including the car's emblem. Visibility to the front and sides was similar to that of an observation car, although rearward vision was negligible and there were no rear-view mirrors.

The innovations did not end with the car's layout and body design. In an era where almost everything on the road had rigid axles with leaf springs, the Scarab featured independent suspension using coil springs on all four corners, providing a smoother, quieter ride. The rear-engine-induced weight bias coupled to the coil spring suspension and "Oil Shock Absorbers" endowed the Scarab with "Smooth Riding and Easy Steering on Rough Roads", if not very good handling and traction (even by the standards of the early 1930s, the reputation of the Scarab was one of very poor "blackjack-like" handling). The rear swing axle suspension with long coil spring struts was inspired by aircraft landing gear. The Scarab suspension inspired the later Chapman strut used by Lotus from their Lotus Twelve model of 1957.

The Ford flat-head V8 drove the rear wheels via a custom Stout-built three-speed manual transaxle. The engine was reversed from its normal position, mounted directly over the rear axle and with the flywheel and clutch facing forward. The transmission was mounted ahead of this, reversing and lowering the drive-line back to the axle. This unusual layout was later repeated by the Lamborghini Countach.

== Production ==
A drivable prototype of the Scarab was completed in 1932, probably the first car to have an aluminum spaceframe unit-construction body. Some frame parts were steel. The second prototype was ready in 1935, with some styling and mechanical changes. The headlamps were set behind a fine, vertical-bar grille, and at the rear, narrow chrome bars curved from the back window down to the bumper, giving the car its Art Deco appearance. The body was changed to steel to reduce cost.

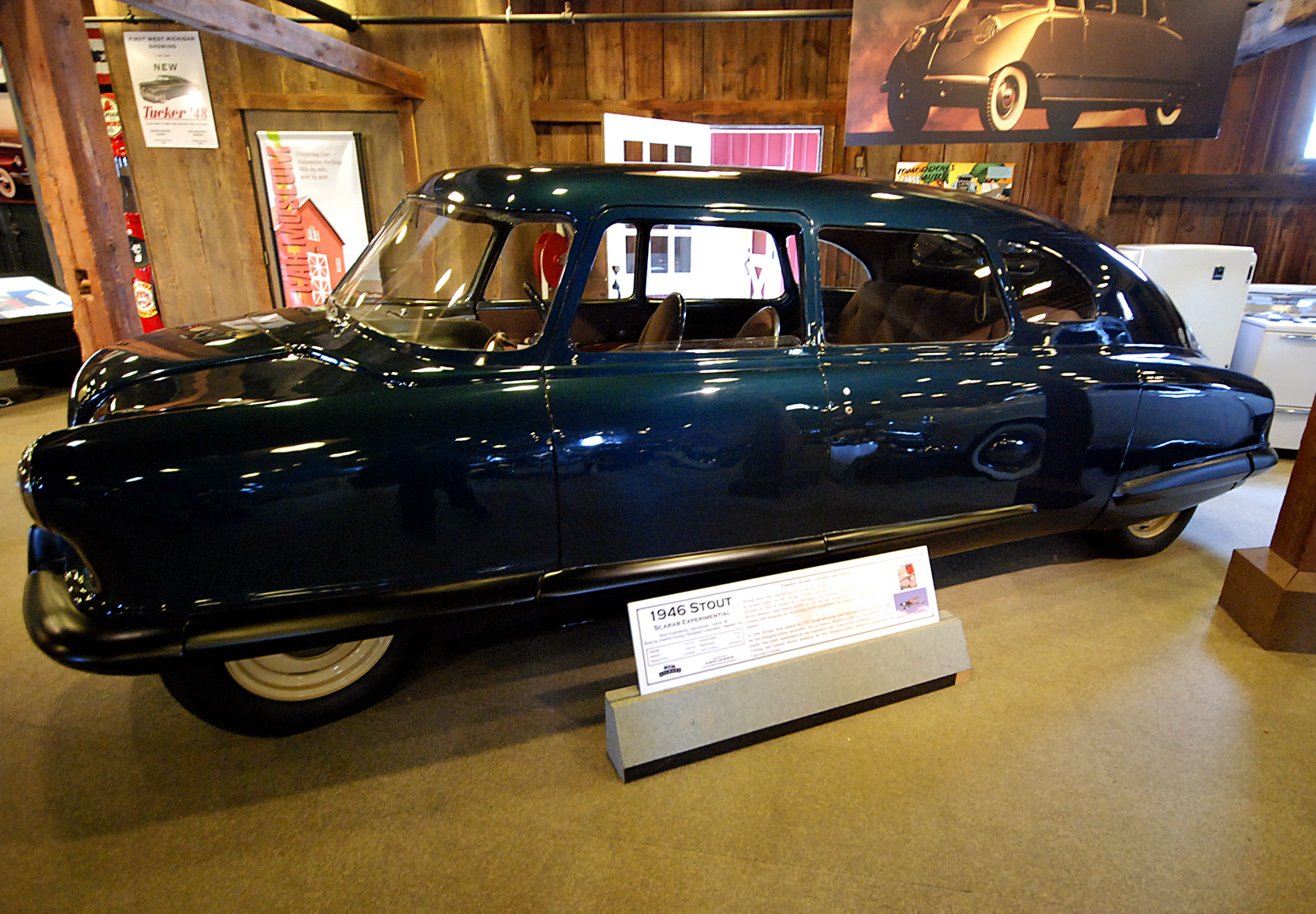
Stout Scarab Experimental (1946)

Stout stated that the car would be manufactured in limited quantities and sold by invitation. Up to a hundred a year were to be made in a small factory at the corner of Scott Street and Telegraph Road (US 24), Dearborn, Michigan. Although the Scarab garnered much press coverage, at $5,000 (equivalent to $116,007 in 2025), when a luxurious and ultra-modern Chrysler Imperial Airflow cost just $1,345, very few could pay the hefty premium for innovation. Nine Scarabs are believed to have been built. The vehicles were never produced in volume and were hand-made, with no two Scarabs identical.

Immediately following World War II, Stout built one more prototype Scarab, called the Stout Scarab Experimental. It was exhibited in 1946 and was more conventional in appearance, although still equipped with a rear engine. It was a 2-door, featured a wraparound windshield and the world's first fiberglass body. Like its metal counterparts, it too was a monocoque, built up out of only eight separate pieces and featured the world's first fully functioning air suspension, previously developed in 1933 by Firestone. It was never produced.

== Legacy ==
Stout owned and drove his own Scarab, accumulating over 250,000 miles in travel around the United States.

Up to five Scarabs are reported to survive. A 1935 Scarab in running condition was on display for many years at the Owls Head Transportation Museum in Owls Head, Maine, but was returned to its lender, the Detroit Historical Museum. The Detroit Historical Museum's vehicle was scheduled to be returned to the museum's storage on August 21, 2016, when another car would be rotated into the exhibition.

== See also ==
- Brubaker Box
- Streamliner: Automobiles for overview of early aerodynamic automobiles

Other early teardrop-shaped cars, chronologically

- Rumpler Tropfenwagen (1921), first aerodynamic "teardrop" car to be designed and serially produced (about 100 units built)
- Persu car (1922-23), designed by Romanian engineer Aurel Persu, improved on the Tropfenwagen by placing the wheels inside the car body
- Dymaxion car (1933), US
- Schlörwagen (1939), German prototype, never produced
