= Aurel Persu =

Romanian engineer and inventor

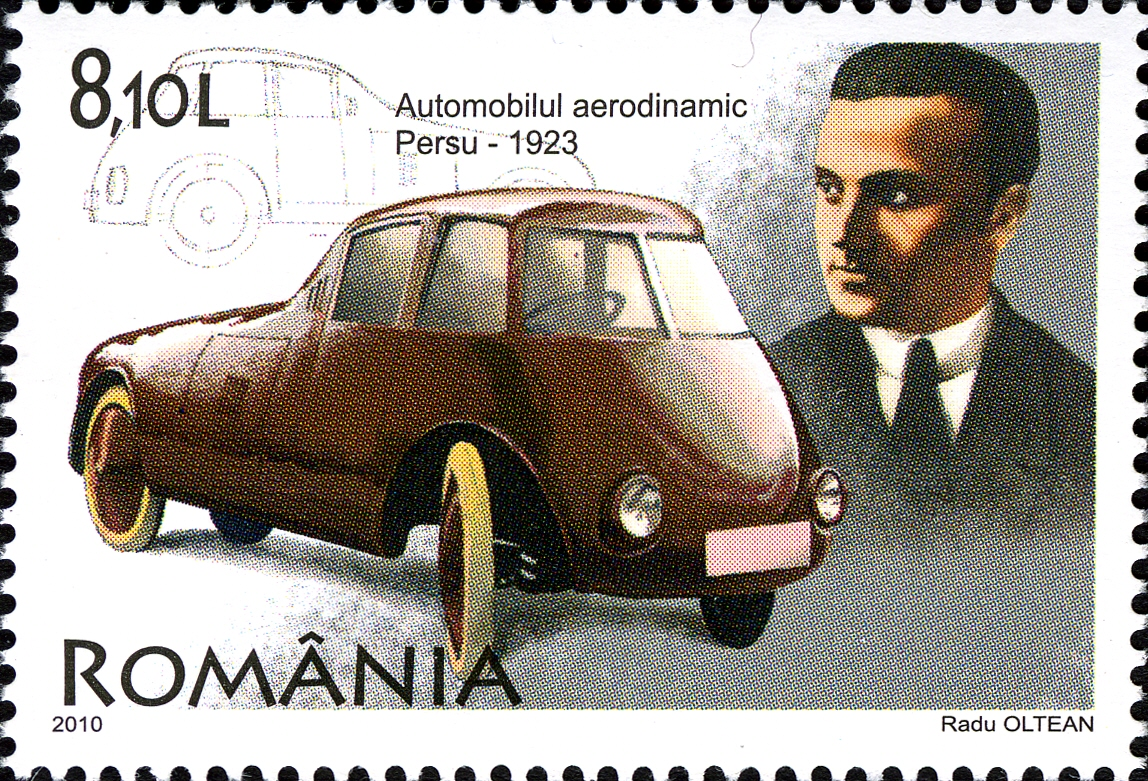
Aurel Persu on a 2010 Romanian stamp

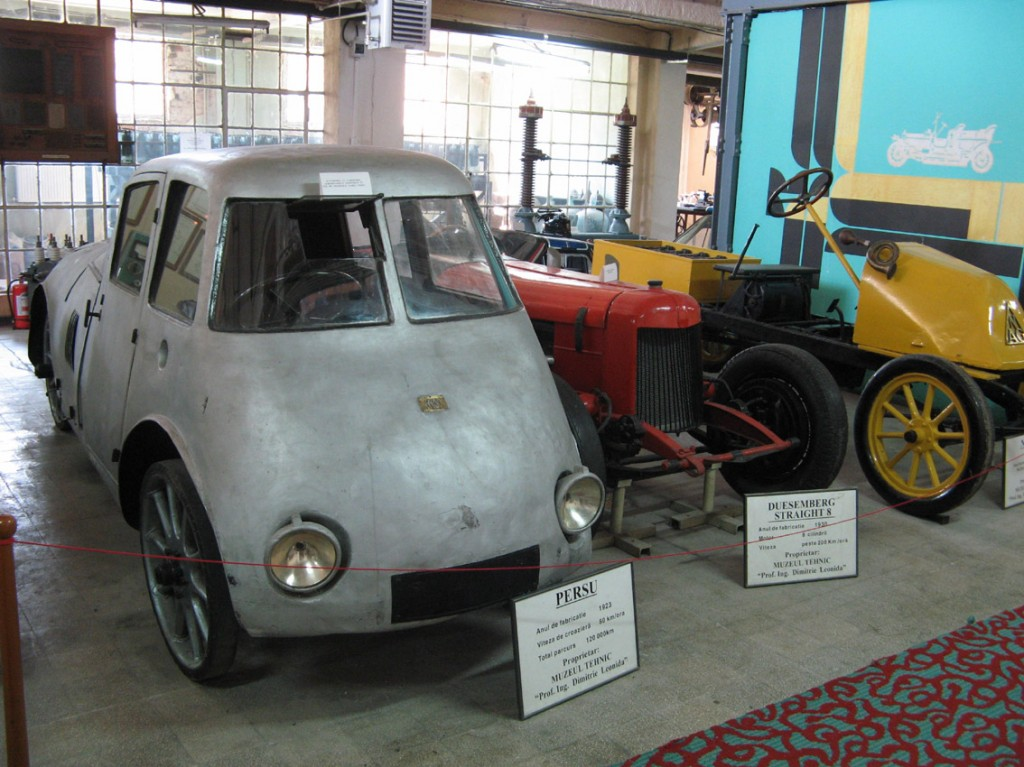
Aurel Persu automobile

Aurel Persu (26 December 1890 – 5 May 1977) was a Romanian engineer and pioneer car designer, the first to place the wheels inside the body of the car as part of his attempt to reach the perfect aerodynamic shape for automobiles. He came to the conclusion that the perfectly aerodynamic automobile must have the shape of a falling water drop, taking it one step further toward that shape than the car Austrian Edmund Rumpler had presented in Berlin in 1921.

== Patented aerodynamic design ==
Persu, a specialist in airplanes aerodynamics and dynamics, implemented his idea in 1922–1923 in Berlin, building an automobile with an incredibly low drag coefficient of 0.28 (same as a modern Porsche Carrera) or even 0.22 (still rare among modern production cars), depending on the source. This drag coefficient was far better that the 0.8–1.0 common with automobiles used at that time. This allowed for the fuel consumption to decrease. It was the first car to have the wheels inside its aerodynamic line, which we take for granted today. This was Persu's main innovation compared to the 1921 Rumpler Tropfenwagen ("drop car") of Austrian engineer Edmund Rumpler. Persu's design received German patent number 402683 in 1924 and US patent 1648505 in 1927.

== Technical museum ==
The original automobile ran for 120,000 kilometres (75,000 mi). Aurel Persu donated it fully functional in 1961 to the Dimitrie Leonida Technical Museum in Bucharest where it has since been on display.

== Derivative car designs ==
The original design work of Aurel Persu inspired future iconic American car designs:

- Aptera
- Dymaxion car, designed by Buckminster Fuller

== See also ==
- Streamliner: Automobiles – for overview of early aerodynamic automobiles

Other early "teardrop" cars, chronologically:

- Rumpler Tropfenwagen (1921), first aerodynamic "teardrop" car to be designed and serially produced (about 100 units built)
- Stout Scarab (1932–1935, 1946), US
- Dymaxion car (1933), US
- Schlörwagen (1939), German prototype, never produced
