= Hampshire Country School =

School in New Hampshire, United States

Coordinates: 42°44′28″N 71°56′24″W

Hampshire Country School (HCS) is a private boarding school for Twice Exceptional children in Rindge, New Hampshire, United States, founded by Henry Curtis Patey and Adelaide Walker Patey in 1948. Formerly a co-educational school, it is now a boarding school for boys between 8 and 17 years who have difficulty in other settings. The majority of the students are enrolled in grades 3 through 9.

== Description ==
The campus includes modest buildings, three lakes, and part of the Wapack Range, a mountain ridge east of the center of campus. Daily life is structured, with after-school and weekend activities plus time for organized outdoor and indoor play. The school operates a small farm as part of the academic and residential program. The school also has a five-week summer program for boys between 8 and 14 years of age.

Hampshire Country School is not a treatment facility and does not provide treatment for any condition. While in the first 30 years of the school, Hampshire Country School provided residential treatment for children managing various emotional and environmental stresses, the school has never served one type of child, or specialized in any one particular diagnosis. More recent challenges managed by some of the HCS children in the 1980s and 1990s could be associated with Asperger syndrome, nonverbal learning disorder and attention deficit hyperactivity disorder.

Henry Patey died in 1976, and Adelaide Patey continued as Director until her retirement in 1982 (at age 90). She was succeeded by Peter Ray, who had worked intermittently at the school from 1968 through the early 1970s. Mr. Ray returned in the late 1970s to be Assistant Director and, after Mrs. Patey’s retirement, Headmaster. In 1996, William Dickerman, a psychologist who had been on the faculty since 1971, became Headmaster. In January 2020, Dickerman, affectionately known to the students as 'Doc', died at Meadows House, HCS. He was 78. In 2009, Bernd Föcking, a former teacher and dorm parent became Headmaster. In 2019 the board changed the title of Headmaster to Head of School and Elizabeth Bruno became Principal before transitioning into the role of Head of School in 2020. In 2021 Beth Venable became the Head of School. In 2024, Chris Heys, former Head of the Academic Department and teacher was elected by the board as Hampshire Country School’s 8th Head of School.

The school has entered into an agreement with the Northeast Wilderness Trust to protect the grounds in perpetuity. These grounds were originally a farm. The Wapack Trail runs along the Stony Top mountain ridge on one portion of the grounds.

== History ==
Patey advocated the concept of milieu therapy, and in the 1970s the school published an in-house journal called the Journal of Residential Therapy.

In the 1970s the school had a co-ed student population. Students lived at the school year-round and stayed in tents in a summer camp called Camp Timbertop for most of the summer. Many of these students were supported by Massachusetts special education grants. Massachusetts funding for special education under Chapter 750 became more restricted in 1972 under Chapter 766, and as a result the school elected to discontinue accepting children funded by special education funds and began limiting the student population. In 1996 the school population decreased to the current desired size of about 25 boys specifically selected for their intelligence, playfulness and good nature creating a healthy, tighter community for the students.

From the 1960s to her death in 2008, actress and screenwriter Kay Linaker (aka Kate Phillips) was an English teacher and drama coach at the school.

Animal scientist and author Temple Grandin (one of her biographies refers to the school as "The Hampshire School for Wayward Wizards", a sort of Hogwarts for today) as well as comedian Noel Murphy are alumni.
