= Noel Murphy (comedian) =

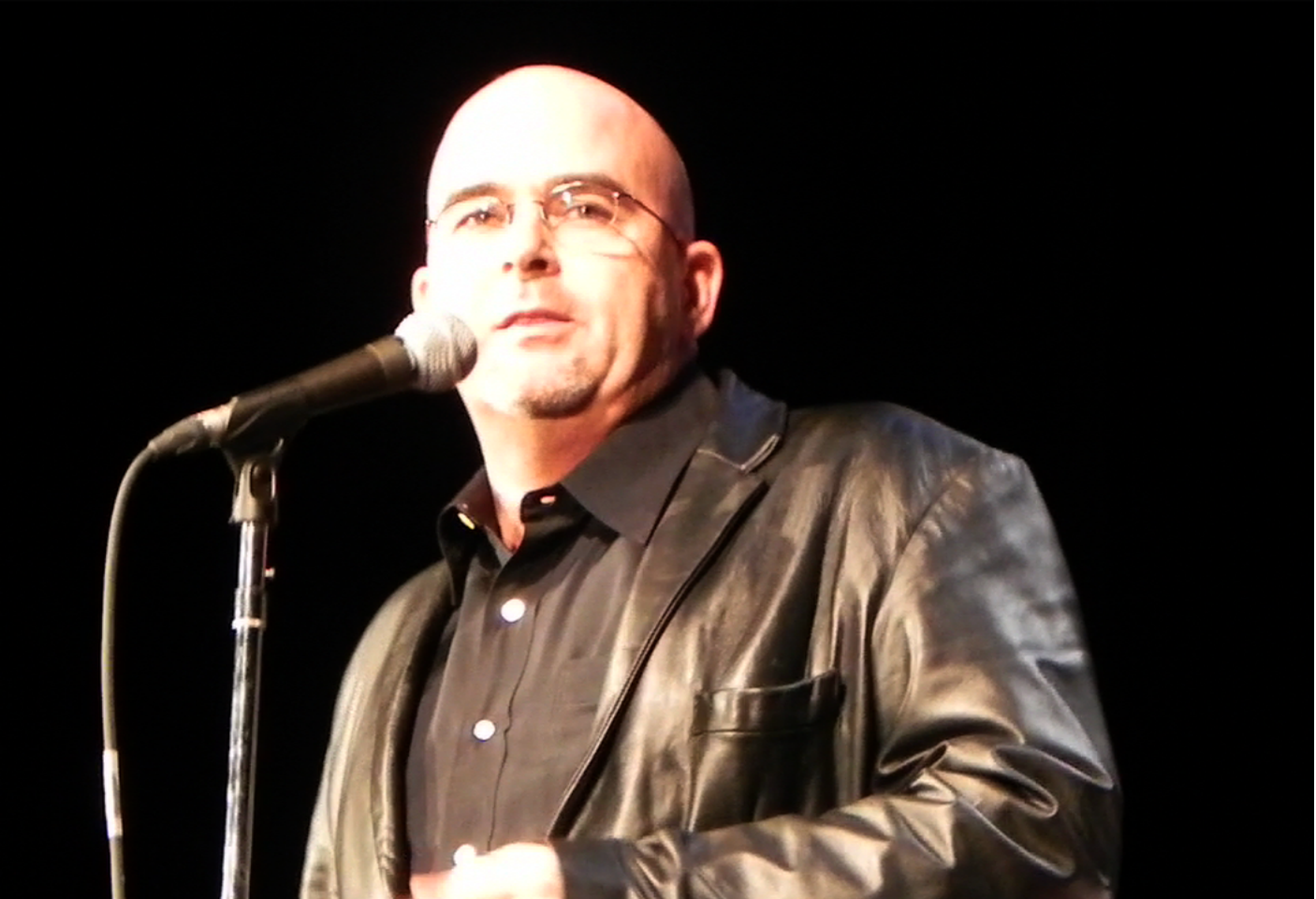
- Noel Murphy opening for Bill Cosby, Santa Cruz Civic Center, 2010
- Born: July 25, 1961 (age 65); Grosse Point, Michigan

Comedy career
- Years active: 1980–present
- Medium: Stand-up, television

Noel Murphy (born July 25, 1961) is an American stand-up comedian and a film director. He managed the New York Comedy Club from a failing venue to one of the top showcase clubs in New York City. He currently lives in California.

== Short Bio ==
Born in Grosse Pointe, Michigan, United States to parents John and Patricia Murphy, Murphy attended Hampshire Country School, Harvard and Second City.

== Media career ==
Murphy began his stand-up comedy career in the early 80's in Boston at the Ding Ho Comedy Club. His first stage appearance was at Harvard University with Boston Storyteller Brother Blue in 1971. He is the author of the book "How to Talk Funny and Influence People". His show "The Noel Murphy Show" ran for 11 years on SCTV in Central Coast California. In his stand-up comedy career he has worked professionally with Bill Cosby, Jay Leno, Paula Poundstone, Bon Jovi. Murphy is the creator of Dr. Rupert Opie. This character is a comic and satirical reflection of pompous television self-help gurus. Murphy founded (The Doctors of Comedy) with Comedian Jeff Applebaum. This bringing volunteer stand-up comedy shows to hospitals and alcohol and drug treatment centers around the U.S. He also performed national tours such as "The Dangerous Comedy Tour" and "Unsafe At Any Speed". In 2009, he was the scriptwriter and performer for a one-man show Buckminster Fuller Live, playing futurist inventor Buckminster Fuller.

He recently produced his second feature film: The Last Dymaxion: Buckminster Fuller's Dream Restored. The film has been written up in the New York Times prompting an October 2011 lecture and screening at Yale University.
