= Rumpler Tropfenwagen =

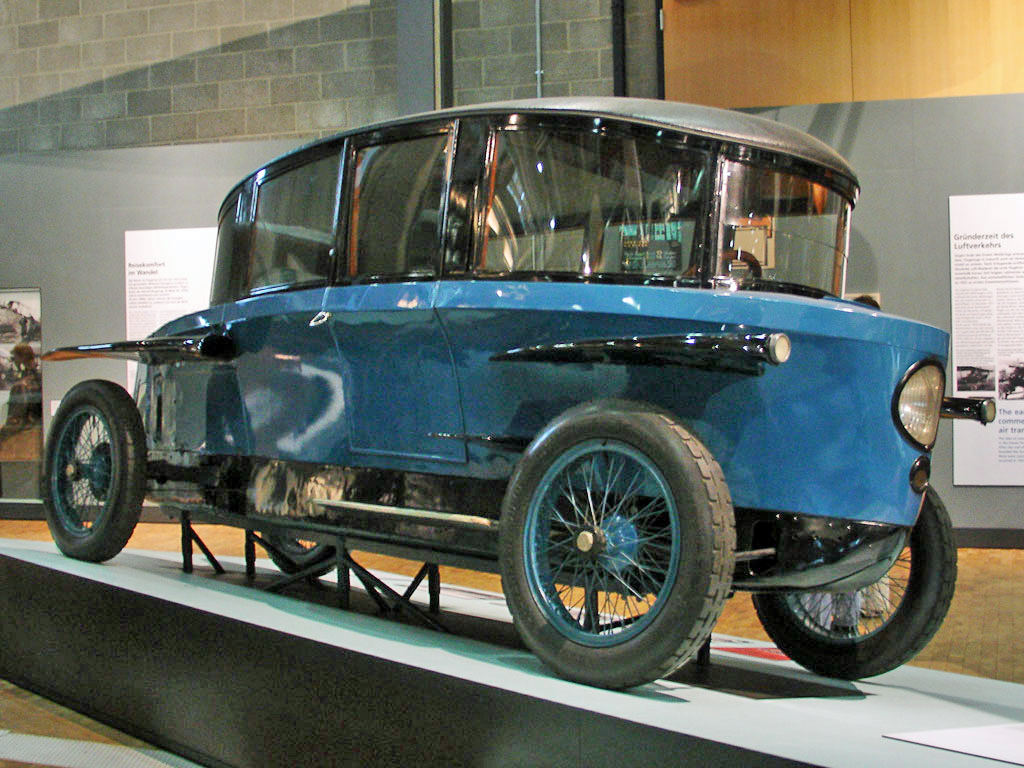
- Rumpler Tropfenwagen on display at Deutsches Technikmuseum Berlin

Overview
- Manufacturer: Rumpler
- Also called: Tropfen-Auto
- Production: 1921–1925
- Designer: Edmund Rumpler

Body and chassis
- Body style: Saloon car
- Layout: RMR layout

Powertrain
- Engine: 2,580 cc (157 cu in) W6 OHV engine
- Transmission: 3-speed manual

The Rumpler Tropfenwagen (lit. 'Rumpler drop car', named after its raindrop shape) was a car developed by Austrian engineer Edmund Rumpler to be streamlined with a very low drag coefficient.

Introduced at the Berlin Motor Show in September 1921 when the AVUS opened, the tall underpowered passenger car was neither suitable for speeding runs on the AVUS circuit, nor was there any Reichsautobahn highway or paved Reichsstraße road network yet on which it could, as Grand tourer, make good use of its low drag.

Designed with two pointed ends, with the driver sitting in center front, and passenger seats at the widest part of the body, it also pioneered Rear mid-engine, rear-wheel-drive layout with a long wheel base. Despite the lack of a luggage compartment the Rumpler cars were mainly used as taxis in Berlin where low drag was no benefit, but easy low entry for passengers was, as there was no drive shaft running through the cabin. Combined with a tall ceiling, the Rumpler taxi predates modern low-floor buses, while windscreen-less Rumpler chassis led to modern race cars, as three Benz RH Tropfenwagen raced in the 1923 Italian Grand Prix.

== The Tropfenwagen ==
=== Aerodynamics ===
Rumpler, born in Vienna, was known as a designer of aircraft when at the 1921 Berlin car show he introduced the Tropfenwagen. It was to be the first streamlined production car, before the Chrysler Airflow and Tatra T77. The Rumpler was already wind tunnel optimized at the Aerodynamics Research Institute in Göttingen and had a drag coefficient of only 0.28, a value that astonished later engineers when they tested the Tropfenwagen in the 1970s. This would be competitive even today. For comparison: the top ten most aerodynamic production cars in 2014/2015 were in the range 0.26 down to 0.19. The Fiat Balilla of the mid-1930s, by contrast, was rated at 0.60. To enable the car's aerodynamic shape, the Tropfenwagen also featured the world's first (single plane) curved windows in a production car. Both the windscreen and the side windows were significantly curved. But Rumpler wasn't the first with the idea of a streamlined car. At least in 1913 Castagna and Alfa Romeo built the prototype Aerodinamica with similar ideas.

=== Engine ===
The car featured a Siemens and Halske-built 2,580 cc (157 cu in) overhead valve W6 engine, with three banks of paired cylinders, all working on a common crankshaft. Producing 27 kW (36 hp), it was mounted just ahead of the rear axle. The engine, transmission, and final drive were assembled together and installed as a unit. The Rumpler-invented rear swing axles were suspended by trailing leaf springs, while the front beam axle was suspended by leading leaf springs.

=== Seating ===
Able to seat four or five, all the passengers were carried between the axles for maximum comfort, while the driver was alone at the front, to maximize view. With the 1923 model, two tip-up seats were added.

=== Performance, models, influence ===
Weighing 1,400 kg (3,086 lb), the Tropfenwagen was nevertheless capable of 110 km/h (70 mph) on its mere 27 kW (36 hp). This performance got the attention of Benz & Cie.'s chief engineer, Hans Nibel. Nibel conceived the Mercedes-Benz Tropfenwagen racers using the virtually unchanged Rumpler chassis. Poor sales and increasing losses led Benz to abandon the project. Later Auto Union racing cars resembled the Benz Tropfenwagen racers and were built in part by Rumpler engineers.

Rumpler made another attempt in 1924, the 4A106, which used a 37 kW (50 hp) 2,614 cc (159.5 cu in) inline 4-cylinder engine. This compelled a growth in wheelbase, with a consequent increase in seating to six or seven.

=== Sales ===
Although the car was very advanced for its time, it sold poorly – about 100 cars were built. Sales were hindered by small problems at the start (cooling, steering), the appearance of the vehicle, and the absence of a luggage compartment. Most were sold as taxis, where easy boarding and the high ceiling were advantages. The last cars were built in 1925.

=== In Metropolis ===
The Tropfenwagen became famous thanks to the film Metropolis, in which Rumplers found a burning end. It also inspired the Mercedes-Benz 130H / 150H / 170H road cars.

=== Surviving specimen ===
Only two examples are known to survive, one in the Verkehrszentrum branch of the Deutsches Museum in Munich, and one in the German Museum of Technology in Berlin.

== See also ==
- Streamliner: Automobiles for overview of early aerodynamic automobiles

Other early teardrop-shaped cars, chronologically

- Persu car (1922–23), designed by Romanian engineer Aurel Persu, who improved on the Tropfenwagen by placing the wheels inside the car body
- Stout Scarab (1932–35, 1946), US
- Dymaxion car (1933), US
- Schlörwagen (1939), German prototype, never produced
