= Rear-engine, front-wheel-drive layout =

Car design where the motor powers the forward axle from behind

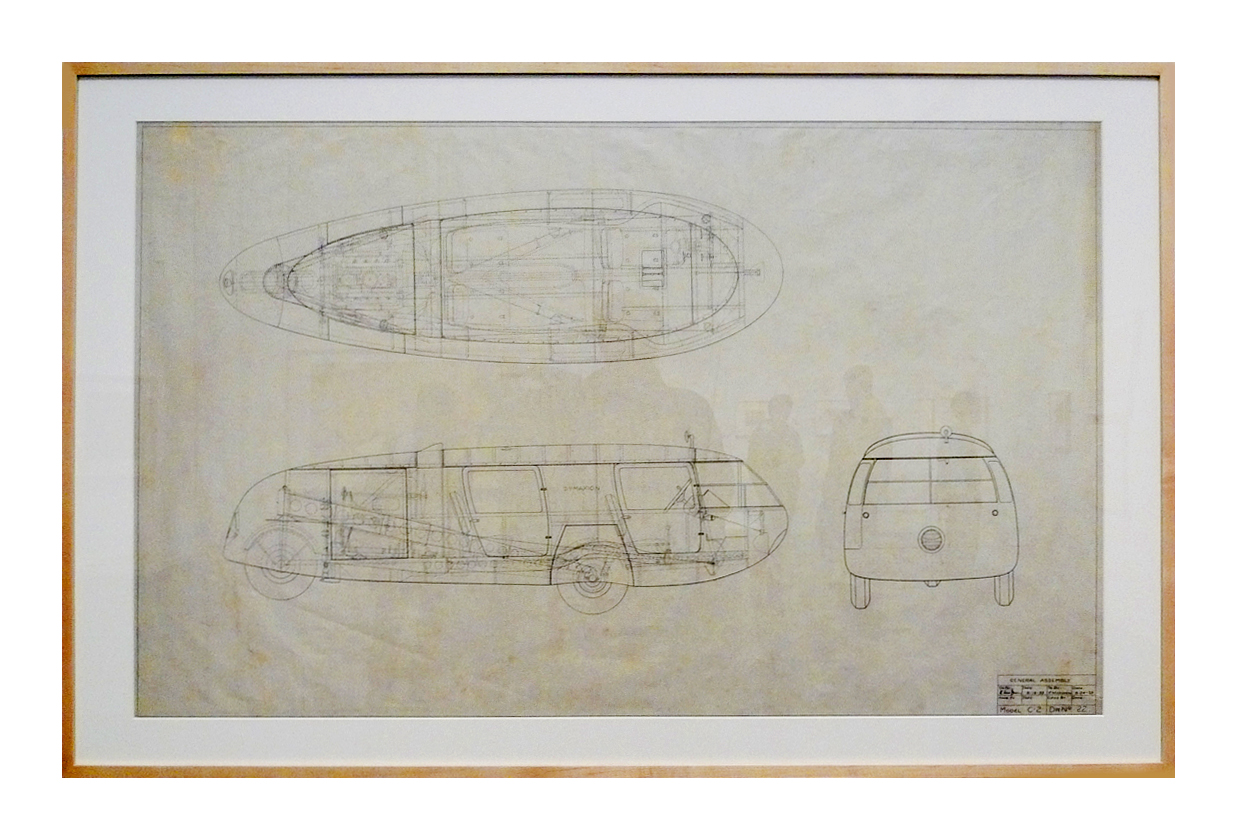
Framed illustration of the Dymaxion car.

A rear-engine, front-wheel-drive layout is one in which the engine is between or behind the rear wheels, and drives the front wheels via a driveshaft, the complete reverse of a conventional front-engine, rear-wheel-drive vehicle layout.

The earliest example of the form appeared in 1932, with the design and construction of the prototype Maroon Car by chief designer Harleigh Holmes at Coleman Motors, an established builder of Front- and All-Wheel-Drive vehicles based in Littleton, Colorado. The car had front-wheel drive and was powered by a rear-mounted V-8 engine. Only one was built and the vehicle was never placed in production.

Since then, it has remained an extremely uncommon drive layout throughout automotive history, used only by a few prototypes and concept cars, such as Buckminster Fuller's 1933 Dymaxion car, which was able to turn within its wheelbase thanks to rear-wheel steering, and the 1947 Gregory Sedan, held at the Lane Motor Museum.

The layout has occasionally seen renewed interest as a potential option for innovative car designs, such as in the 1999 patent application of inventor–engineer Michael Basnett at the former Rover Group, which proposed a front transaxle, rear quasi-flat engine (an inline-4, turned 90 degrees) architecture, with the fuel tank placed where the right-hand cylinder bank would have been in a "true" flat engine; overall somewhat mimicking the "pancake engine" design of the Volkswagen Type 3 but in water-cooled form and without rear drive.

According to the patent, the layout is designed to be advantageous in terms of crash performance by increasing the front crumple zone, in allowing greater styling freedom, in enhanced ride via reduced noise, vibration, and harshness, and in lowered center of gravity providing improved handling, braking and roll characteristics—as well as, much like the Type 3, increased cabin and cargo space within the same chassis footprint and body height. Its main disadvantage is the lack of weight over the drive wheels, particularly under hard acceleration as weight shifts to the rear.

However, as mentioned in a Jalopnik article listing all known RF-layout cars, it too appears to have been nothing more than a speculative exercise, without so much as a single physical prototype being built—and the point of whether Rover Group intended to develop it any further is moot, as the corporation was broken up and its assets sold off barely a year later, with the fate of that particular piece of IP being unclear.

The drivetrain design closest to RF in actual series production vehicles is the mid-engine, four-wheel-drive layout, typically seen in high end sportscar designs, and which, with the use of power-split centre differentials or hybrid drive systems, can be set up to send a variable amount of the total drive to the front wheels, in some cases up to 100%. Electric front-wheel-drive vehicles can also be found with small range-extender motor-generators, which are typically mounted in the rear luggage compartment, but do not technically count as RF drivetrain as there is no direct mechanical link between engine and wheels, or even the generated engine power and drive motor output, as the generator tends to run at a constant speed and is used to maintain battery charge rather than power the motor directly.
