= Swing axle =

Simple type of independent suspension

Swing axle suspension characteristics: camber change on bumps, "jacking" on rebound

A swing axle is a simple type of independent suspension for the rear axle of rear wheel drive vehicles. Designed and patented by Edmund Rumpler in 1903, the then revolutionary invention in automotive suspension allowed powered wheels to follow uneven road surfaces independently. Along with better road contact and holding, each wheel's unsprung weight contributed to improved vehicle handling. The first automotive application was the Rumpler Tropfenwagen; another early example was the 1923 Tatra 11, later followed by the Mercedes 130H/150H/170H, the Standard Superior, the Volkswagen Type 1 Beetle and most of its derivatives, the Chevrolet Corvair, and the roll-over prone M151 jeep amongst others.

Many later automobile rear swing axles have universal joints connecting the driveshafts to the differential, which is attached to the chassis. Swing axles do not have universal joints at the wheels — the wheels are always perpendicular to the driveshafts; the design is therefore not suitable for a car's front wheels, which require steering motion. Nevertheless, a simplified variant, wherein the differential remained fixed to one of the halfshafts, was offered optionally on the 1963 Jeep Wagoneer's front axle, upon its market introduction.

Swing axle suspensions often used leaf springs and shock absorbers, though later Mercedes-Benz applications used coil springs and the VW beetle swing axle was torsion bar sprung.

One problem inherent in the swing axle concept is that it almost inevitably results in a very high roll centre which causes detrimental jacking effects and camber change when cornering and lateral cornering forces are applied. Its simple geometry limits design freedom to a great extent.

Swing axles can also be used as a low cost and durable independent suspension solution for non-driven front or rear axles, the Tatra 17 which had swing axles front and rear being an early example. It was also used in early aircraft (1910 or before), such as the Sopwith and Fokker, usually with rubber bungee and no damping.

== Comparison ==
=== Advantage ===
The swing axle suspension has two advantages over the typical live axle:

- It reduced unsprung weight since the differential is mounted to the chassis
- It eliminates sympathetic camber changes on opposite wheels

=== Shortcomings ===
- A great amount of single-wheel camber change is experienced relative to beam axle designs, since the radius of the jointed half-shaft is less than half that of the whole axle assembly.
- "Jacking" on suspension unloading (or rebound) causes positive camber changes on both sides, which (In extreme cases) can overturn the car.
- Change in camber due to cornering forces can cause loss of rear-wheel adhesion leading to oversteer—a dynamically unstable condition that can cause a vehicle to spin. This is an especially severe problem when a swing axle is used in a rear-engine design, because of the greater side-g forces on the rear wheels from the mass of the engine. Camber changes during deceleration can increase the severity of lift-off oversteer.

1964 Corvair swing-axle rear suspension with transverse leaf spring

=== Solutions ===
Several engineering options can limit swing axle handling problems, with varying success:

- Anti-roll bar: As a design option, a front anti-roll bar which can ameliorate the swing axle car's handling—shifting weight transfer to the front outboard tyre, considerably reducing rear slip angles—thereby avoiding potential oversteer.
- Single-pivot point: Mercedes-Benz addressed the handling issues by producing swing axles with a single-pivot point located under the differential, thus well below the axle. This configuration markedly reduced the tendency to "jack-up" and the later low pivot swing-axle equipped cars were praised in contemporary publications for their handling. The low-pivot swing-axle remained in production with Mercedes-Benz W108/W109 280SE and 300SEL until 1972. It was fitted to the 300SEL 6.3, which was during the early 1970s the world's fastest production sedan. AMG-modified 6.3s were also raced with the stock swing axle.
- Tyre pressure differential: The Renault Dauphine, Volkswagen Beetle and first generation Chevrolet Corvair (1960–1964) used a tyre pressure differential strategy to eliminate oversteer characteristics of their swing axle suspensions—specifically low front and high rear tyre pressure—which induced understeer. The tyre pressure differential strategy offered a significant disadvantage: owners and mechanics could inadvertently but easily re-introduce oversteer characteristics by over-inflating the front tyres (that is, to typical pressures for other cars with other suspension systems) or by inflating all four tyres to the same pressure. The effectiveness of this option was criticized in lawsuits in the US during the 1960s.
- Z-bar and roll-inducing springs: Mercedes-Benz introduced, to help their low-pivot swing-axle, a coil spring mounted transversely above the differential, which would transfer load from one side to the other, so as to force down one wheel when the other side went up. This coil spring increases the load bearing capacity of the rear suspension, so a new lower pressure set of springs was substituted for the usual ones to maintain ride suppleness. A similar effect was achieved by VW's Z-bar, as opposed to anti-roll bar. Both devices distribute the response of the rear axles to input on one wheel, thus reducing the tendency for excessive camber to occur on one wheel. These solutions represent a compromise between swing axle and beam axle characteristics, at the cost of decreasing ride quality.
- Camber compensator: A transverse leaf spring is connected to the outer ends of the half-shafts and below the suspension assembly, resisting positive camber that could result from cornering forces or rebound. This was a successful solution introduced on the 1964 Corvair, and also factory-installed on Porsche 356 Super 90s and some later models. Aftermarket camber compensators are available for Porsche, VW and early Corvairs.

== Safety ==
Ralph Nader in his 1965 book Unsafe at Any Speed detailed accidents and lawsuits related to the shortcomings in 1960–1963 models of the first generation Chevrolet Corvair's swing-axle design. Nader identified a Chevrolet engineer who had fought management after the management had eliminated a front anti-roll bar for cost reasons. The 1964 models were fitted with a front anti-roll bar as standard equipment, in addition to a rear transverse leaf spring, thus improving stability during emergency maneuvering. Second-generation Corvairs (1965–1969) used a true independent rear suspension (IRS) system.

The Hillman Imp designers learned from the problems with the Corvair, having crashed one at a relatively low speed, and they designed their rear-engined car with a semi-trailing arm suspension at the rear. To attain correct handling balance, they actually used swing-axle geometry at the front, with the steering pivots mounted at the outer ends of single swing wishbones. These caused too much understeer and uneven tyre wear, and modifications were made to reduce the positive camber of the front wheels by lowering the swing-axle pivot points. Aftermarket kits were also available to do this, and an inexpensive alternative was to insert a tapered shim to change the inclination of the kingpin carrier relative to the wishbone.

== Replacement ==
Swing axles were supplanted in general use by de Dion tube axles in the late 1960s, though live axles remained the most common. Most rear suspensions have been replaced by more modern independent suspensions in recent years, and both swing and de Dion types are virtually unused today.

One exception is the Czech truck manufacturer Tatra, which has been using swing axles on a central 'backbone' tube since 1923 (model Tatra 11) instead of more common solid axles. This system is claimed to give greater rigidity and better performance on poor quality roads and off-road. There the inherent reduced stability on roads is compensated by an increased stability on rough terrain, allowing for higher off-road speeds, all else being equal. This is especially manifested in long 6+ wheel vehicles where off-road chassis twisting can be a major issue.

== Twin I-Beam ==
Twin I-Beam diagram; each lower control arm is attached to the opposite side of the vehicle (F)rame, so the arc described by the suspension travel of the (L)eft lower control arm, for example, results in less camber change than if the (L)eft lower control arm was attached to the left side of the (F)rame

Another use of the swing axle concept is Ford's "Twin I-Beam" front suspension for trucks. This system has solid axles, and may transmit power in four-wheel-drive versions, where it is called "Twin Traction Beam". It is an independent suspension system, as each tyre rises and falls without affecting the position of the other. Although each tyre still moves in an arc as in a standard swing-axle suspension, the lower control arms are effectively lengthened by attaching the axle pivot point to the bottom of the opposite frame rail (i.e., the left lower control arm pivots on the right frame rail and vice versa). The lowered pivot point and longer arm length reduce the change in camber and the effect is far less hazardous than powered swing axles for the rear wheels listed above, where the pivot point is approximately on the same side frame rail. The Twin I-Beam suspension includes an additional radius arm link on each side to control caster.

Although the camber change is reduced with the Twin I-Beam suspension, the A-arm suspension system constrains the wheel into a parallelogram motion, further minimizing camber changes throughout suspension travel.

The 1956 Series 1 Lotus Eleven sports racers used a swing-axle front suspension, derived from the Ford E93 sedan.
