= Dymaxion car =

Vehicle designed by Buckminster Fuller

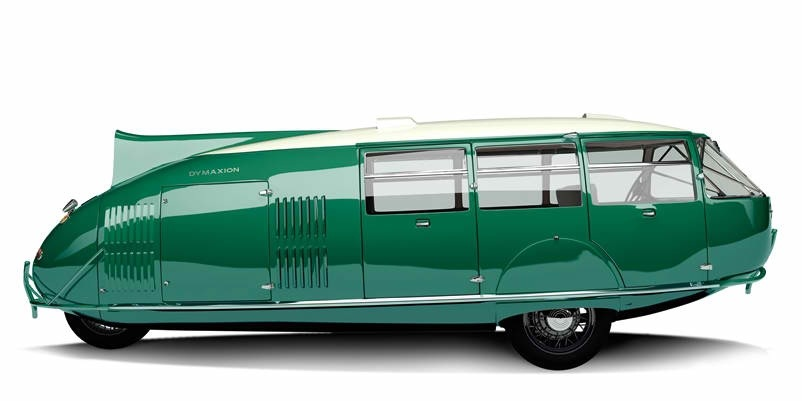
- Dymaxion replica (2010)

Overview
- Manufacturer: The Dymaxion Corporation; Bridgeport, Connecticut
- Also called: 4D Transport
- Production: 1933 three prototypes built
- Assembly: Bridgeport, Connecticut
- Designer: Buckminster Fuller with Starling Burgess and Isamu Noguchi

Body and chassis
- Class: Concept car
- Body style: Sheet aluminum on ash frame
- Layout: Rear-engine, front-wheel-drive
- Platform: Varied per prototype: double or triple hinged, cromoly steel

Powertrain
- Engine: Ford flathead V8
- Transmission: Ford

Dimensions
- Length: 20 ft (6,096.0 mm)

The Omni-Media-Transport

With such a vehicle at our disposal, [Fuller] felt that human travel, like that of birds, would no longer be confined to airports, roads, and other bureaucratic boundaries, and that autonomous free-thinking human beings could live and prosper wherever they chose.

— Lloyd S. Sieden, Bucky Fuller's Universe, 2000
To his young daughter Allegra

Fuller described the Dymaxion as a "zoomobile", explaining that it could hop off the road at will, fly about, then, as deftly as a bird, settle back into a place in traffic.

— R. (Richard) Buckminster Fuller 1895–1983

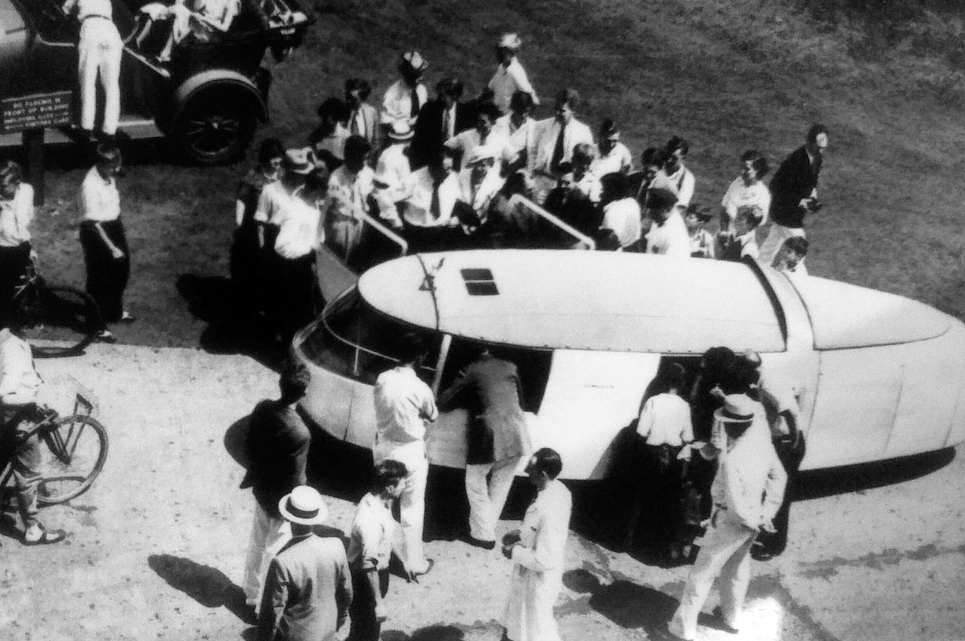
The Dymaxion car, c. 1933, artist Diego Rivera shown entering the car, carrying coat

The Dymaxion car was designed by American inventor Buckminster Fuller during the Great Depression and featured prominently at Chicago's 1933/1934 World's Fair. Fuller built three experimental prototypes with naval architect Starling Burgess – using donated money as well as a family inheritance – to explore not an automobile per se, but the 'ground-taxiing phase' of a vehicle that might one day be designed to fly, land and drive – an "Omni-Medium Transport". Fuller associated the word Dymaxion with much of his work, a portmanteau of the words dynamic, maximum, and tension, to summarize his goal to do more with less. It could hold 11 passengers, reach speeds of up to 90 mph (140 km/h), and had a fuel economy of 30 mpg_{‑US} (8 L/100 km; 36 mpg_{‑imp}).

The Dymaxion's aerodynamic bodywork was designed for increased fuel efficiency and top speed, and its platform featured a lightweight hinged chassis, rear-mounted V8 engine, front-wheel drive (a rare RF layout), and three wheels. With steering via its third wheel at the rear (capable of 90° steering lock), the vehicle could steer itself in a tight circle, often causing a sensation. Fuller noted severe limitations in its handling, especially at high speed or in high wind, due to its rear-wheel steering (highly unsuitable for anything but low speeds) and the limited understanding of the effects of lift and turbulence on automobile bodies in that era – allowing only trained staff to drive the car and saying it "was an invention that could not be made available to the general public without considerable improvements." Shortly after its launch, a prototype crashed and killed the Dymaxion's driver.

Despite courting publicity and the interest of auto manufacturers, Fuller used his inheritance to finish the second and third prototypes, selling all three, dissolving Dymaxion Corporation and reiterating that the Dymaxion was never intended as a commercial venture. One of the three original prototypes survives, and two semi-faithful replicas have recently been constructed. The Dymaxion was included in the 2009 book Fifty Cars That Changed The World and was the subject of the 2012 documentary The Last Dymaxion.

In 2008, The New York Times said Fuller "saw the Dymaxion, as he saw much of the world, as a kind of provisional prototype, a mere sketch, of the glorious, eventual future."

== History ==
Fuller would ultimately go on to fully develop his Comprehensive Anticipatory Design Science, his theory of using all technology on behalf of all people as soon as possible, but by this point it was "his job, Fuller decided, to identify a problem, develop a way to solve it, and wait – perhaps as long as twenty-five years – for public awareness to catch up."

In 1930, Fuller had purchased an architectural magazine, T-Square, which he ultimately renamed Shelter. Fuller edited the magazine anonymously for two years, and in 1928 published sketches of his land-air-water vehicle, called a 4D Transport. 4D stood for Four Dimensional, a term used in physics and mathematics, referring to length, width, depth and time.

Regarding the 4D transport, author Lloyd S. Sieden, wrote in his 2000 book Bucky Fuller's Universe:

With such a vehicle at our disposal, [Fuller] felt that human travel, like that of birds, would no longer be confined to airports, roads, and other bureaucratic boundaries, and that autonomous free-thinking human beings could live and prosper wherever they chose.

To his daughter, Allegra, he described the Dymaxion as:

A "zoomobile", explaining that it could hop off the road at will, fly about, then, as deftly as a bird, settle back into a place in traffic.

Fuller was offered $5,000 (2023: $119,500) from wealthy former stock trader and socialite Philip (variously reported as Phillip) Pearson and his wife Temple Pearson (niece of Isadora Duncan) of Philadelphia. Pearson was a stock broker and had presciently sold short a large quantity of stock before the Great Depression, becoming instantly wealthy. Pearson had known of Fuller's studies, had more wealth than he needed, and felt he could put Fuller and others to work in a way that would also do something to alleviate unemployment.

The Dymaxion Corporation factory at the defunct Locomobile dynamometer building, Tongue Pointe, Bridgeport, Connecticut

Fuller initially refused his benefactor, concerned about potential profit motives and short-sightedness. Fuller devised a contract, adding what he "often referred to as the 'ice-cream-soda clause'", of which he said: "If I want to use all of [the donated money] to buy ice cream cones, that will be that, and there will be no questions asked."

On March 4, 1933 – as President Roosevelt instituted a banking moratorium, Fuller formed Dymaxion Corporation, set up a workshop in the former dynamometer building of the defunct Locomobile Company at Tongue Point, on the west side of the harbor in Bridgeport, Connecticut, and hired naval architect Starling Burgess and a team of 27 workmen, including former Rolls-Royce mechanics. Over 1000 workmen had applied for the 27 jobs. The first of three prototypes was completed in three months – on Fuller's 38th birthday, July 12, 1933.

On October 18, 1933, Fuller filed a patent, which was granted in 1937.

- Dymaxion Corporation location: 41°10′02.1″N 73°10′49.1″W)
- Note: Blueprints of the Dymaxion carried the name of the company as the 4D Company,
  Signage on the Tongue Pointe, former Locomobile building read 4D Dymaxion.

== Design ==
Because Fuller was aiming for what he called Omni Medium Transport, a vehicle that could go anywhere, the Dymaxion would ultimately have "wheels for ground travel and jet stilts for instant takeoff and flight." Jet stilts were Fuller's placeholder idea for a future technology that could provide compact, concentrated lift — twenty years before the commercial availability of jets.

Estimating that designing a land–sea–air vehicle was then financially and technically out of reach, Fuller focused on the most dangerous and challenging mode of such vehicle: landing and taxiing on hard ground.

Fuller favored front-wheel drive, studying the way a wheelbarrow could more effectively pull its load rather than pitch forward when pushing a load. He began studies of the relationships between vehicles (cars, trucks – and also birds and fish) with the media in which they operated (fluid dynamics) – as well as steering mechanisms in nature, especially the rear "single fin" steering of birds and fish. Burgess, inventor of the first delta-wing aircraft, was invaluable to the project – but skeptical the vehicle would ever fly.

Fuller theorized that getting a long, aerodynamic 'plane' fuselage – which was also inclined to have trailing, rear steering – to land safely and not immediately turn into the wind, would be a major challenge. The vehicle would inherently exhibit something he called "ground-loopiness," and chose to focus his energy there. Although it was never intended as such, Fuller anticipated the public would instinctively call such a vehicle an automobile, and when licensing to drive the vehicle on Connecticut roads, acquiesced and applied for an automobile registration.

Fuller had worked with sculptor Isamu Noguchi to create plaster wind tunnel models of the Dymaxion to help determine its teardrop shape. Authors of a 2011 detailed computational fluid dynamics (CFD) analysis at Coventry University of the Dymaxion bodywork noted the form's "similarity in shape to a humpback whale" and concluded "the Dymaxion car looks close to a drag optimum style and serves as a useful reference for low drag forms."

== Prototypes One, Two and Three ==
- Prototype One, at 20 feet (6.1 m) long, was built on a hinged two-frame chassis constructed of lightweight chromoly steel with aircraft-type dished lightening holes – and powered by a Ford V8 engine producing 85 brake horsepower (63 kW; 86 PS) in a rear-engine, front-wheel-drive layout. The front axle was a re-purposed and inverted (the flipped axle must be inverted to prevent the pinion gears from running the wrong way) rear axle from a contemporary Ford roadster. Tires were provided by Goodyear. The suspension used leaf springs "turned sideways" (transverse leaf springs) and bodywork featured sheet aluminum over an ash wood frame, with a roof partially constructed of snap-on painted canvas. Original blueprints indicate seating for four, including the driver. Fuller said he had achieved fuel economy of 36 mpg (7.8L/100 km) and to have reached a speed of 206 km/h (128 mph). Jeff Lane, founder of the Lane Motor Museum and owner of a Dymaxion Car replica, estimates the true top speed at 80–85 mph (129–137 km/h), further limited in practice by engine performance and poor handling; his replica only achieved less than half the fuel economy claimed by Fuller, as well.
- Prototypes Two and Three featured developmental improvements including a lighter three-frame chassis central periscope providing rearward vision, larger side windows, recessed headlights and a roof-mounted stabilizer with rear-facing exhaust outlet.

Videos: In contemporary videos (see External links, below), Fuller is seen driving the vehicle at high speed. Another shows Fuller showing off his speeding ticket, demonstrating its ability to turn "on itself", easily parallel parking in a space only six inches longer than the car, remarking that he averaged over 22 mpg (up to 30 mpg), and commenting on its stability, with a center of gravity both low and ahead of the midpoint of its wheelbase.

== Later prototype history ==
- Prototype One was badly damaged in the noted car crash at the time of the 1933 Chicago Century of Progress fair. The car was repaired and sold to the director of the automotive division of the U.S. Bureau of Standards (BoS), only to be subsequently destroyed in a fire at the Washington D.C. garage of the BoS.

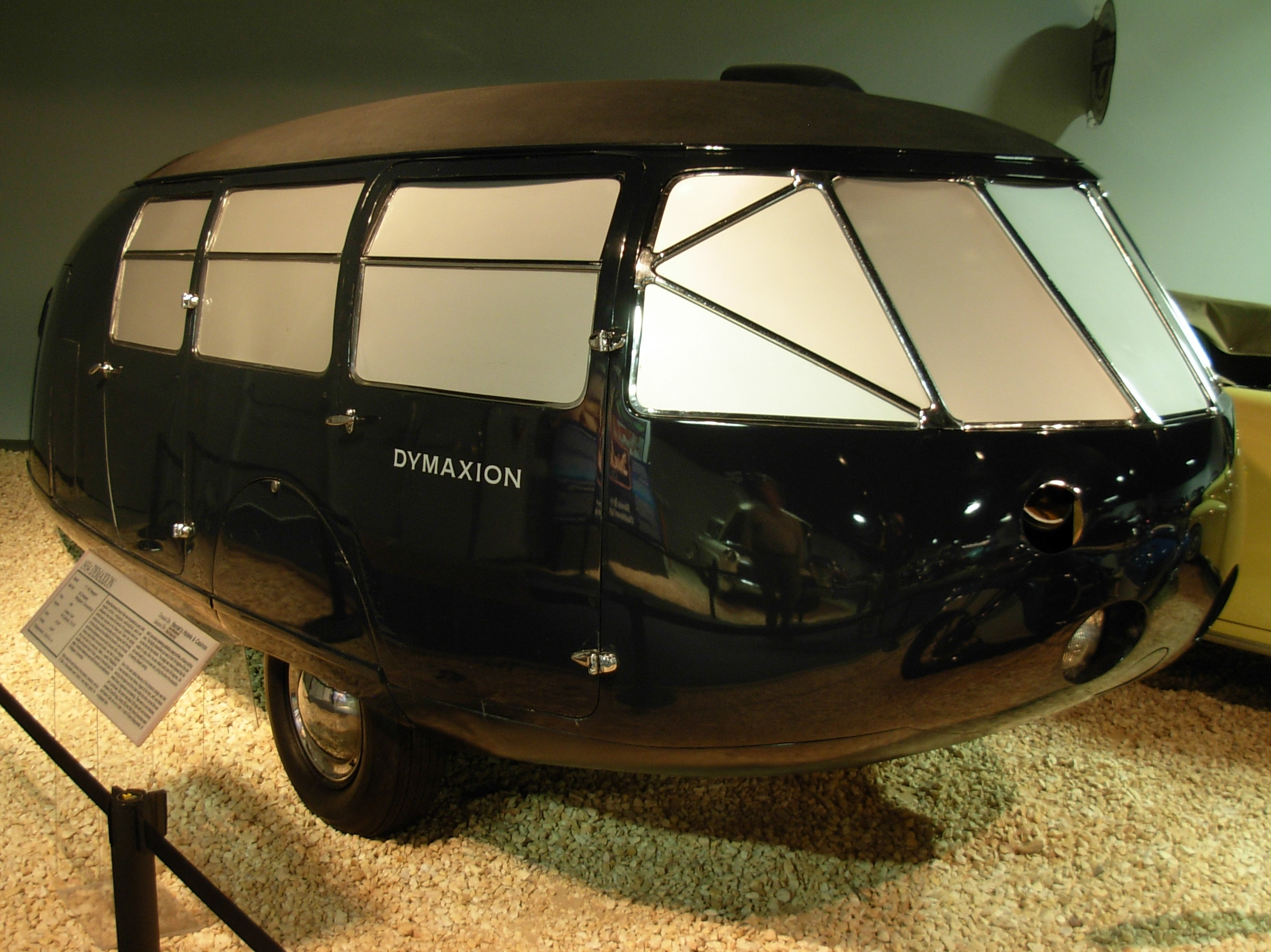
The Dymaxion Prototype Two on display at the National Automobile Museum in Reno, Nevada (2007)

- Prototype Two survives in the Harrah Collection of the National Automobile Museum in Reno, Nevada. Prototype Two was initially purchased by Alfred Williams, manager of the Gulf Refining Company and driven cross country in a nationwide advertising promotion of aircraft fuel. In a contemporary video (see External links, below), Fuller notes that good friend Amelia Earhart asked that the Dymaxion be her official car for the celebration of her receiving the National Gold Medal from National Geographic. Dymaxion Prototype Two was driven to Washington and garnered considerable publicity.
- Prototype Three changed hands many times but was lost, presumed scrapped, in the 1950s. Once owned by Leopold Stokowski, it was estimated to have been driven 300,000 miles.

In 1934, Noguchi drove a completed Dymaxion on an extended road trip through Connecticut with Clare Boothe Luce and Dorothy Hale, stopping to see Thornton Wilder in Hamden, Connecticut, before driving to Hartford for the out-of-town opening of Gertrude Stein's and Virgil Thomson's Four Saints in Three Acts.

One of the prototypes was driven extensively in a campaign to raise funds in support of the Allies in WW II.

== Handling limitations ==
Everything in the Universe is always moving in the direction of least resistance. When what we call a light plane, one flown by an individual, lands crosswind, its fairing or streamlining makes it want to turn violently in the direction of the wind – the direction of least resistance. This is called ground looping. I realized that the most difficult conditions for my omni-medium jet-stilt superbly faired flying device would be when it was on the ground. What is popularly called the Dymaxion Car were the first three vehicles designed to test ground taxiing under transverse wind conditions.

— Bucky Fuller, Inventions: The Patented Works of R. Buckminster Fuller, 1983

Fuller and Burgess realized early that the Dymaxion concept would present considerable challenges. As anticipated, and in line with the purpose of the exploration, maneuvering in high winds proved problematic, with the vehicle having a strong tendency to turn into the wind. Steering difficulty and lift at the rear of the vehicle were also observed.

Fuller realized the Dymaxion "was an invention that could not be made available to the general public without considerable improvements," and instituted a program of constant refinement and improvement to the platform.

Because of its limitations, Fuller and Burgess limited driving to a list of trained drivers and restricted use in high winds or inclement weather.

== Speed record ==
Soon after launching Prototype One, Fuller was invited to exhibit the Dymaxion at a Bronx race track, beating the track record by 50% and drawing attention because it did not slide or drift across the track like the other race cars.

== Crashes ==
A highly publicized crash in Prototype One on October 27, 1933, occurred "virtually at the entrance to the Chicago Century of Progress World's Fair." The Dymaxion rolled over during the crash, killing its driver, Gulf employee Francis T. Turner, and seriously injuring its passengers: aviation pioneer (and noted spy) William Sempill and Charles Dollfuss, curator of France's first air museum.

The cause of the crash is disputed. A coroner's inquest did not ascribe fault for the accident, stating that it involved a collision with a car driven by a shoe salesman named Meyer Roth (Fuller erroneously identified Roth as a highly placed Chicago Parks commissioner). When Fuller learned that another car was involved, he placed the blame for the incident entirely on Roth. Eyewitnesses, however, stated that Roth's vehicle struck the Dymaxion only after it had begun to roll over.

Fuller, who was not present at the accident, provided his version of events in a book he wrote in collaboration with Robert Marks on the Dymaxion; this account was repeated in Lloyd Steven Sieden's book on Fuller. They stated that the two vehicles were traveling at 70 mph, with Turner trying to evade the politician's car. The inquest showed, they argued, that the design of the Dymaxion was not a factor in the crash. The politician's car, they further claimed, was quickly and illegally removed from the scene of the crash before reporters arrived. Turner was wearing a seatbelt but was killed when the canvas-covered roof framing collapsed. Dollfuss was not wearing a seatbelt, was ejected and landed nearby on his feet. Sempill was severely injured and took months to recover before he could testify at the subsequent inquest. The Dymaxion itself had rolled over and was badly damaged but was subsequently repaired by Fuller and Burgess.

In the press, no mention was made that the Dymaxion had been involved in a two-car crash. Instead, the cause of the crash was attributed to the car's unconventional configuration: headlines in New York and Chicago read, "Freak car rolls over – killing famous driver – injuring international passengers".

Fuller himself would later crash Prototype Two, with his only surviving daughter, Allegra (Allegra Fuller Snyder), aboard.

== Auto industry ==
Fuller received interest from Walter Chrysler, Henry Ford, and Henry Kaiser as well as companies including Packard, Studebaker and Curtiss-Wright.

Chrysler said Fuller had "produced exactly the car [he, himself, had] always wanted to produce", when his company had set out to design a highly advanced, aerodynamic car, the Airflow, which Walter Chrysler ultimately found inferior. Chrysler commissioned Fuller to study the development of the Airflow, finding that Fuller had used one quarter the money and a third the time to make his prototype.

At various points, it appeared that several manufacturers were interested in marketing the Dymaxion. Walter Chrysler was interested, although he advised Fuller that such an advanced design would meet considerable resistance, and would make every used car on the road obsolete, threatening the wholesale dealer distribution and finance network. In his 1988 book, The Age of Heretics, author Art Kleiner said bankers had threatened to recall their loans, feeling the car would destroy sales for second-hand cars and for vehicles already in distribution channels.

== Replicas ==
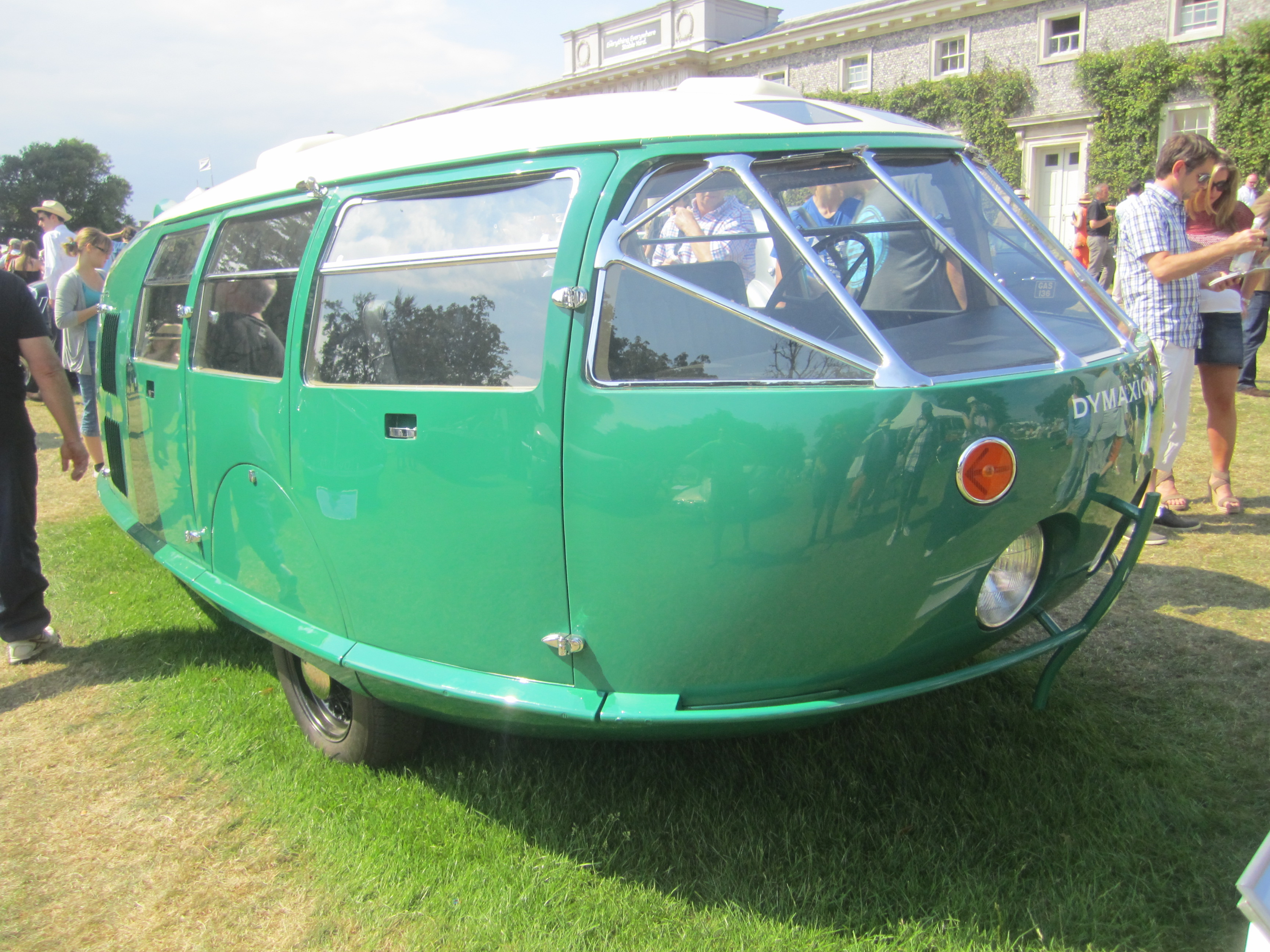
2010 replica of 1933 Dymaxion, by Norman Foster

Hemmings Motor News cites two "faithful or semi-faithful" replicas:

- The Foster Dymaxion Replica was built in October 2010, by architect and student of Buckminster Fuller, Sir Norman Foster in cooperation with vintage racing restoration company Crosthwaite & Gardiner. Foster's team conducted extensive research to replicate its interior, which had completely deteriorated on the only surviving prototype and had not been well documented. Foster was able to borrow Prototype Two under the condition he would also restore its interior. Prototype Two was shipped to the U.K. in order for the work to be carried out before returning to the National Automobile Museum in Reno, Nevada.
- The Lane Dymaxion Replica was commissioned by the Lane Motor Museum in Nashville, Tennessee, and built by craftsmen in Pennsylvania (chassis) and the Czech Republic (bodywork). After driving the Lane replica in 2015, automotive journalists Jamie Kitman and Dan Neil described it as having very poor stability and vehicle control.

== See also ==
- Streamliner: Automobiles for overview of early aerodynamic automobiles
- Flying cars

Early "teardrop" cars, chronologically

- Rumpler Tropfenwagen (1921), first aerodynamic "teardrop" car to be designed and serially produced (about 100 units built)
- Persu car (1922–1923), designed by Romanian engineer Aurel Persu, improved on the Tropfenwagen by placing the wheels inside the car body
- Stout Scarab (1932–1935, 1946), US
- Schlörwagen (1939), German prototype, never produced
