= Edmund Rumpler =

Austrian automobile and aircraft designer (1872–1940)

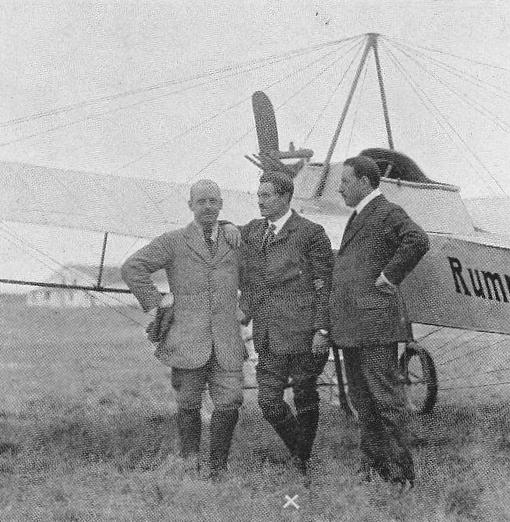
Hellmuth Hirth (center) and Rumpler (right) in 1911

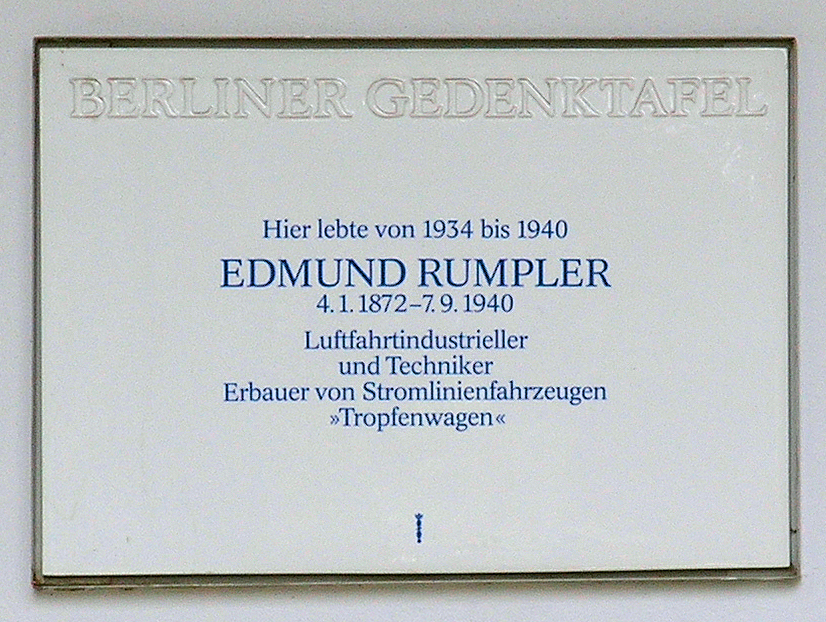
Memorial plaque in Berlin

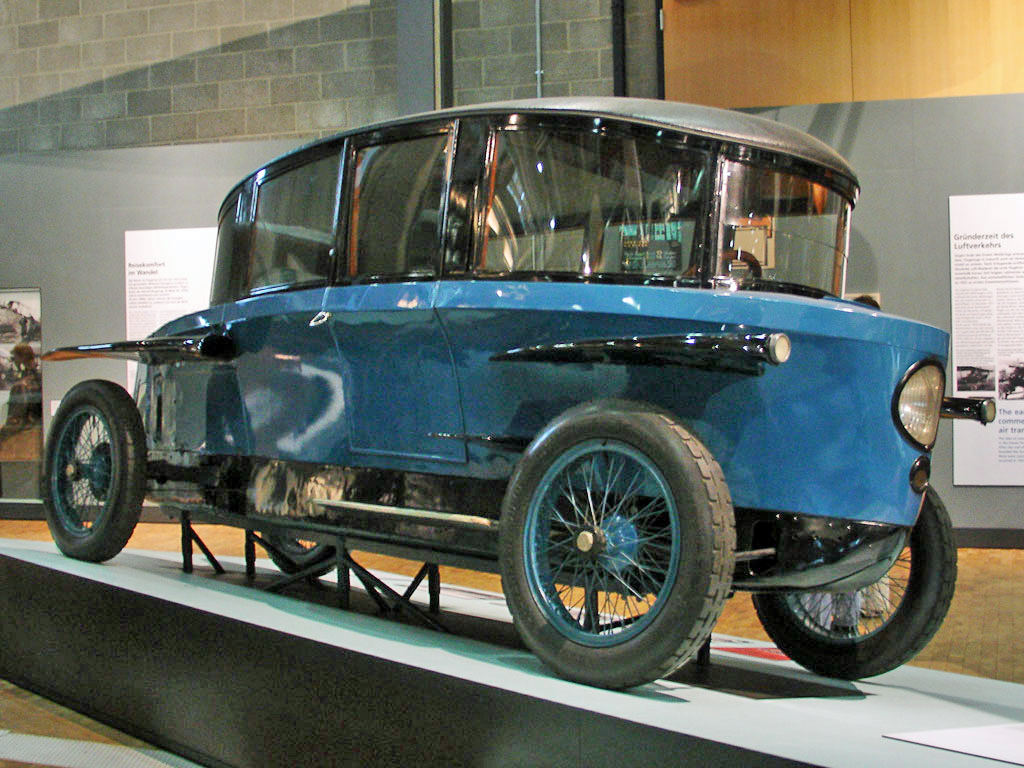
Tropfenwagen

Edmund Elias Rumpler (4 January 1872 – 7 September 1940) was an Austrian automobile and aircraft designer.

Born in Vienna, then Austro-Hungarian Empire (now Austria), he worked mainly in Germany. An automotive engineer by training, he collaborated with Hans Ledwinka on the first Tatra car (at that time called Nesselsdorfer-Wagenbau), the Präsident, in 1897.

By age 30, in 1902, he had quit Daimler to become technical director of Adler. He designed the first German engine to have engine and gearbox as a unit at Adler. The next year, he patented a swing axle rear suspension system (an idea later adopted by Ferdinand Porsche for the KdF Wagen and Porsche 356, as well as by Chevrolet for the Corvair).

The Wright brothers turned Rumpler's attention to aviation. He quit Adler in 1907, and in 1910, copying countryman Igo Etrich's Taube, Rumpler became the first ever aircraft manufacturer in Germany. In 1911, he took on Melli Beese as a student pilot and used her flying appearances in competitions as promotion for his aeroplanes.

Rumpler continued to be interested in automobiles, and after the First World War, he applied aircraft streamlining to a car, building the Tropfenwagen (German, "drop car") in Berlin. A production model proved a sensation at the 1921 Berlin Auto Show. Rumpler's efforts produced a car with an astoundingly low C_{w} of only 0.28 (when tested in 1979); the Fiat Balilla of the period, by contrast, was 0.60.

The Rumpler design inspired the 1923 Benz Tropfenwagen (which used the virtually-unchanged Rumpler chassis) and Auto Union (also built in part by Rumpler engineers) Grand Prix racers.

Rumpler's Tropfenwagen was not a commercial success, and only 100 Tropfenwagen were built, just two of which survive. Rumpler returned to aircraft.

Because Rumpler was Jewish, he was imprisoned after Adolf Hitler took power in 1933, and his career was ruined, even though he was soon released. He died in Züsow Germany in 1940, and the Nazis destroyed his records.

== See also ==
- Notable owners of Tatra 77; Rumpler was one of them.

== Sources ==
- Lyons, Pete. "10 Best Ahead-of-Their-Time Machines". Car and Driver, 1/88, pp. 73–4.
- Setright, L. J. K. "Aerodynamics: Finding the Right Shape for the Car Body", in Northey, Tom, ed. World of Automobiles (London: Orbis, 1974), Vol. 1, p. 38.
- Wise, David Burgess. "Rumpler: One Aeroplane which Never Flew", in Northey, Tom, ed. World of Automobiles (London: Orbis, 1974), Vol. 17, p. 1964.
