= Berlin Motor Show =

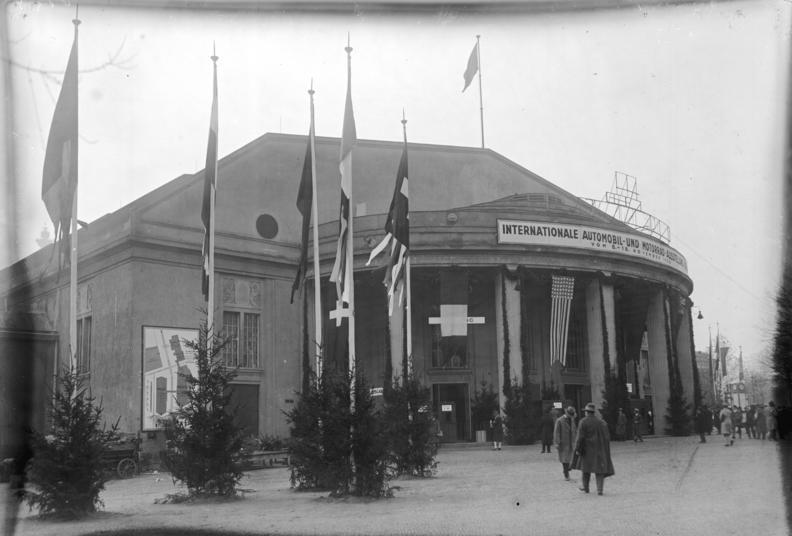
- Exhibition hall, 1926
- Status: Inactive
- Genre: Motor show
- Venue: Messe Berlin
- Location: Berlin
- Country: Germany
- Inaugurated: 1897-1939 (Internationale Automobil-Ausstellung); 1978–2000 (Autos, Avus, Attrkationen)
- Most recent: 2000 (2002 planned, but cancelled)
- Website: www.aaa-berlin.de

The Berlin Motor Show originally started in 1897 in the German capital Berlin as the home of the International Motor Show (Internationale Automobil-Ausstellung, IAA) and ran until 1939. From 1951 the IAA became established in Frankfurt.

A new bi-annual Motor Show, called Autos, Avus, Attraktionen (AAA), was established by the Messe Berlin company in 1978. The last show was held in 2000, with the 2002 show cancelled four months prior to the expected 2002 exhibition.

== History ==
On 30 September 1897, the first IAA was held by the Mitteleuropäischer Motorwagenverein ("Central European Motor Vehicle Association") at the Hotel Bristol on the Unter den Linden boulevard in Berlin. A total of eight Benz Velo, Lutzmann, Kühlstein, and Daimler motor vehicles were on display. A second motor show was held in 1898 at the exhibition grounds near Lehrter Bahnhof. In 1899, more than 100 exhibitors participated in the third motor show .

As the automobile became more known and accepted, the IAA became a fixed event in Germany, with at least one held every year, usually in Berlin. In 1902 the show was held for the first time by the Association of German Automotive Industrialists (Verein Deutscher Motorfahrzeug-Industrieller) at Berlin Friedrichstraße station. The 7th exhibition in 1905 was inaugurated by Emperor Wilhelm II and until 1907, there were even two shows per year, as production had increased to an industrial level. In the next years the show was suspended, due to the outbreak of World War I.

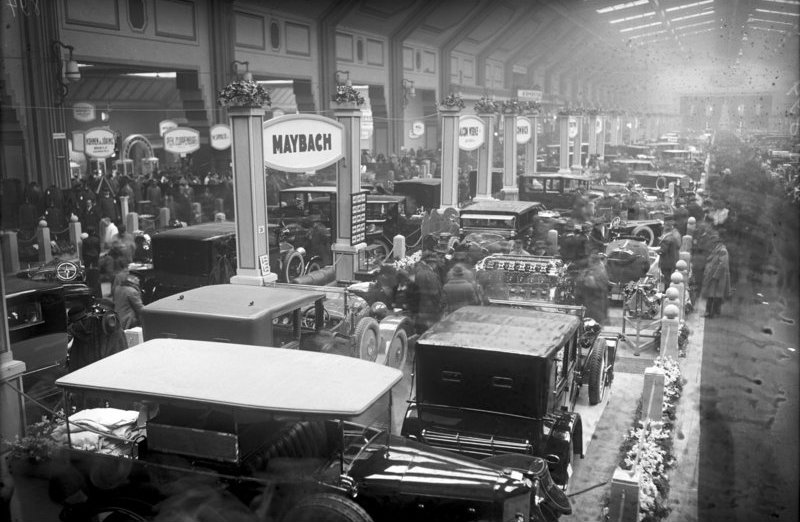
Maybach stand, 1924

With a pause after the war, the IAA was then reinstated and returned to a newly built exhibition hall in Berlin Westend in 1921, with 67 German automobile manufacturers displaying 90 vehicles under the motto "comfort", including the Rumpler Tropfenwagen and a Bosch electric car horn. More than 600 exhibitors participated in the 15th IAA in 1923 and the next year's show saw the premiere of economy cars like the Hanomag 2/10 PS or the Opel 4 PS (Laubfrosch).

The 1927 IAA was held at Cologne, under pressure from Mayor Konrad Adenauer. The 20th IAA was in Leipzig in March 1928. The 21st exhibition was again held in Berlin in November. It featured the first German vehicle with a rack steering and independent suspension (Röhr 8) as well as the eight-cylinder Opel Regent luxury car and a crank operated window by Brose.

The 1929, 1930, and 1932 IAA were cancelled due to the Great Depression. Despite the still perceptible after-effects of the global recession, the 22nd IAA was held in Berlin in 1931 with a total of 295,000 visitors. For the first time the exhibition included front-wheel drive vehicles like the DKW F1.

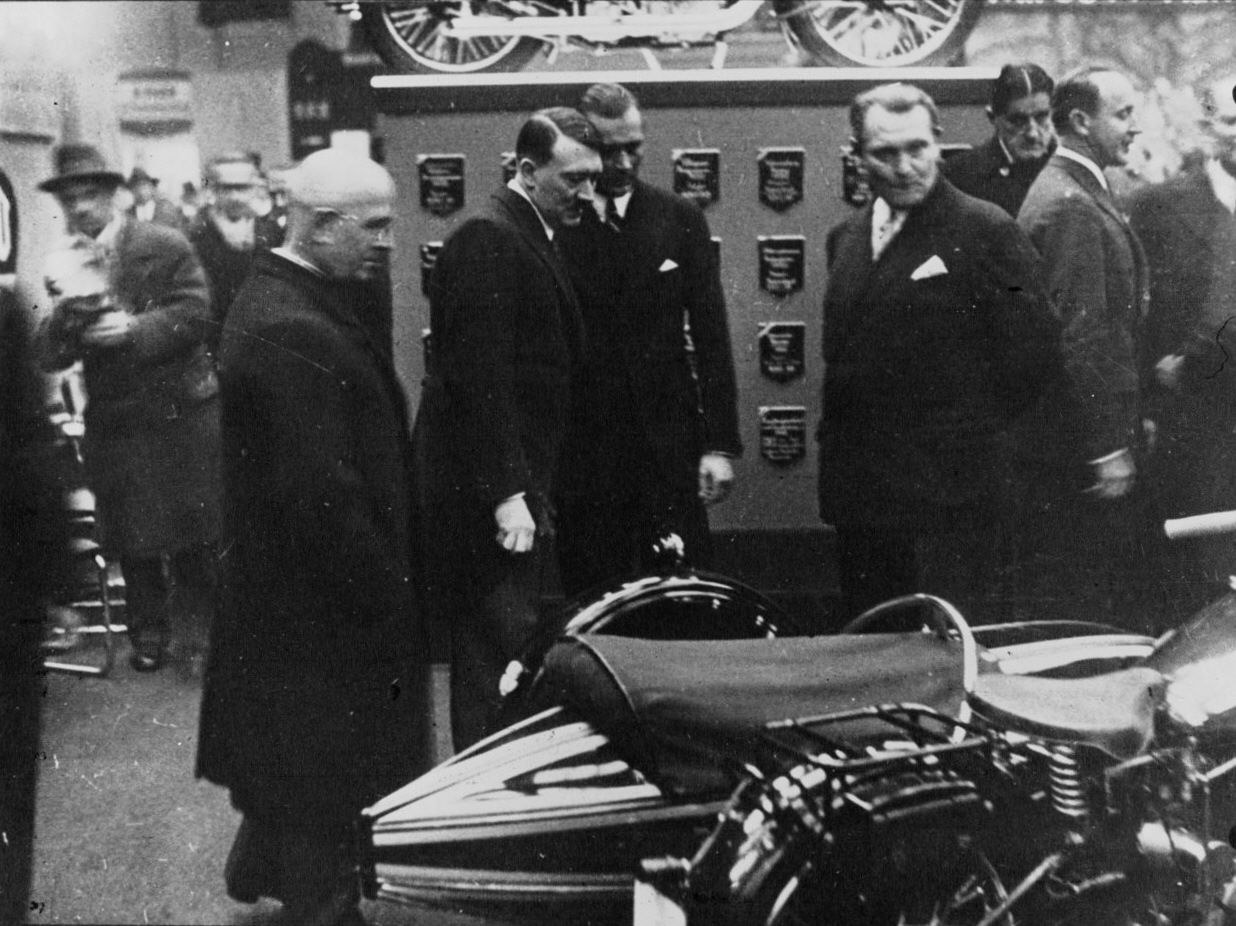
Hitler and Göring at the Berlin Motor Show, February 1933

The 23rd IAA was held from 11 to 23 February 1933, a few days after the Nazi seizure of power. It was inaugurated by Chancellor Adolf Hitler, who announced tax benefits for car owners, a major road construction programme and state-funded motorsport events. New models introduced included the Ford Köln, the Standard Superior, as well as the twelve-cylinder Maybach Zeppelin DS 8, then the most expensive German car ever built. In the following years, the annual exhibition developed to a national hall of fame of German engineering skill, essentially influenced by Nazi propaganda.

Pushed by extensive billboard and screen advertising, the IAA became a mass event, with more than 600,000 visitors in 1934. In his inaugural speech, Hitler promised the construction of a cheap, simple car for the masses. He also proclaimed the idea of economic autarky, illustrated by the display of wood gas generators based on the patent of Georges Imbert or a steam car designed by Henschel. Nevertheless, the launch of the stream-lined Tatra 77 attracted greater attention.

The manufacturing of the people's car (Volkswagen) remained the central issue of the following exhibitions. In 1939, the KdF-car was presented for the first time, which later came to be known as the Beetle. The 29th installation of the event gathered a total of 825,000 visitors - an all-time record at that time. This was the last IAA before it was again suspended during World War II.

== 2000 ==
The 2000 show was the last Berlin Motor Show, with over 200,000 visitors.

- Audi A4 Sedan
- Opel Zafira 1.6 CNG

== 1998 ==
In 1998, the AAA was held at the Berlin exposition area between October 17 and 25.

== 1996 ==
- Audi A4 Avant Duo
- Ford Ka "Step 1" Concept
