= Lotus 23 =

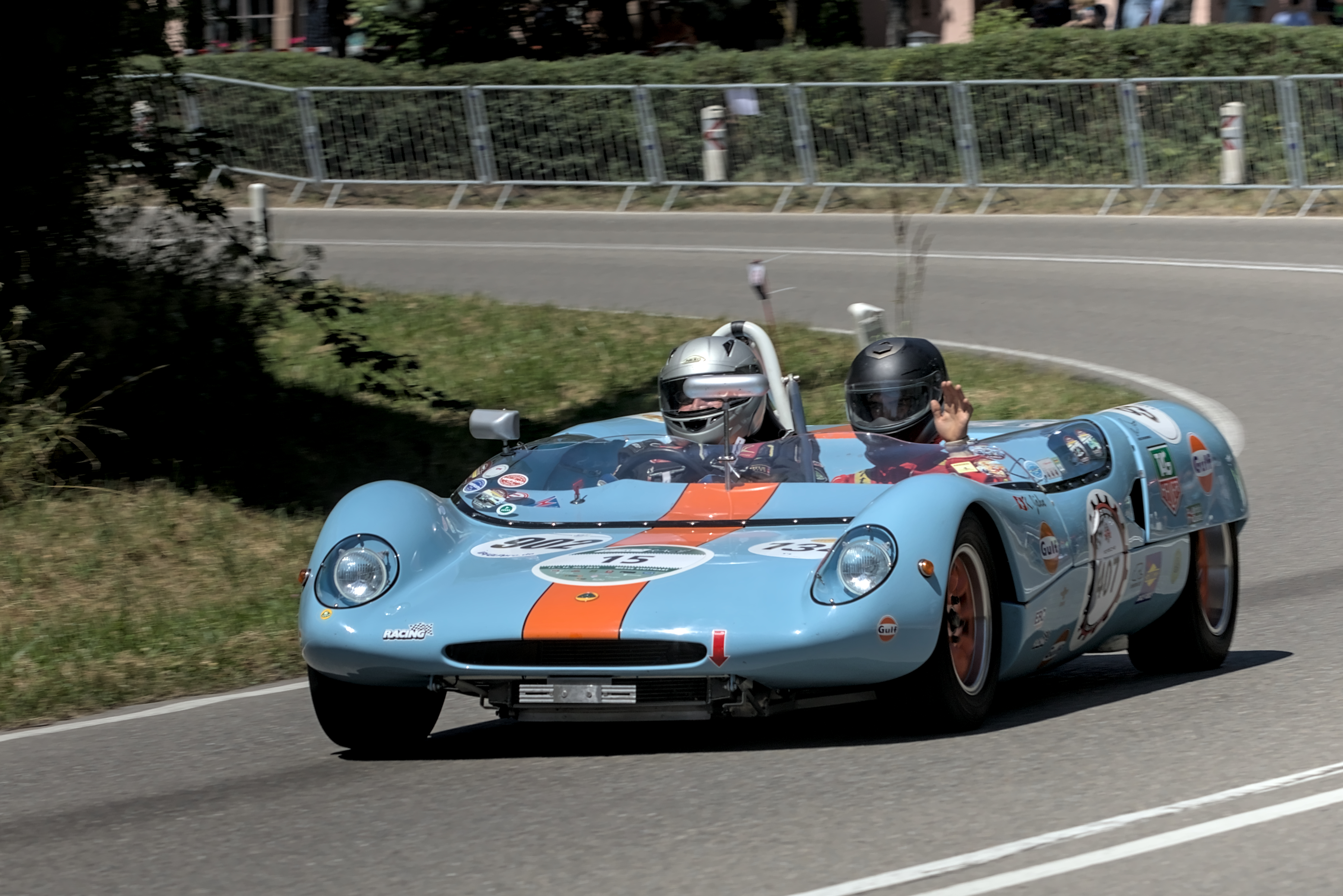

Overview
- Manufacturer: Lotus Components Ltd.
- Production: 1962–1963
- Designer: Colin Chapman

Body and chassis
- Class: Group 4 Sports Car
- Body style: Open two seater

Powertrain
- Engine: 742cc Coventry Climax FWMC 748cc Coventry Climax FWMB; 997cc Cosworth Mk.III; 1098cc Cosworth Mk.IV; 1340cc Cosworth Mk.VI; 1475cc Cosworth Mk.VII; 1498cc Cosworth Mk.X 1594cc Cosworth Mk.XII, Mk.XIII
- Transmission: 23: Hewland Mk.III 5sp (Renault 4 sp on some prototypes) 23B & 23C: Hewland Mk.IV 23B & 23C with Cosworth Mk.XII or XIII: Hewland Mk.V

Dimensions
- Wheelbase: 90 in (2,286 mm)
- Length: 139 in (3,531 mm)
- Width: 23 & 23B: 60 in (1,524 mm); 23C: 65 in (1,651 mm)
- Height: 23 & 23B: 26 in (660 mm); 23C: 27 in (686 mm)
- Curb weight: 1,000 lb (454 kg) (dry)

Chronology
- Predecessor: Lotus 17
- Successor: Lotus 53 (not built)

The Lotus 23 was designed by Colin Chapman as a small-displacement sports racing car. Nominally a two-seater, it was purpose-built for FIA Group 4 racing in 1962–1963. Unlike its predecessors Lotus 15 and 17, the engine was mounted amidship behind the driver in the similar configuration developed on Lotus 19.

== The 23 ==
To comply with FIA rules, it had a regulation trunk space to the right-rear of the driver, a windshield wiper, a horn, pairs of headlights and tail lights, rear center licence plate light, a cable-operated hand brake, and a mounting space for one spare tire under the front body. The 23 used a wider version of the Lotus 22 space frame, clothed in a fiberglass body.

It was originally intended for engines of 750 cc to 1300 cc (45-80ci) with a Renault 4-speed transaxle, but mostly had a 5-speed Hewland Mk.III in production, which used the entire Volkswagen magnesium alloy transaxle case in upside-down configuration, housing bespoke straight-cut gears with dog-rings, and the Volkswagen differential gear set. Unlike the later Mk.IV/V, the Mk.III had the shifter rod at the end of the VW nose casing, so the shifting rod (pipe) from the centre shifter knob location extended to the tail end of the chassis. As this part was not completely covered by the bodywork, a following driver with good eyesight could tell when the 23 with a Renault 4-speed or Hewland Mk.III shifted gears.

The front suspension was a typical double wishbone arms with outboard coil/damper unit using the Triumph upright made by Alford & Alder, Triumph Herald rack and pinion steering, and outboard Girling non-ventilated disc brake. The rear had the top link with lower reversed wishbones, top and bottom radius arms with the top arm at the height of the halfshaft, combined with the outboard disc brakes and coil/damper units. Unlike the fixed-halfshaft arrangement for Lotus 20 suspension, the halfshafts had Metalastic rubber 'doughnuts' on the inside, carrying no cornering force (side load). The side forces are carried by the lower wishbone, together with the top 'I' arm link, which connects the tail end of the upper side tube in the frame with the extended top end of the cast-alloy upright.

The tie-rod end, front top and bottom wishbone outside joints were ball joints, and the rear lower wishbone inside joints were Rose Joints. The rest of the suspension joints were rubber joints, with joint-mounting short pipes welded onto the ends of suspension arms. While many of the suspension arms were in common with Lotus 22, the angle of the rear radius arms on the plan view was different from the narrower-frame Lotus 22, so they were not interchangeable with the 22.

On the frame structure, the lower side pipes and the width-wise lower pipe behind the cockpit were rectangle tubes, with most of the other frame pipes being round steel tubes in various diameter. The upper left round pipe was used as the water feed pipe (the use of anti-freeze chemicals was prohibited by most of the race organisers at the time for the danger of making the tarmac slippery) for the radiator up front, and the lower right side pipe and a half of the width-wise lower rear cockpit pipe were used as the return path. Likewise, the upper right side pipe was the oil feed to the oil cooler, and the lower left tube was the return. This frame was mostly made by Arch Motors, carrying 'AM' serial number.

This water/oil-bearing frame configuration was shared with Lotus 22 and later Lotus formula cars, but the combination of a wider and thus larger radiator, wider and bulkier steel frame acting as a cooling device, and the small displacement engines, resulted in more than ample cooling capacity. Atypical of the contemporary racing cars, Lotus 23 models sometimes experienced an over-cooling problem when the thermostat was not installed in the coolant circuit in sprint races, and displayed a very stable water/oil temperature in endurance racing.

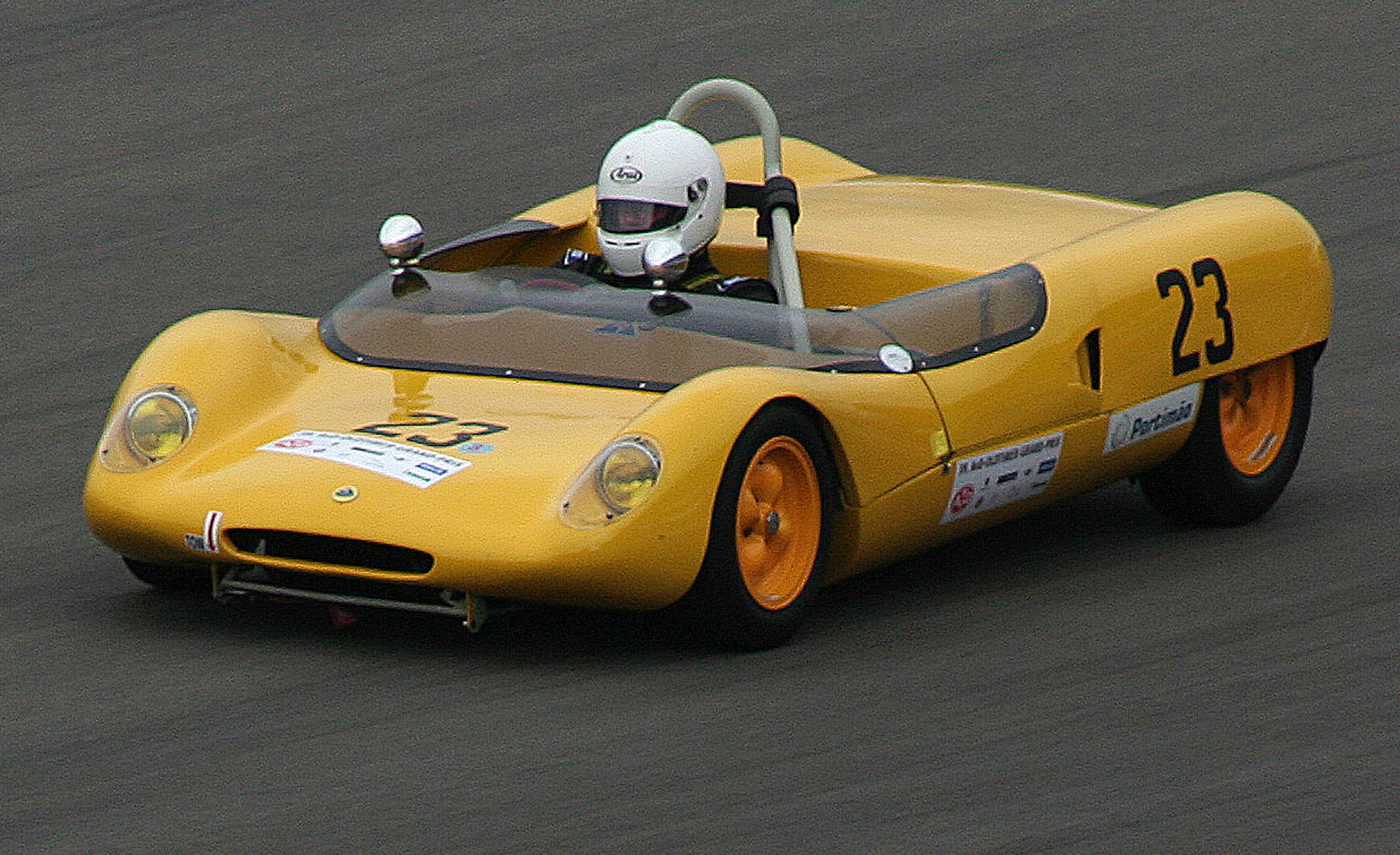
Lotus 23B. The much thicker 3-point roll bar, as opposed to the original thin 2-point, and smoked wind screen are modern additions

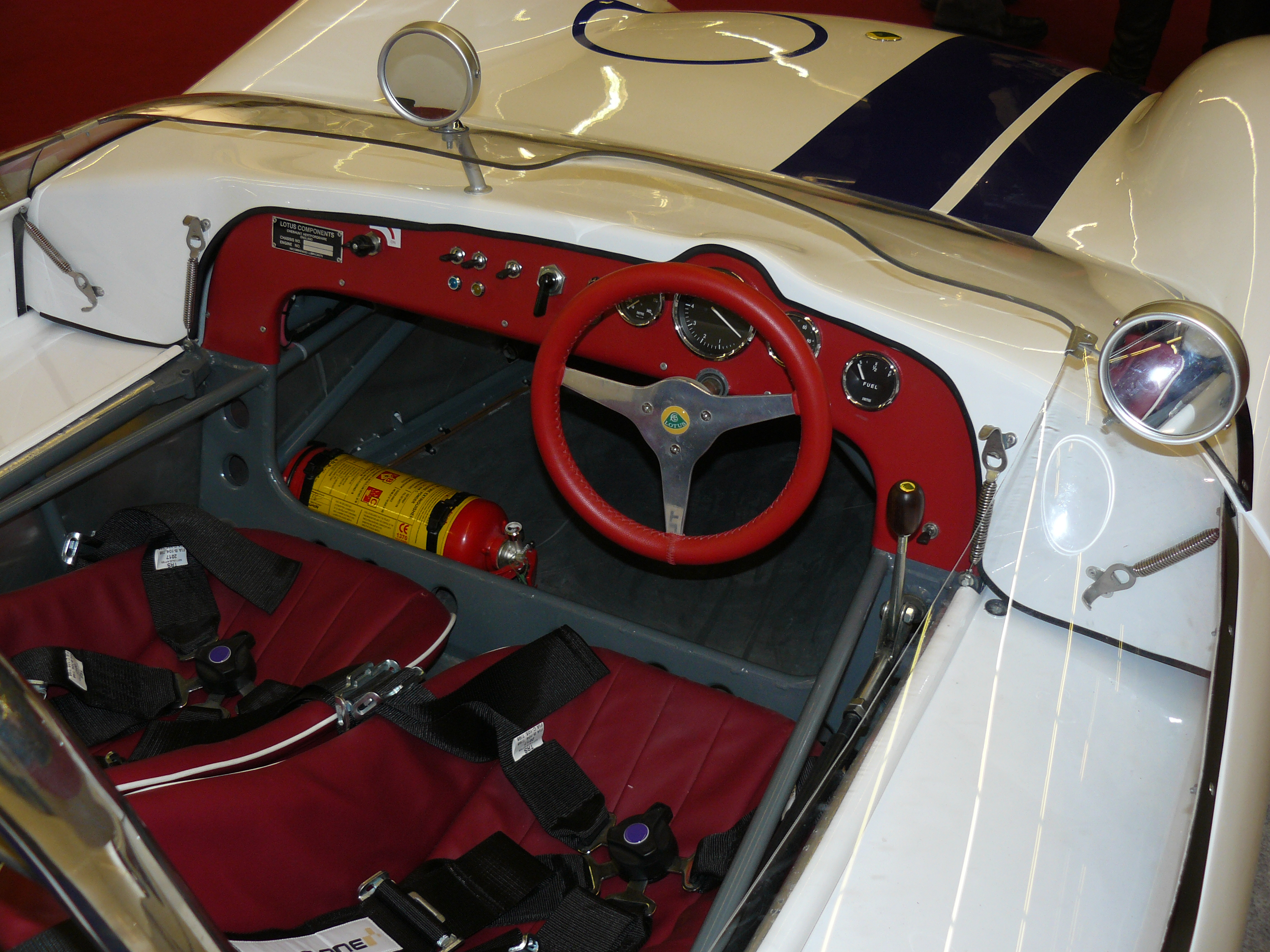
23B cockpit. The two structural pipes (one just inside of the gear shifter) running length-wise connecting the front bulkhead to the rear section, are unique to 23B and 23C. These are the factory-standard rear view mirror locations

== The 23B ==
The 23B in 1963 had the original center gear shifter relocated to the right side of the driver, and the radiator and oil cooler were combined into a single unit, with the lower 1/5 or so acting as the oil cooler. The frame received additional structural tubes to take the torque of Lotus TwinCam-based 1.6 litre Cosworth Mk.XII and Mk.XIII, mated to "high torque spec" 5-speed Hewland Mk.V transaxle. Smaller displacement engines were mated to 5-speed Hewland Mk.IV. Both the Mk.IV and Mk.V transaxles had GKN (Ford Zephyr) differential gears and a forward-facing selector rod on the right side in a bespoke (Hewland made) tail casing.

The intake funnels on the Weber carburetors on 23B (and the 23C) were housed in a "cold air box" which received fresh air from two oval holes cut out on the top side of the rear body behind the driver.

== The 23C ==
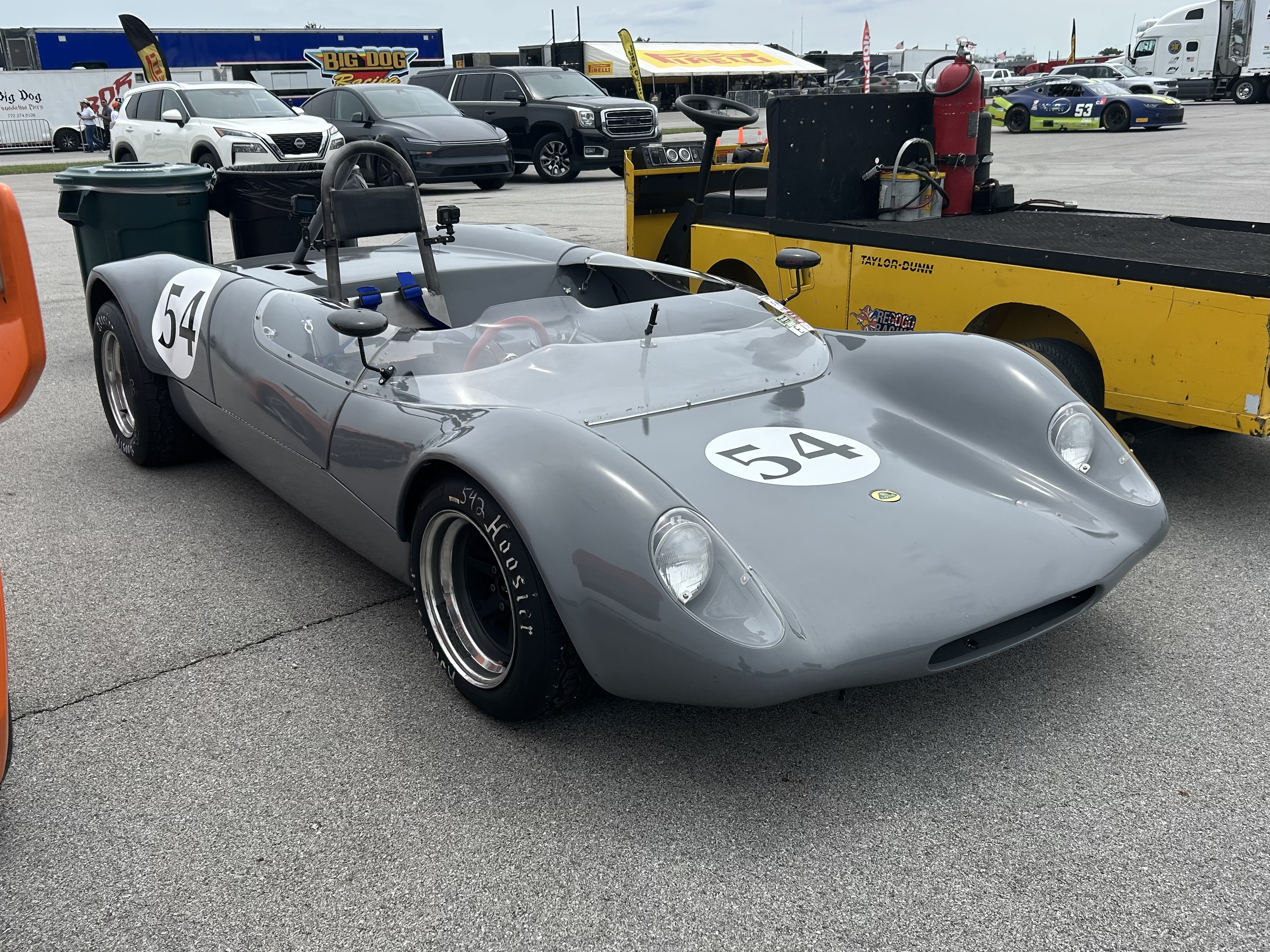
The Lotus 23C at an SVRA event at Indianapolis Motor Speedway in 2026.

The 23B proved to be very successful in being a "giant killer" often beating cars in larger classes, but the limited road adhesion due to the narrow tyre width became apparent as the shortcoming in running with the larger cars. The 23C was developed using much wider Formula Two tyres mounted on wider 6-stud, six-spoke magnesium wheels front and rear. The body received wing-extensions to cover the wider tyres, with the characteristic 23/23B rear wings (covering the top half of the wheels on the outside) cut-out to expose the entire tyre/wheel in the side view.

Lotus 23 proved a competitive, durable, and popular race car. These cars are still a mainstay of vintage racing in Europe and the United States today.
Including the 23B and 23C, about 130 examples were made in period, but the popularity of the model led to many additional cars assembled from replacement and reproduction parts. The current estimate on the total number ranges between 200 and 400 excluding Xanthos and Noble.

== Debut at the Nürburgring ==
The debut of the 23 was at the Nordschleife on 27 May in the 1962 1000km of Nürburgring. The tiny 100 bhp (70 kW) Lotus 23 with the newly developed Cosworth Mk.X 1.5 litre based on the Lotus TwinCam engine shot away from the field of Aston Martin DBR1, Ferrari 330LM/GTO, Ferrari Dino 246SP, Porsche 718WRS and others with Jim Clark at the wheel in the rain. Even though some cars had almost four times the power of the Lotus, Clark was 27 seconds ahead of Dan Gurney's Porsche 718GTR after the first lap in the wet. Extending his lead on each lap until the track dried, Clark was overcome by exhaust fumes from a damaged exhaust manifold on lap 12 and crashed out in the 44 lap race.

Another 23 with a 997cc pushrod Cosworth Mk.III driven by Peter Ashdown and Bruce Johnstone also attended this race, entered by Ian Walker Racing, and won the 1L Sportscar class with the 8th overall result, beating the winners of 3L Prototype class (Maserati Tipo 61 CDM) and 1L Prototype class (Midship DOHC engine René Bonnet Djet III) by 3 laps. It also beat a 3L Sportscar class Ferrari 250 Testa Rossa, 2L Prototype class Alfa Romeo Giulietta SZ and a 4L Prototype class Jaguar E-Type.

== Banned from Le Mans ==
With the sensational Nürburgring debut well publicised in the press, two 23s were entered at Le Mans in June 1962. One with a 742 cc (45.3 cu in) aluminium-block DOHC Coventry Climax FWMC with drivers Les Leston / Tony Shelly, and another with one litre Iron block pushrod Cosworth Mk.III with drivers Jim Clark / Trevor Taylor.

The 23s failed to pass the scrutineering on several technical grounds, including an insufficient windscreen height, fuel tank capacity being too large, turning circle too large, ground clearance too small, and the spare tyre requirement not met. Fitted with a makeshift tall wind screen, all but the spare tyre issue was rectified almost immediately.

The original 23 and the later 23B had 4 stud front and 6 stud rear wobbly-web wheels, and carried the narrower and lighter front wheel with its tyre mounted as the spare. (23C had wider 6 stud front and rear wheels.)

The French scrutineers argued the requirement to carry a spare tyre is for the purpose of changing a flat, which is not satisfied by the 23 in the case of a flat occurring on one of the rear tyres. So the Lotus factory had a 4 stud rear hubs drafted and machined over-night, and had a person carry them and flown to Le Mans the next day. After being presented with the 23s with 4 stud rears installed, the scrutineers rejected again on the grounds that the 6 stud configuration must have been a reflection of strength requirement in the original design, so the 4 stud configuration was deemed unsafe.

The scrutineers and the ACO did not change this position even after Mike Costin, the Lotus engineer on site, offered to go over structural analysis calculations showing the difference falls within the safety margin built in the design to accommodate more powerful 1,098 cc (67.0 cu in) Cosworth Mk.IV and 1,475 cc (90.0 cu in) Cosworth Mk.VII engines.

One of the two Lotus 23s with 4 stud rears, with Cosworth Mk.III 997 cc (60.8 cu in) engine, was sold off sans engine on the spot to the 1 litre class winning driver of the event, with a lease on the engine and support contract attached, on a strict condition imposed by Chapman to keep the 4 stud configuration for longer than one racing season. The French driver/buyer, Bernard Consten, not only obliged but won Clermont-Ferrand 6 Hours and 1000 km of Montlhery that year with this 23 without breaking the studs, the hub, or the wheel.

Team Lotus remained on the scene for the entire 1962 event supporting and winning the 1.3 litre GT class and the Index of Performance prize by a Lotus Elite driven by David Hobbs and Frank Gardner. ACO officials then made the situation worse in admitting a mistake, offering a financial compensation for the 23 entries after the race. With pro-Lotus motoring journalist Gérard Crombac (who reported the entire fiasco in a French publication, suggesting the Ferrari 246SP and 268SP had the same ground clearance issue, but were allowed to race unrectified after the Ferrari team threatened to withdraw the entire team) present as the interpreter in the meeting, Chapman suggested a figure which was too large for the officials to swallow. Upon being rejected, Chapman vowed "We will never race again at Le Mans!", a promise that Lotus kept until 1997, long after Chapman's death in 1982.

Chapman believed the fiasco was caused by the French contender for Index of Thermal Efficiency award, René Bonnet. Gérard Crombac knew of a competitor to Bonnet, Jean Rédélé, who had a strong ambition to beat the then-dominant Automobiles René Bonnet in thermal efficiency at Le Mans, and gave the idea of helping Alpine instead of subsequent direct participation to Chapman. As a result, a 2-seater racing prototype was designed by a team of Lotus employees, Len Terry, Bob Dance and Keith Duckworth, based on Lotus 23.

This design was found to be non-compliant to the 1963 Le Mans regulations, so the frame structure was changed to a steel backbone design familiar to Rédélé's team at Alpine, and became the Alpine M63. M64 of 1964 had the original frame designed by Terry, and the French Alpine M63 and M64 could fit British 6-stud Wobbly Web wheels as a testament.

In 1964 Le Mans, Alpine won the Index of Thermal Efficiency with the M64 while setting a new distance record for the 1150cc Prototype class, with a M63B in the second place. Alpine went on to become the Le Mans overall winner in 1978.

== Restoration and replication of the Lotus 23 ==
Beginning in the early 1980s a small group of enthusiasts began to make it possible to restore original Lotus 23 by remanufacturing parts. These parts are now easily available. It was at about this time that a Register was established for the Lotus 23. That Register is now part of the Historic Lotus Register of the UK. Some race organizers and the Historic Motor Sports Association began in 2007 to take steps to restrict race participation by replica cars.

There are several sources of replicas of Lotus 23 cars.

=== Xanthos 23 ===
The Xanthos 23 (1999) is an exact reproduction of the 23B using the same frame design as the 1960s original. Powered by Lotus-Ford Twin Cam or its Cosworth derivatives mostly mated to Hewland Mk.8 or Mk.9, it was built by Xanthos Sports Cars in Liverpool, a UK company owned by Lotus specialist Kelvin Jones. Xanthos cars is now based in Niagara falls Canada, and can still supply turn key cars and parts

=== Noble 23 ===
Following the success of his Ultima GTR project, Lee Noble created a Lotus 23 replica in 1996 with a wider track than the original to allow for the use of wider tyres. With a lower level of adherence to the original design than the Xanthos, it proved successful in racing, with over 60 cars produced using either Lotus TwinCam or Renault V6 engines. Noble's version continued in production, first by Auriga Design using an Alfa Romeo engine and transaxle, and then as the C23 Lotus 23 replica by Mamba Motorsport near Oxford, UK using Ford Duratec Engines.

=== LusoMotors LM23 ===
The Portuguese LusoMotors kit-car company with João Matoso dynamics engineering support built a reinterpretation of the Lotus 23 (called LM23) which was shown at NEC 2009.

=== Tiger Racing ERA30 ===
The UK Based Tiger Racing ERA 30 takes its design inspiration from the Lotus 23 although the car has been designed to be slightly larger with wider tyres and bigger brakes.

== Gallery ==
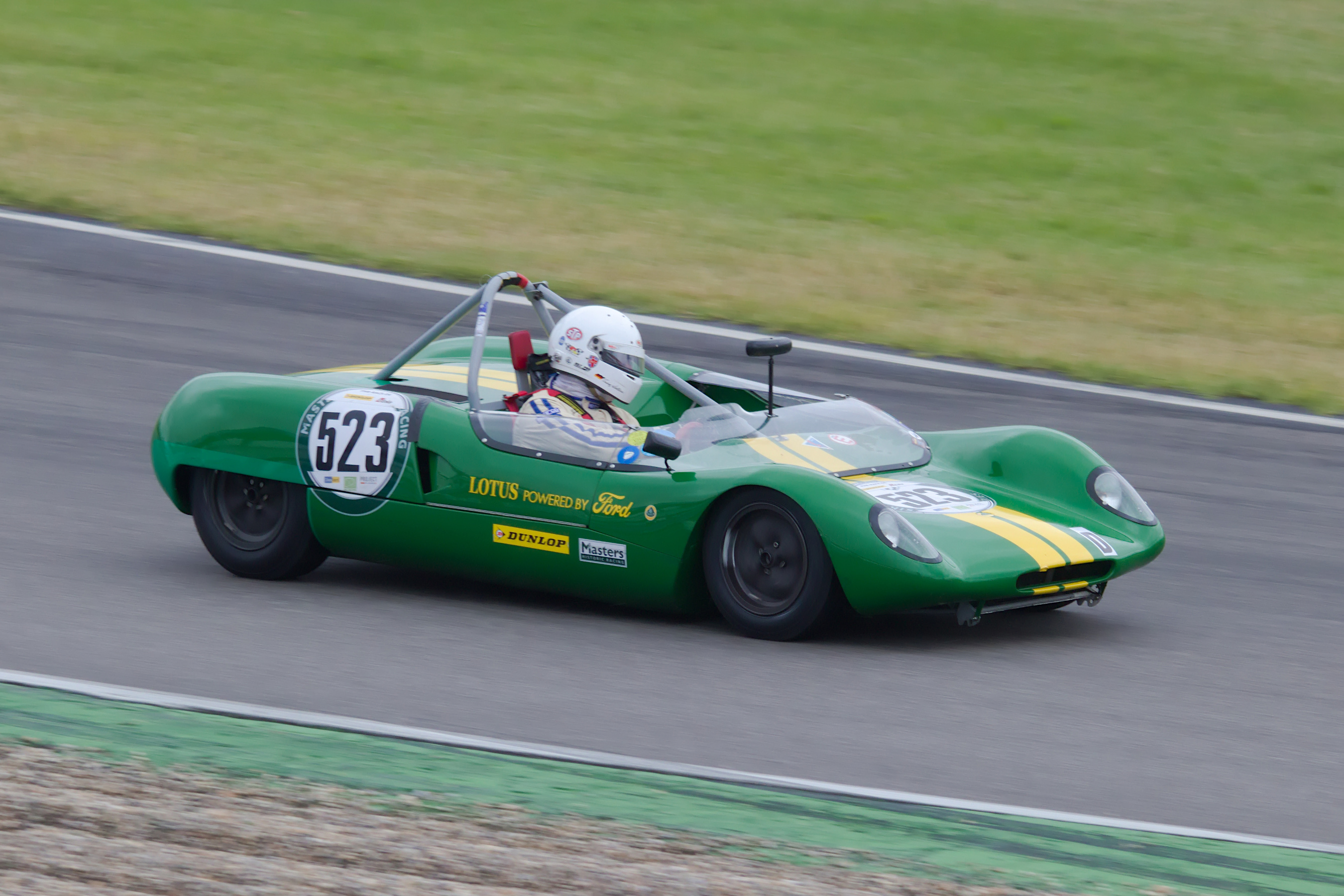

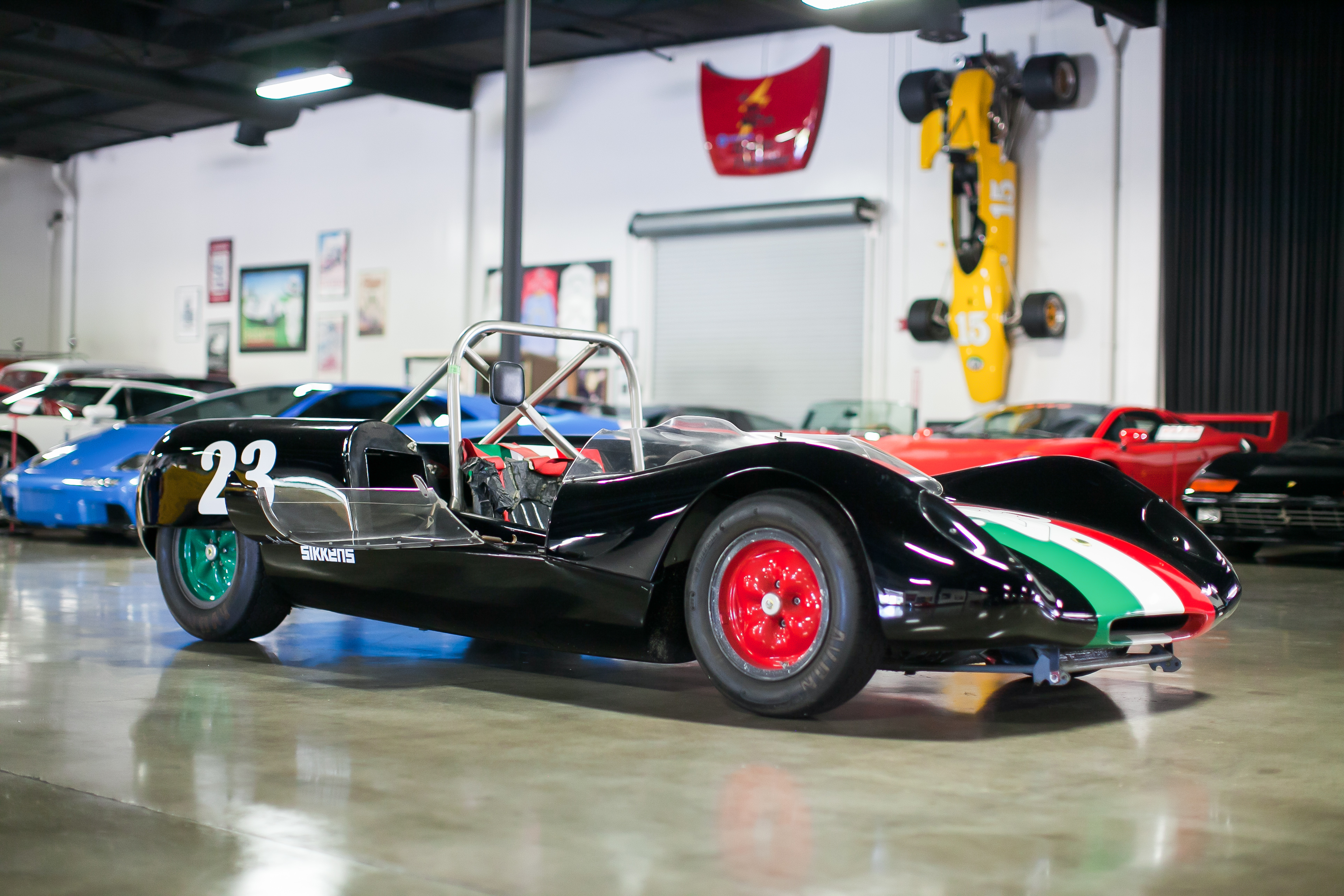

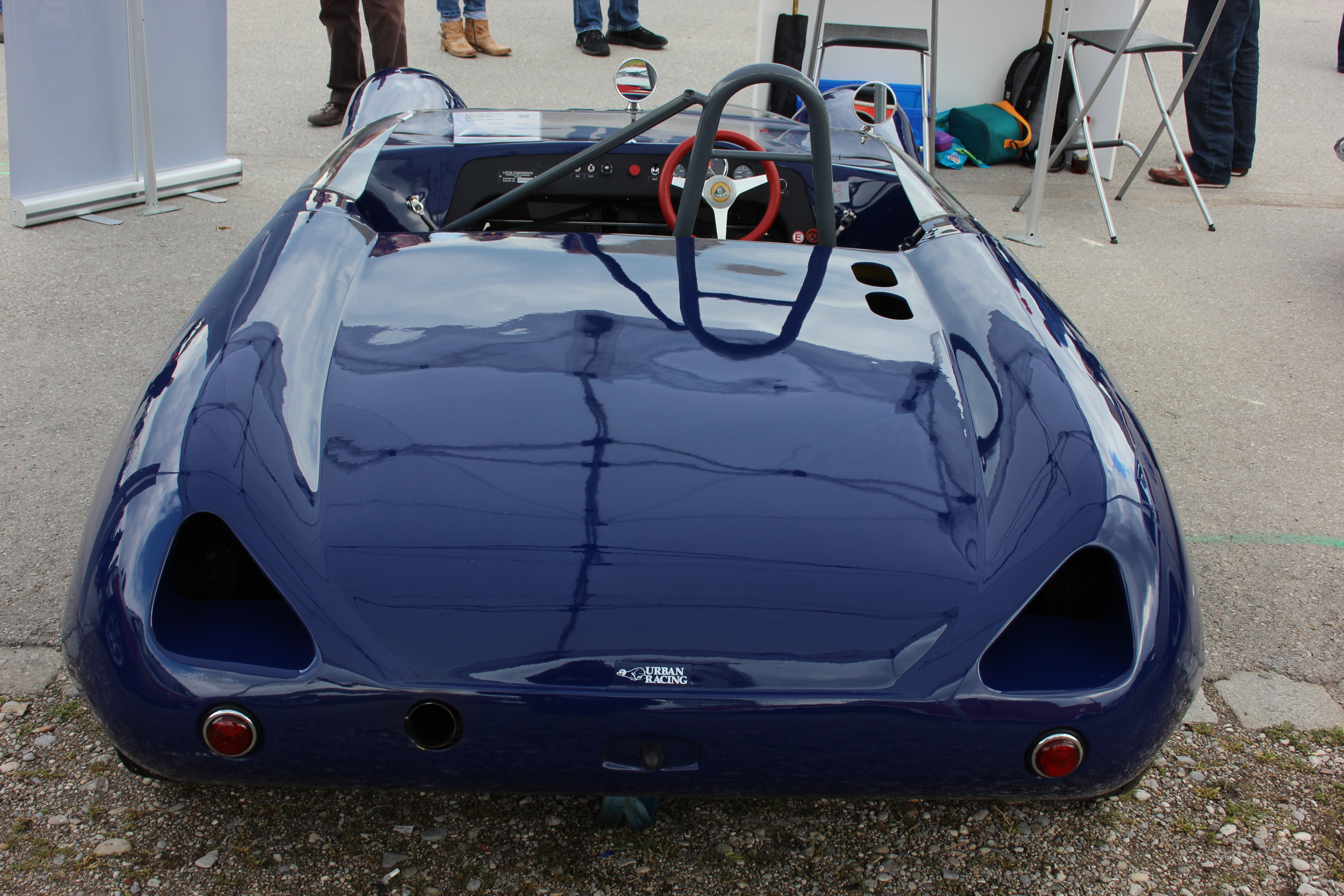

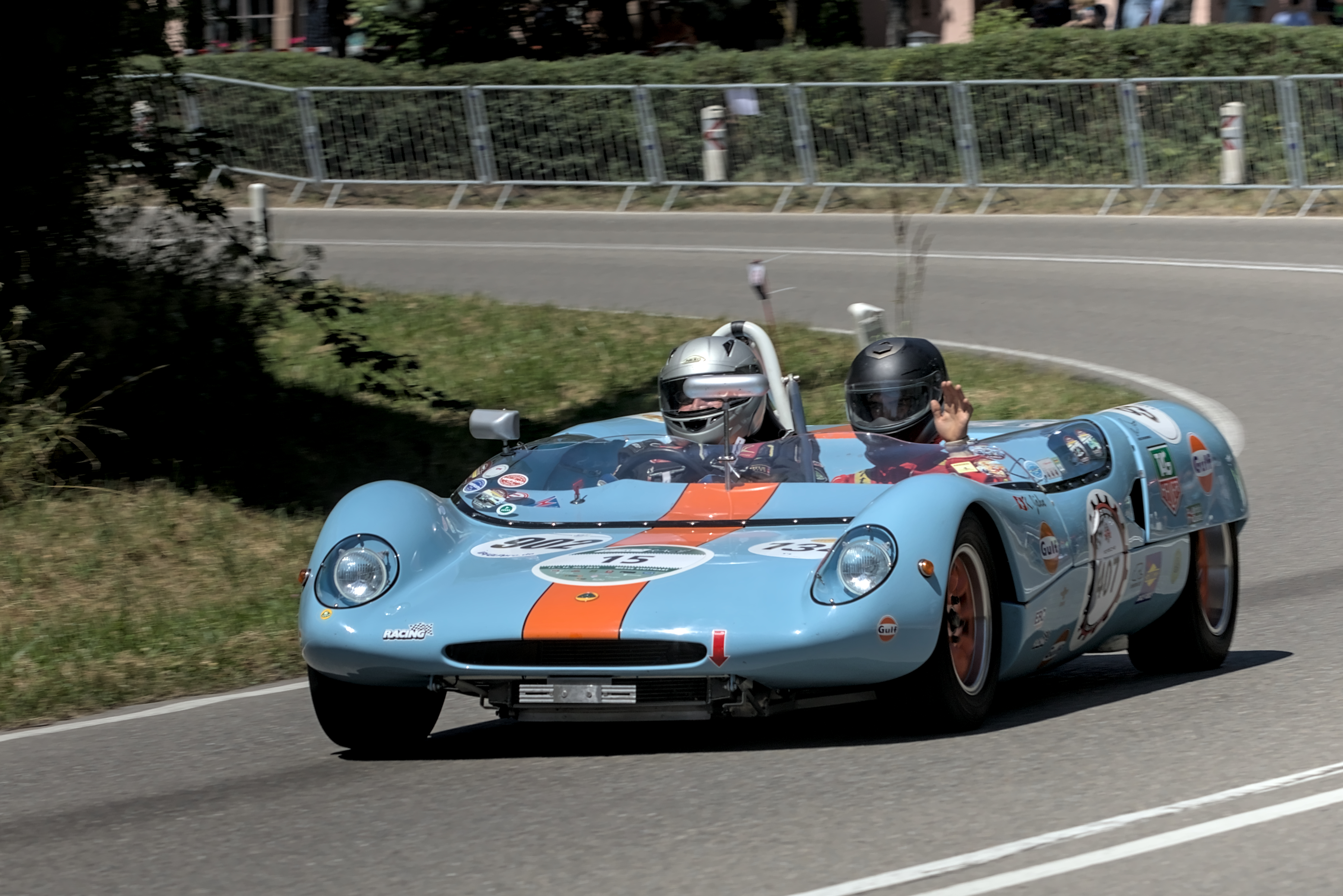
