= Wobbly-web wheel =

Form of metal disc wheel

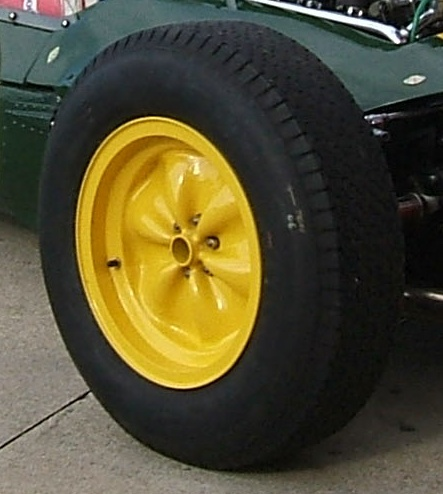
Wobbly-web rear wheel of a Lotus 33

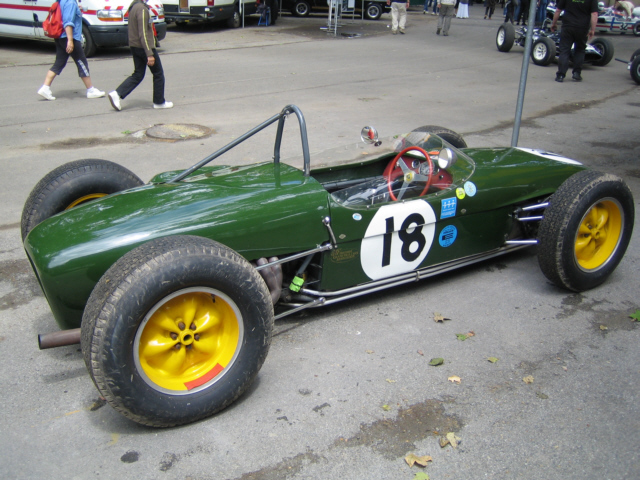
Lotus 18

The wobbly-web wheel is a form of metal disc wheel where the disc is 'wobbled' into spokes. This provides a stiffer, lightweight wheel.

Wobbly-web wheels are best known through their iconic use on Lotus racing cars of the late 1950s and 1960s.

== Theory ==
The theory of disc wheels depends on their behaviour as a stressed skin structure. Their materials are assumed to be inextensible, but flexible. Such a skin is stiff against tensile loads in the plane of the skin, but flexible for loads perpendicular to it. A flat disc is thus strong for radial loads in the plane of the disc and also for torques. It is flexible for axial loads, perpendicular to the disc plane and also for nutating, wobble of the axle at an angle to the main axis.

A coned disc also becomes stiff against axial loads, as the web is no longer purely perpendicular to the axis of the wheel. Unlike a flat disc, there is no direction where the whole of a coned disc would be perpendicular (and thus flexible) to it. A drawback of a simple cone is that the wheel now becomes wider, along the axis. The wobbly web effectively "folds" a coned disc wheel into pleats, making it narrower again, but retaining the axial stiffness. This pleated disc is also stiffer against nutating forces. In architecture, similarly, a 'serpentine wall', is strengthened against sideways forces by corrugation, allowing a thinner, lighter, cheaper structure.

A wobbly web wheel is a disc wheel with additional shaping, rather than a spoked wheel with merged spokes. To avoid stress concentrations, the webs form smooth curves rather than sharply defined spokes. Such wheels can be pressed from sheet steel, or cast in light alloy. Casting foundries prefer a disc that has a consistent wall thickness, as this makes shrinkage simpler to control. The Lotus wheel's peculiar shape was arrived at deliberately, by keeping this consistent wall thickness for ease of manufacture, and folding it to achieve the required variation of stiffness across the radius.

== Invention and early usage ==
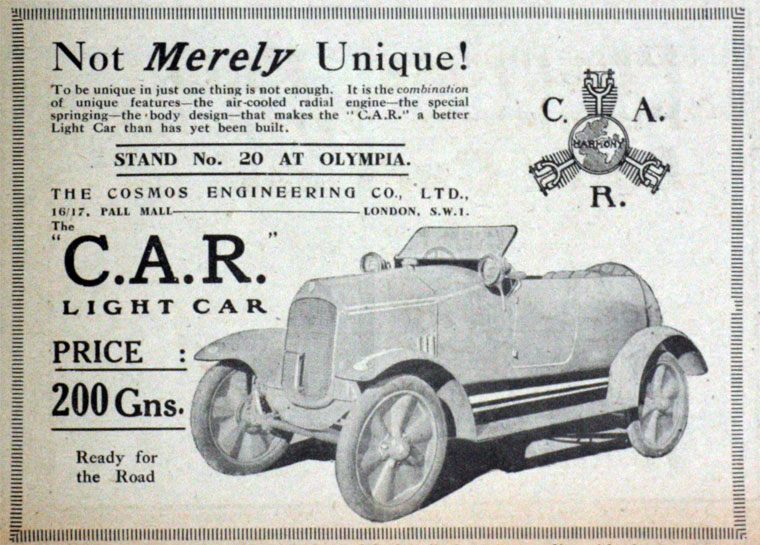
Cosmos car ad, 1919

The first wobbly web wheel was a design for a pulley centre, circa 1884. A straight strip of steel, with width the radius of the wheel, was folded into sharp corrugations. This accordion pleat was then fanned into a circle, the inner folds being closer than the outer. This disc was then cast into an iron hub and folded tabs on the outside of the sheet riveted to the pulley rim. These pulleys were produced by J & E Hall of Dartford. Plans were also made to develop this into a railway wheel, with the corrugations pressed into the shape of a half-torus.

The first use for a road wheel was by Roy Fedden for his innovative Cosmos car of 1919. This pressed steel wheel used a disc with six spokes on alternating sides and three retaining bolts.

== Railway locomotives ==
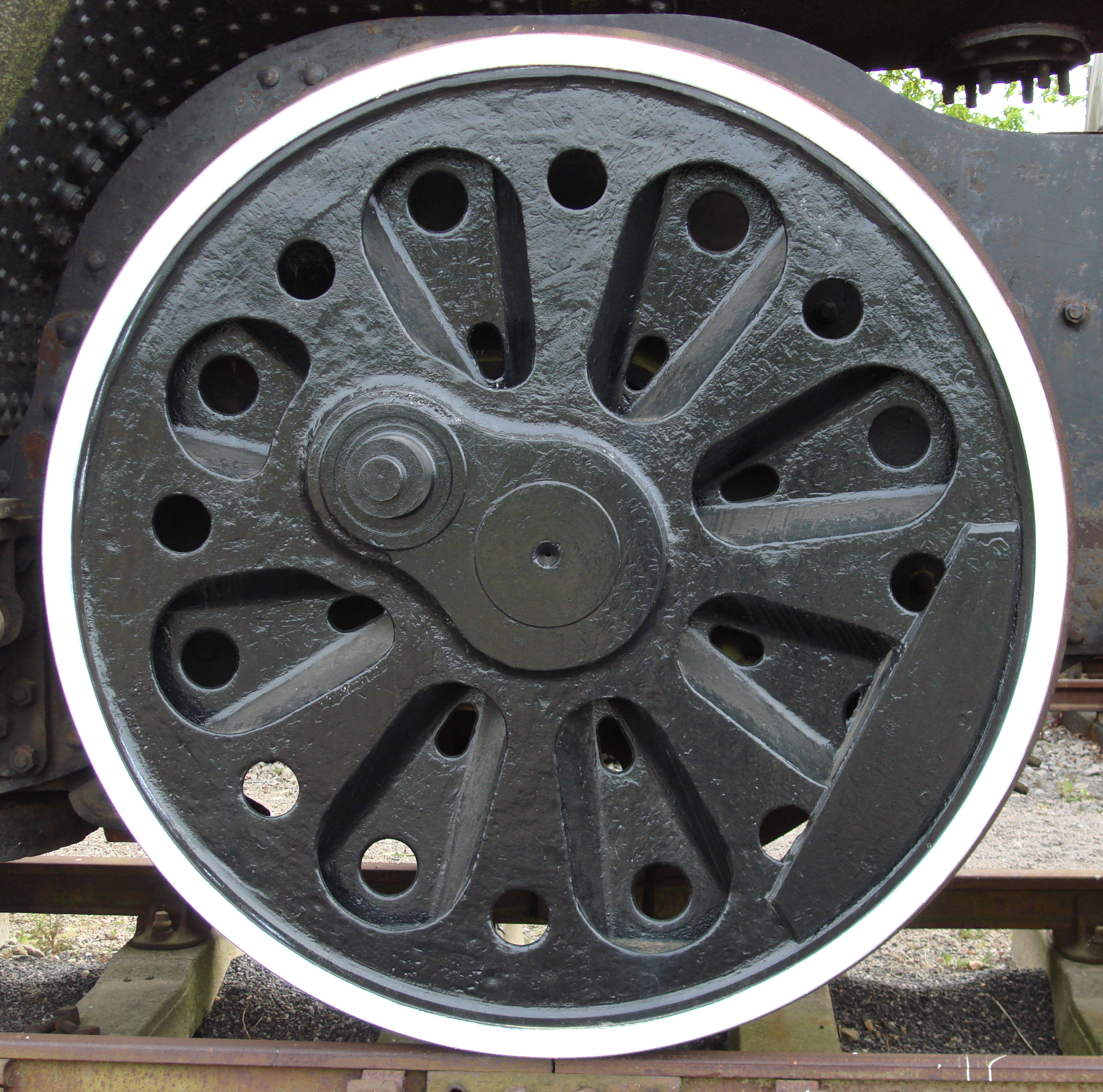
Bulleid Firth Brown (BFB) railway locomotive wheel

Steam locomotives use spoked driving wheels of cast steel. A few makers have favoured variants of this, seeking a more weight-efficient design by using various forms of hollow or girder spoke, rather than solid oval-section spokes. One of the most successful of these designs was the Bulleid Firth Brown (or BFB) wheel, often incorrectly confused with the Boxpok wheel. This had some features of the wobbly web, being developed from a flat disc wheel with short, wide "spokes" formed in it by displacing teardrop-shaped sections of the disc into another plane. Except for a few small lightening holes, this disc wheel is consistently one wall thickness thick, all around the disc.

Like the Lotus wheel, the BFB wheel also displays wide shallow pleats at its outside diameter, with narrower steeper pleats towards the centre (see image).

Although superficially visually similar to the BFB wheel, the true Boxpok design is, as indicated by its name, derived from "box spoke". This is a spoked wheel, with square box-section hollow spokes. The wheel disc in section is either two skin thicknesses at the spokes, or zero (i.e. open space) between them.

Lightweight corrugated wheels, of a standard 860mm diameter, appeared in the 1980s for local commuter trains in Japan.

== Aircraft ==
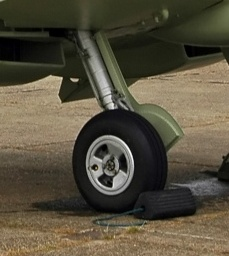
Undercarriage leg and wheel of a Supermarine Seafire

Aircraft with cast light alloy wheels appeared in the 1930s. A common form in British military practice used a single-thickness disc, displaced sideways in sharp-edged segments and joined by radial webs. Such wheels were fitted to, amongst others, the Spitfire. This basic design served with little change into the 1960s and the jet age.

The first distinctly wobbled web appeared on the Convair CV-240 of 1948. This used a wheel cast with nine narrow radial spokes formed from a curved disc.

== Lotus racing cars ==
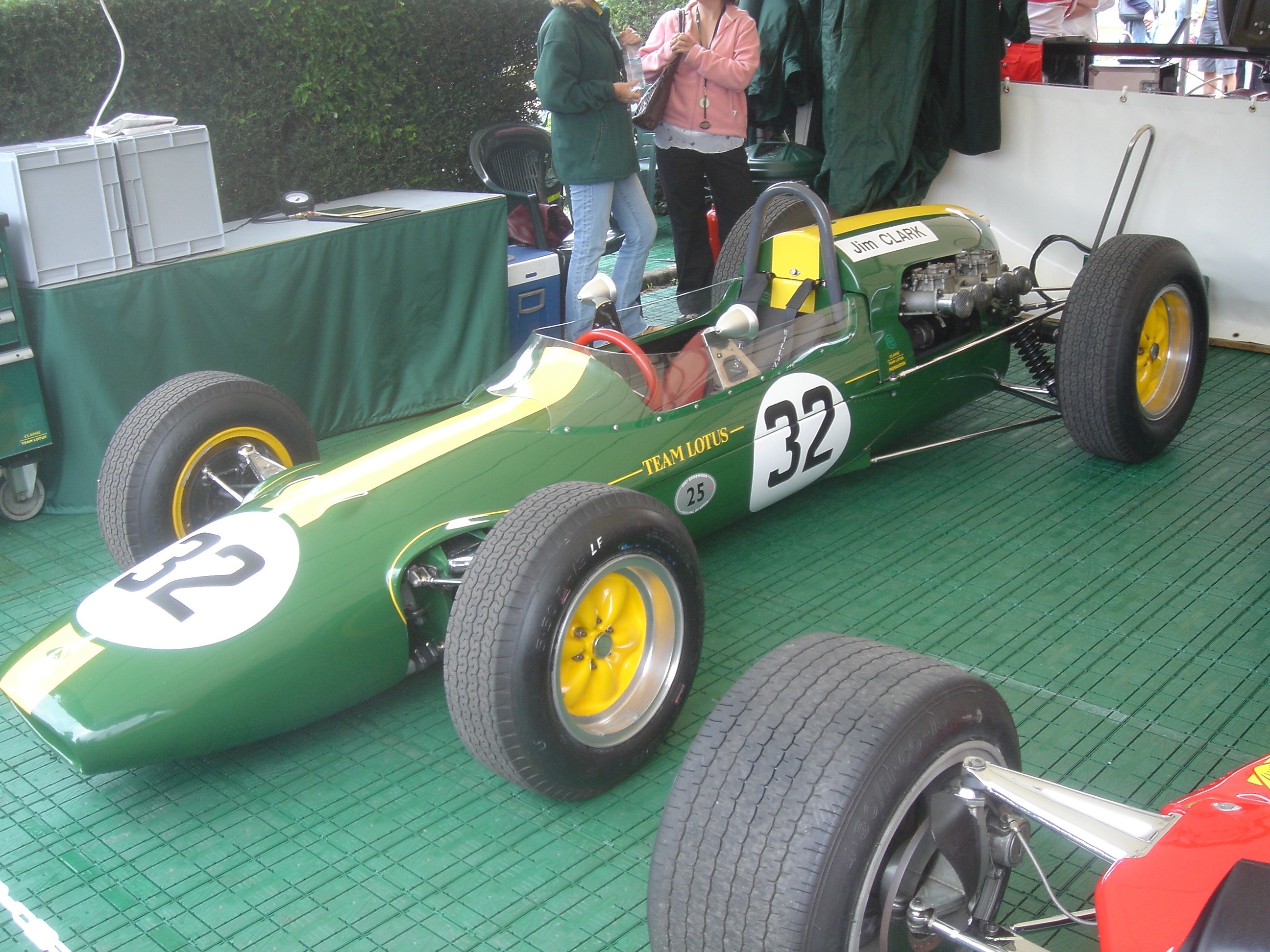
Lotus Climax 25

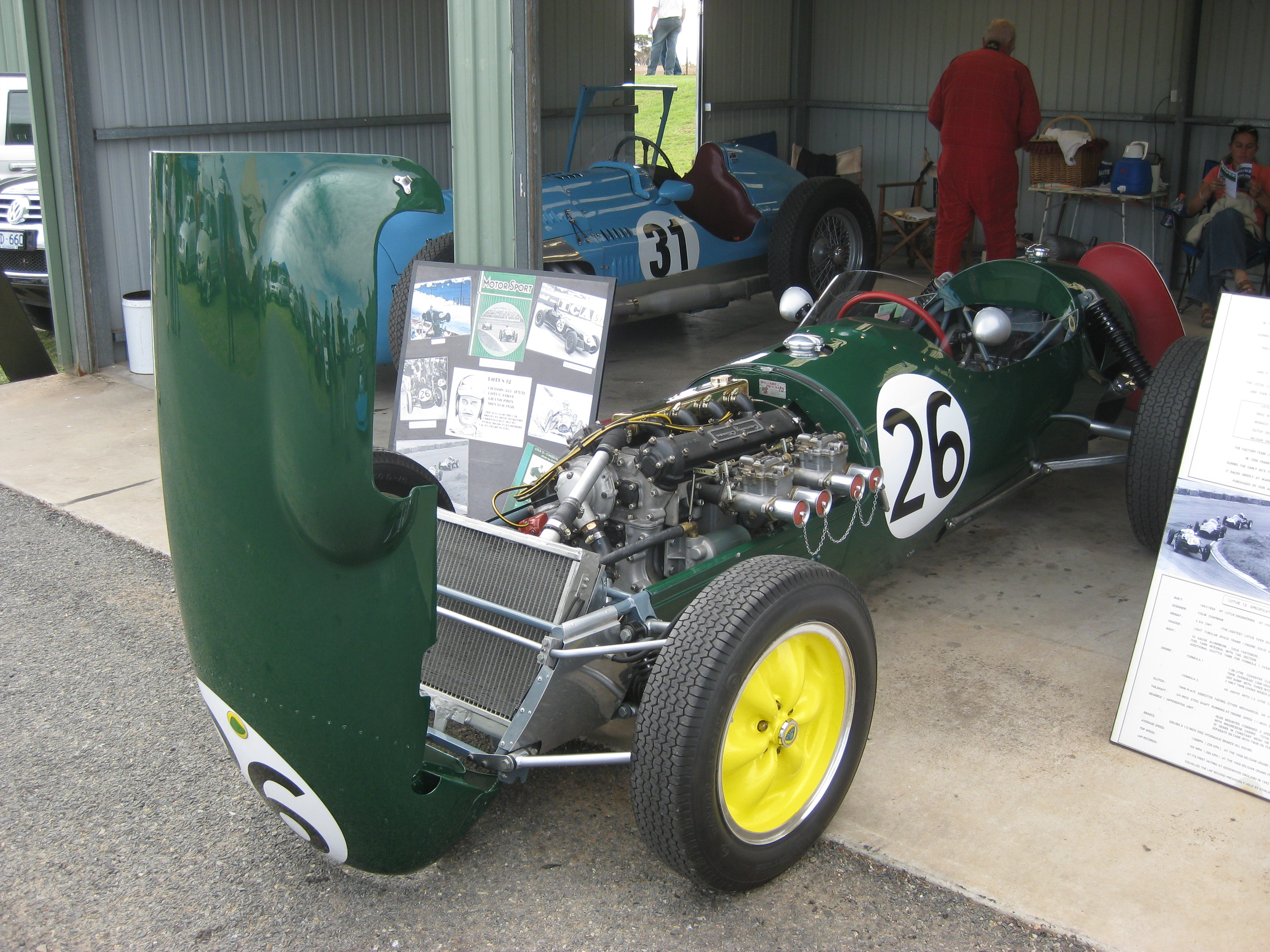
Lotus Twelve

The best-known example of the wobbly-web wheel was that used by Lotus for their racing cars of the late 1950s and early 1960s. These wheels first appeared on the Formula 2 Lotus Twelve of 1957. A similar wheel was used by Vanwall from 1958.

The wheel's design was, in typical Lotus fashion, intended to achieve the lightest possible weight. This is particularly important for wheels, as they are unsprung weight and the cars intended to carry them were extremely lightweight. Their designer was Lotus's Gilbert 'Mac' McIntosh, although again, in a typically Lotus fashion, they were often credited to Colin Chapman.

Unlike earlier 'waved' wheels, the Lotus design and its distinctive 'wobbles' was a deliberate feature, even down to the way that the wobbles are deeply indented near the hub and soften outwards to the rim. For ease of manufacture by casting, the wheels were designed with a constant wall thickness. Their stiffness (force/area) was required to be highest around the hub, so here the wheels were deeply and steeply folded. Towards the rim, distribution of this same force over a greater circumference and metal cross-section thus required less folding and their profile became a gentle wave.

As for many other Lotus components, the wheels were cast from Elektron magnesium-aluminium alloy. They were cast by Stone Foundries of Charlton. Cooper were already using magnesium wheels and apart from their technical advantages, Charles Cooper had found it highly profitable to sell drivers the many spare wheels required for racing, rather than having an external supplier take the business, something that Chapman was keen to emulate. McIntosh and Chapman also obtained foundry scrap, failed wheels from Coopers, and studied these failures to understand the failure modes of a magnesium racing wheel.

Lotus team's racing colours at this time were green and yellow, often small patches of each with the bodywork substantially of bare polished aluminium sheet. With the advent of the wobbly web wheel, rather than the previous wire wheels, the wheels were painted yellow and the car bodies green. This glossy bright yellow colour could be applied easily over the greenish-yellow zinc chromate primer used on the wheels to prevent corrosion.

=== 4 stud wheel controversy at Le Mans ===
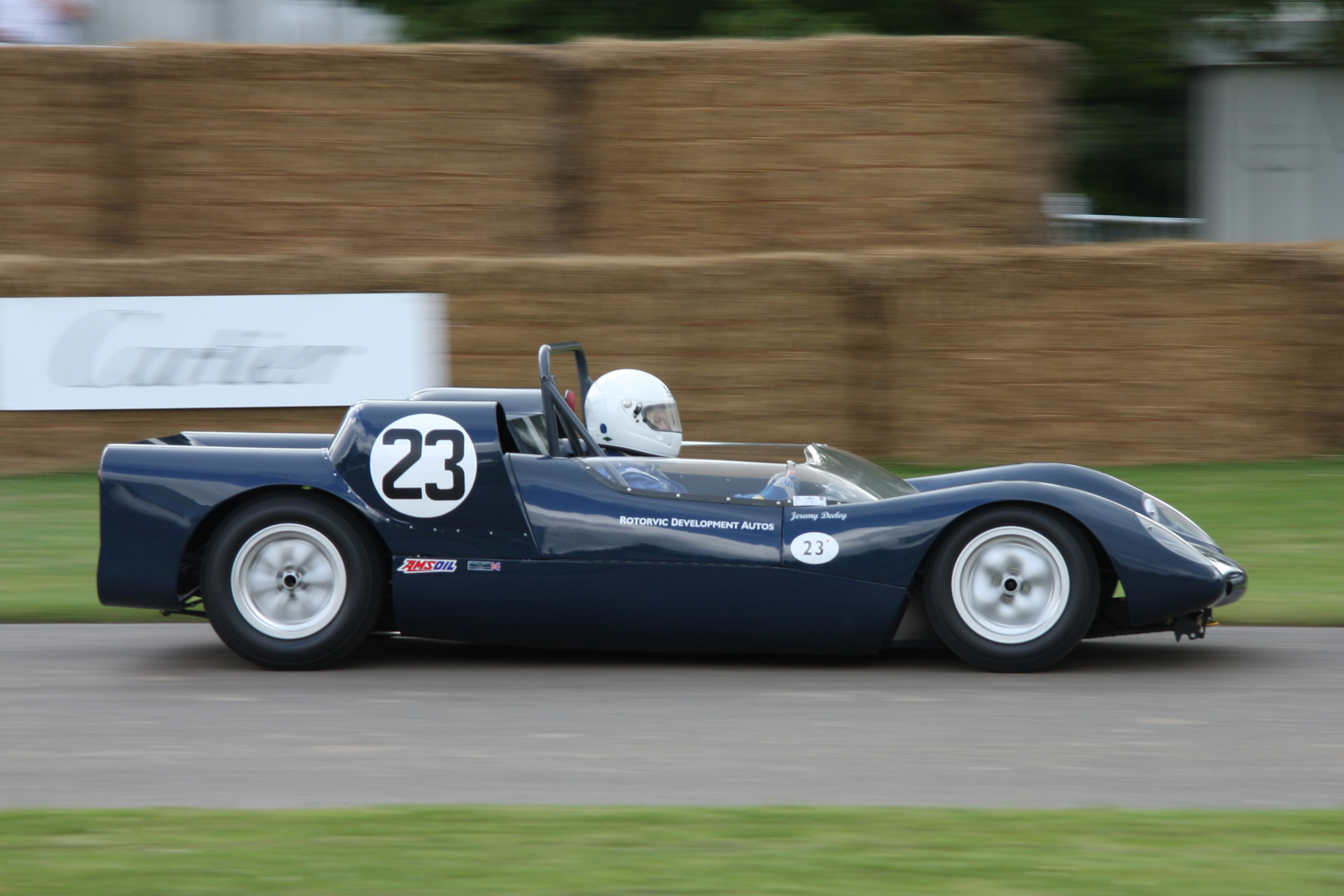
Lotus 23, with 4- and 6-stud wheels just visible

Lotus's main design principle at this time was Chapman's famous maxim, 'Simplicate and add more lightness'. (Note: A quotation that is widely attributed to Chapman, although it actually originates with Gordon Hooton, a designer for the aircraft maker William Stout, whose Stout Scarab would also inspire the Chapman strut.) The Formula Junior Lotus 20 and Lotus 22 extended this to their front wheels, which used a 4-stud fastening, compared to the previous 6-stud that was still used on their rear, driven, wheels.

At the 1963 Le Mans, Lotus entered the new, and somewhat unfinished, Lotus 23, a widened version of the Lotus 22 two-seater. It was disqualified from competition before the race and did not take part. This was on the basis of its wheels, although not specifically due to the wobbly-web design. The car, as designed, used Lotus's typical 6-stud wheel at the rear but a 4-stud mounting at the front. The wheel rims were also wider at the rear, 6" vs. 5", with wider tyres of 5.50×13 rather than 4.50×13. As the rules for Le Mans were still framed as a "sports car" endurance race, they required the carrying of a spare wheel. The 23 had such a spare, but obviously it could not be fitted to both ends of the car. The scrutineers rejected this and barred the car from competition. Matching 4-stud rear hubs were flown hurriedly from England, avoiding the incompatibility problem, but the scrutineers now objected that if 6 studs had been required before, 4 must be inadequately strong and still refused to allow the cars to compete. After this, Chapman replied "We shall never again race at Le Mans.", a promise that Lotus kept until 1997, long after Chapman's death in 1982.

The following year's Can Am sports car, the Lotus 30, switched from wheel studs to centre-lock wheels. This was mostly due to the far greater torque of its large V8 engine, but it also avoided this situation re-occurring, as the 30 also carried a single spare wheel.

=== Spoked wheels ===
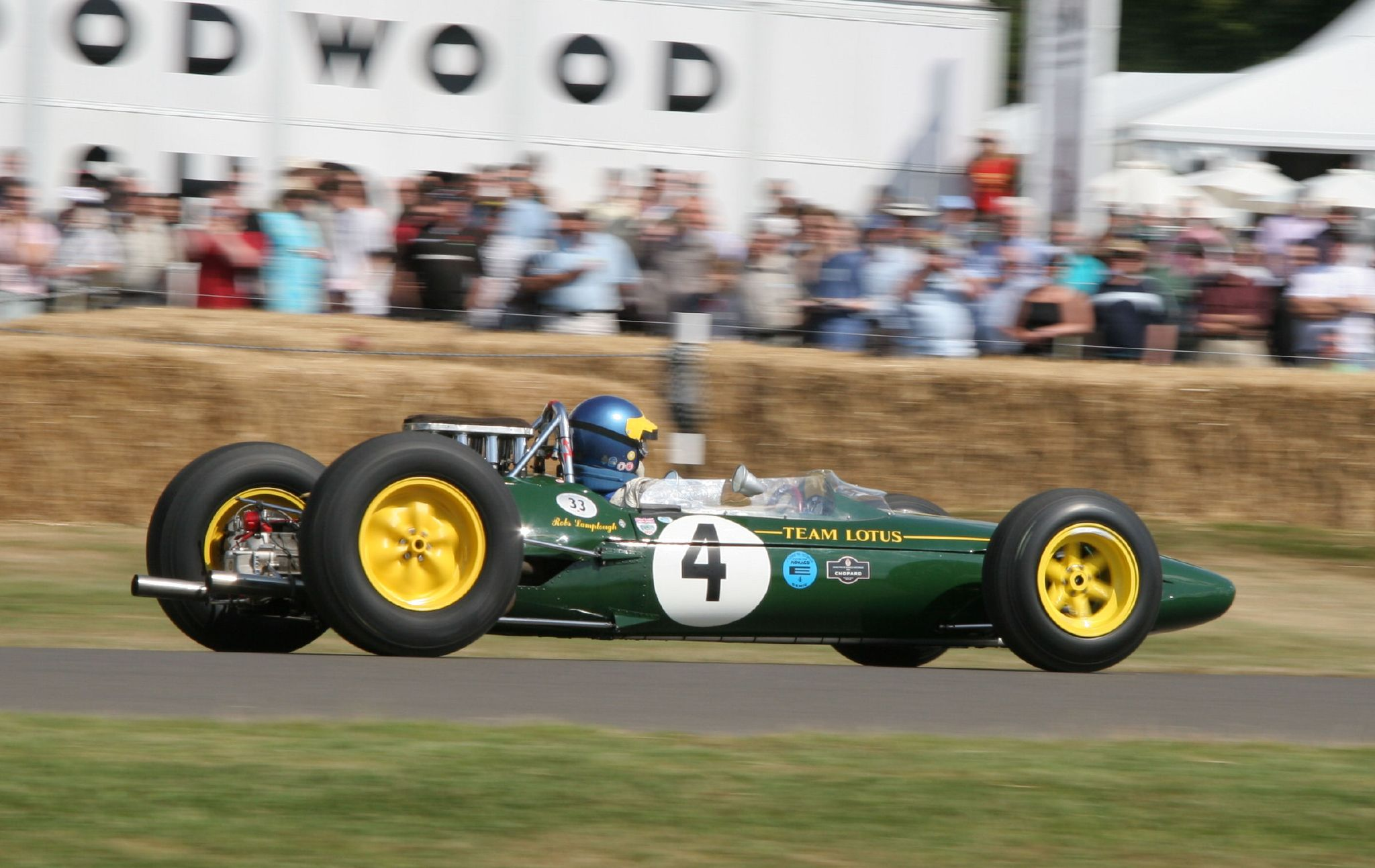
Lotus Climax 33, spoked front wheels and outboard brake discs, with wobbly web rear wheels and inboard discs.

A drawback to the use of a disc wheel, particularly for front wheels, is the lack of airflow through the wheels, which is important for cooling the brake discs. The rear wheels of single-seat racing cars are driven by driveshafts from the transaxle and the brakes are usually mounted inboard in any case, away from the wheels. Later Lotus designs, from the 26 onwards, used spoked wheels, although this was more about the shrinking diameter of racing tyres, especially fronts, rather than brake cooling. With an open-wheel racing car, any shrouding from the wheels was never a serious limitation.

=== Alloy problems ===
As for many articles made from Elektron alloy, corrosion of the magnesium was a problem for long-term service. Even though Lotus only used these wheels on its racing cars, not its road cars, they had a limited service lifetime. Lotus cars of the 1960s are still popular for historic racing, but these wheels are now no longer acceptable for competition scrutineering, regardless of their apparent condition. Since the wheels are such a distinctive part of the car's appearance, there are modern reproductions available.

== See also ==
- Disteel, pressed steel wheels
