= Bulleid Firth Brown wheel =

Type of locomotive wheel used on Britain's Southern Railway

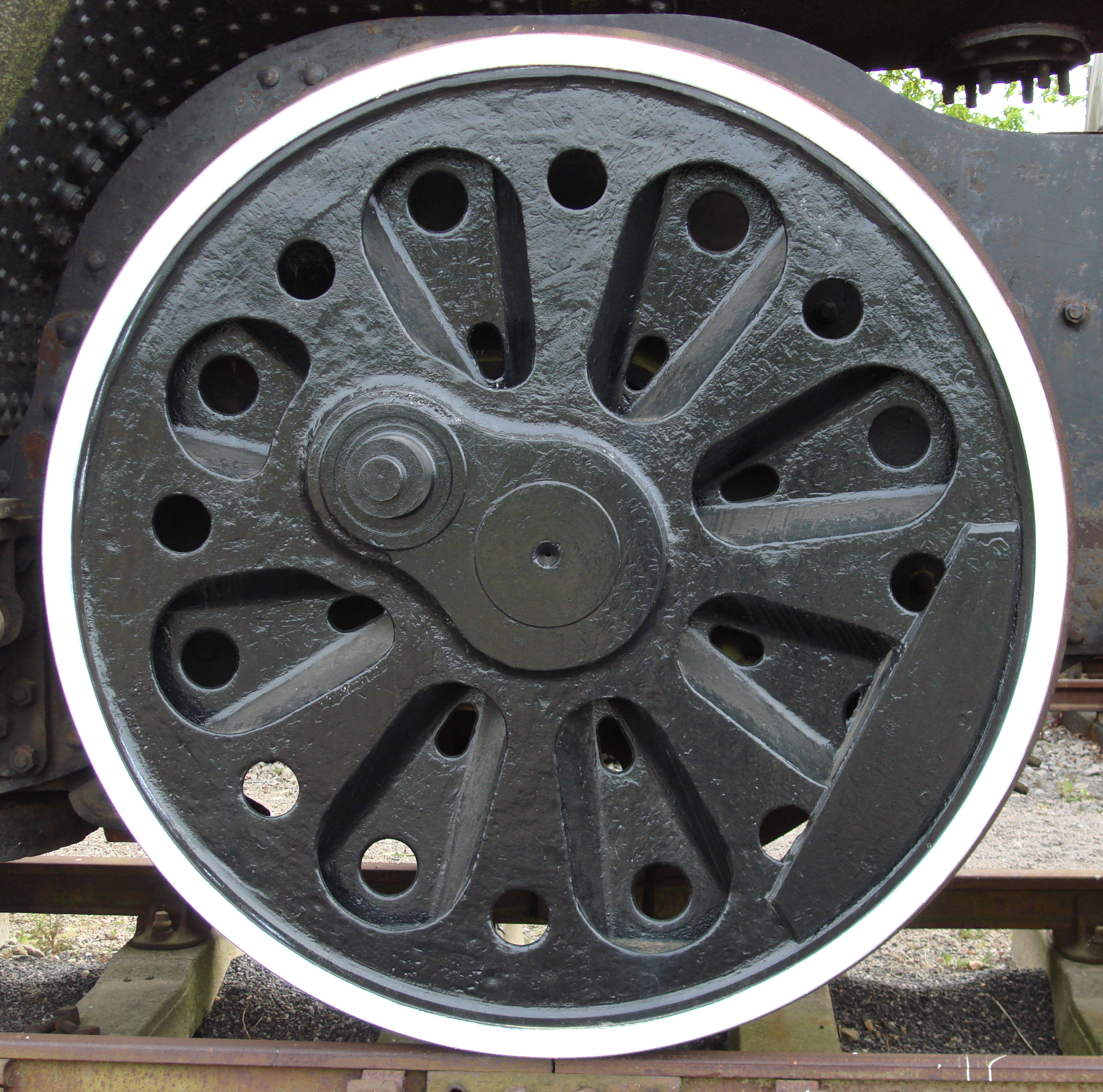
Bulleid Firth Brown (BFB) wheel

The Bulleid Firth Brown wheel (BFB) was a locomotive wheel developed for the Southern Railway in the late 1930s. It was a disc wheel, in contrast to the usual spoked wheels in general use on British railways. The wheel was designed by Oliver Bulleid and developed by the steel company Firth Brown of Sheffield.

== Design ==
The BFB comprises a single disc, with teardrop-shaped indentations to give rigidity, and lightening holes to reduce weight. The advantage over a spoked wheel is that a disc wheel carries the tyre (the metal hoop shrunk onto the wheel to provide contact with the rail) more efficiently; spoked wheels are prone to shrink over time, causing the tyre to work loose, whilst in a disc wheel this is less pronounced. Disc wheels also distribute the weight more evenly, reducing hammer blow on (and thus the damage to) the rail.

In conventional spoked wheels, the tyre is shrunk onto the centre and then locked in place by a retaining 'Gibson ring' at the rear. The BFB pattern avoids this ring, and the risk of it loosening in service. The tyre is turned with a lip in the outer face, then a similar lip at the rear is cold-rolled into place, after the tyre has been mounted.

The BFB weighed about 10 or 12 per cent less than a spoked wheel of the same size.

== Name ==
The Bulleid Firth Brown, or BFB, is sometimes, but inaccurately, referred to as a Boxpok in reference to the wheel used by a number of US railway companies. The BFB is visually similar to the Boxpok, but is of a different design; the Boxpok is composed of sections fixed together to make a hollow shape, while the BFB is cast in a single piece, like a spoked wheel, the shape giving the rigidity needed.

The wheel is named for Firth Brown as well as Bulleid to give equal credit for the design: while the idea was Bulleid's, the development work, and how to cast them, was done by the company. Therefore, both shared the patent. In fact one source gives BFB as meaning Beaumont Firth Brown, referring to the engineer at the firm who oversaw the development.

== History ==
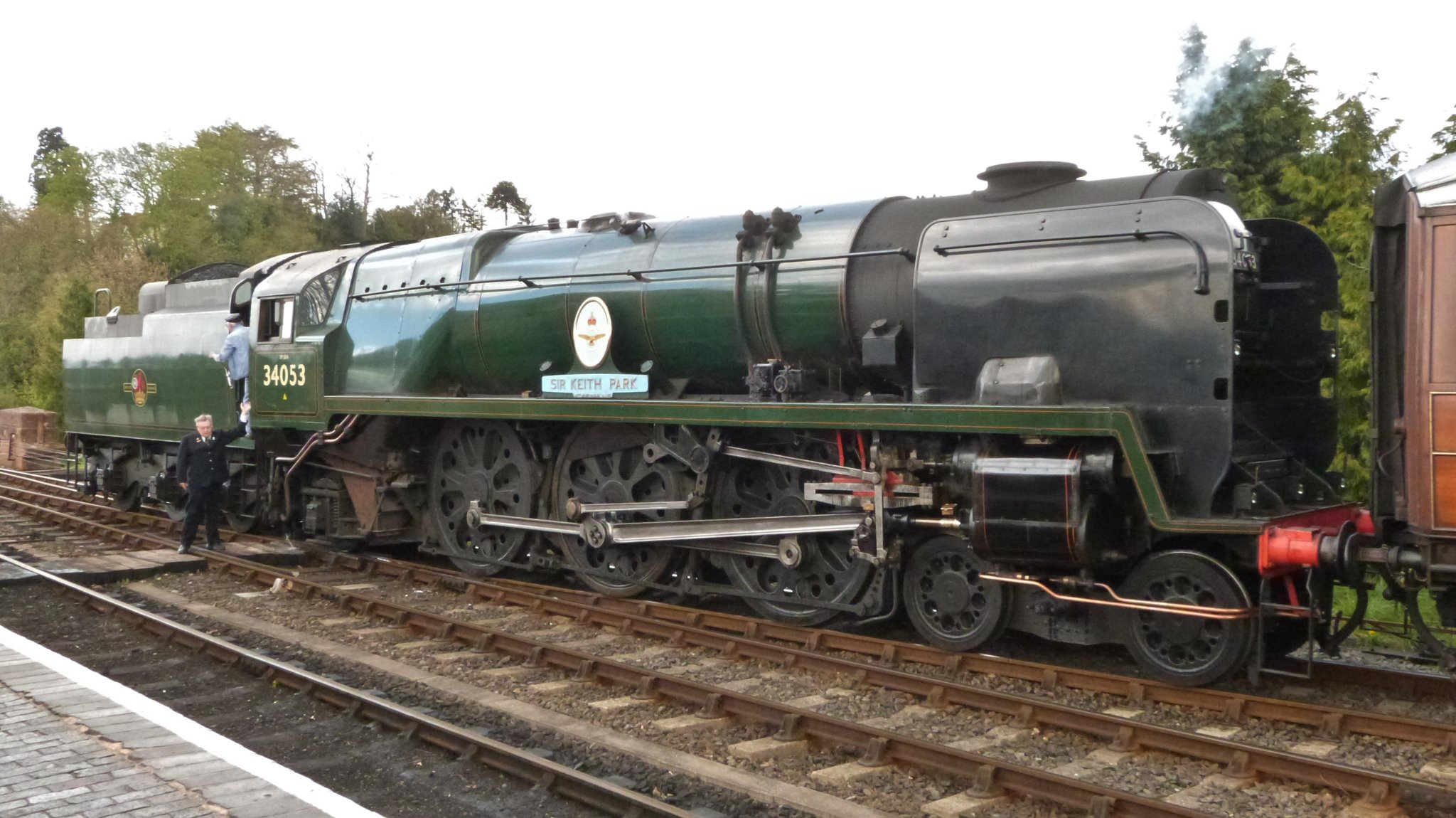
Battle of Britain class 34053 Sir Keith Park

The BFB was developed in 1938 for use on Bulleid's innovative Merchant Navy class of Pacific locomotives. He later used them on all subsequent designs: the Q1 "austerity class" in 1942; his Light Pacifics (the West Country and Battle of Britain classes) in 1945; and his Leader class in 1946. The pacifics also used a similar design of BFB for the non-driving carrying wheels. He also used them in his modifications to the Maunsell Diesel shunters then in use on the Southern.

== Assessment ==
Despite the advantages for which it was designed and well suited, the BFB had a number of drawbacks. It was difficult to maintain, the hollows collected undesired particles like oil, sand and water. In addition, the wheels were found to be prone to cracking, though this was later attributed to the poorer quality of available steel used during and after the Second World War than to some intrinsic design flaw.

The use of the BFB was discontinued in 1948 after the amalgamation of the Southern into British Railways and Bulleid's departure to work for CIE in Ireland. The next generation of steam traction in Britain, e.g. the BR Standards, would all use spoked wheels. Although many of the Bulleid pacifics were rebuilt and major features such as their valvegear replaced, the BFB wheels were retained.

== See also ==
- SCOA-P wheel
- Wobbly-web wheel
