= Chapman strut =

Type of automotive suspension design

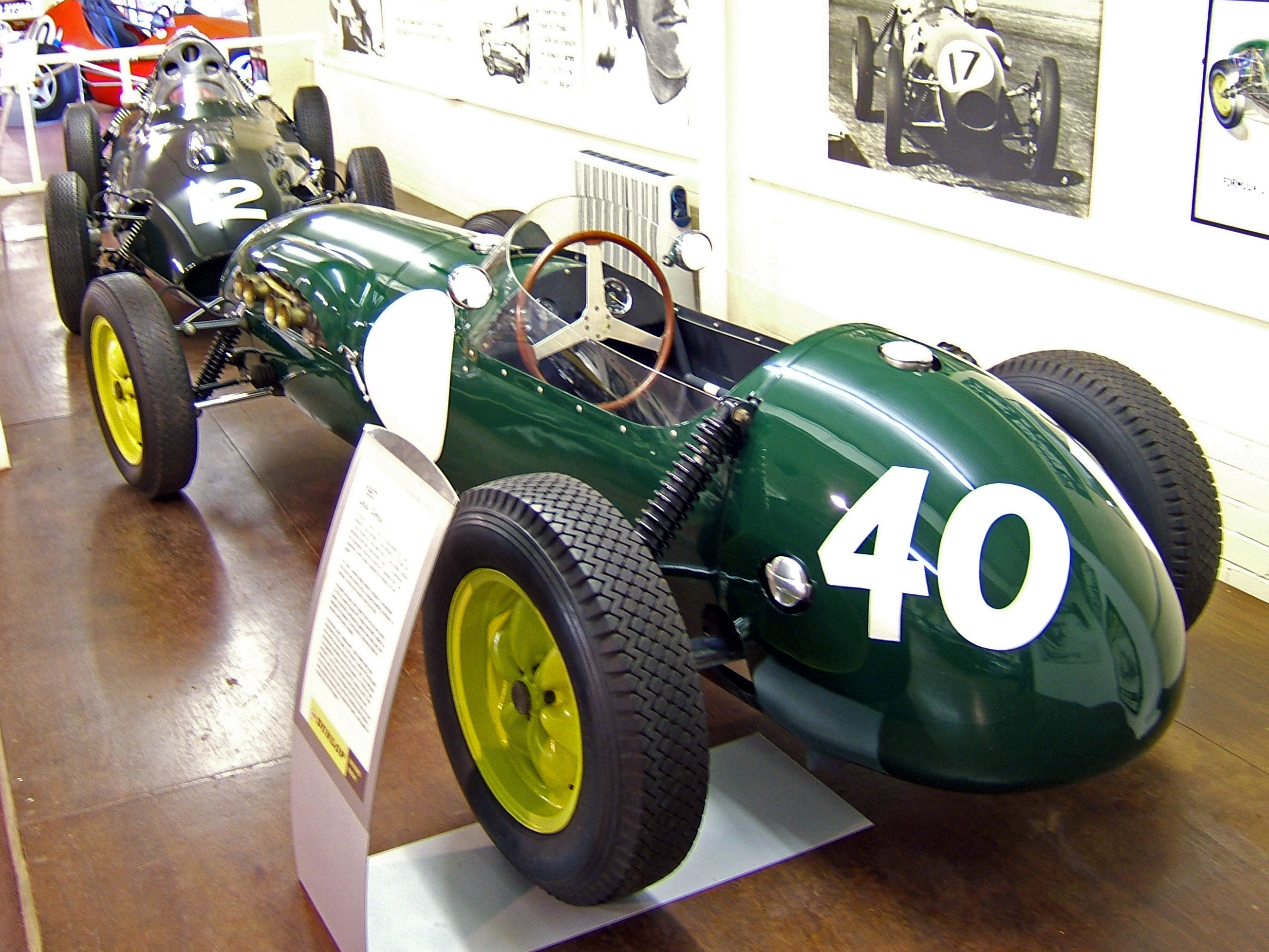
Lotus Twelve

The Chapman strut is a design of independent rear suspension used for light cars, particularly sports and racing cars. It takes its name from, and is best known for its use by, Colin Chapman of Lotus.

The characteristic feature of the Chapman strut is a long upright strut combining a coil spring and shock absorber, with a universal-jointed drive shaft itself forming the lower link of the suspension.

== Origins ==
=== Stout Scarab ===
The design's origin lies with William Stout's 1932 Stout Scarab. This rear-engined car used swing axle independent rear suspension, with long near-vertical coilover struts from high mounting points on the space frame chassis. Stout had also been an aircraft designer and considered that the long-travel oleo struts made, 'the airplane landing gear [is] the easiest type of running gear for comfort yet devised.' The lower ends of the struts were attached to the swing axle casings by swivel bushes. Forward radius rods handled the longitudinal forces.

=== MacPherson strut ===
In 1947 Earle MacPherson patented the MacPherson strut for use on the Chevrolet Cadet. This was the first true strut suspension for cars: the stub axle was rigidly fixed to the strut, thus always keeping the same angle with it, rather than being attached through a swivelling joint as for Stout's Scarab.

MacPherson's strut took advantage of the unitary car bodies appearing in new factories after World War II: the strut requires a high top mounting point, which would be difficult to arrange for a ladder chassis, but is also advantageous for unitary construction as it distributes suspension loads over a greater volume of the bodyshell. New car designs were also lighter and faster than pre-war cars, a cheap mass-production car now having performance that would previously have been the preserve of an expensive sports car. Drivers demanded roadholding and comfort that required independent front suspension. MacPherson's strut was cheap to manufacture and reliable in service, having few moving joints and using the new telescopic shock absorbers, rather than the previous lever arms. MacPherson's strut also integrated an anti-roll bar, not only for control of body roll but also re-using it as an integral part of the suspension and so avoiding the need for a wishbone or radius rod in favour of a simple track control arm.

The MacPherson strut appears to have had little influence on Chapman at this time (although he would later use it unsuccessfully for the front suspension of his Lotus 17). Double wishbone suspension was already well-established for the front of high-performance cars. A front strut would also have required much greater height than was available in a racing car.

=== Goggomobil ===
In 1957, the lightweight Goggomobil used a similar suspension design to the Scarab. Much simpler though, the Goggomobil had bare drive shafts that also acted as the suspension links, with suspension forces passing through the inboard Hooke joints. The swing axle shafts were only carried by the trailing radius rods, rather than an axle casing, and the long struts were shortened to a simple coilover shock absorber.

=== Chapman's design ===
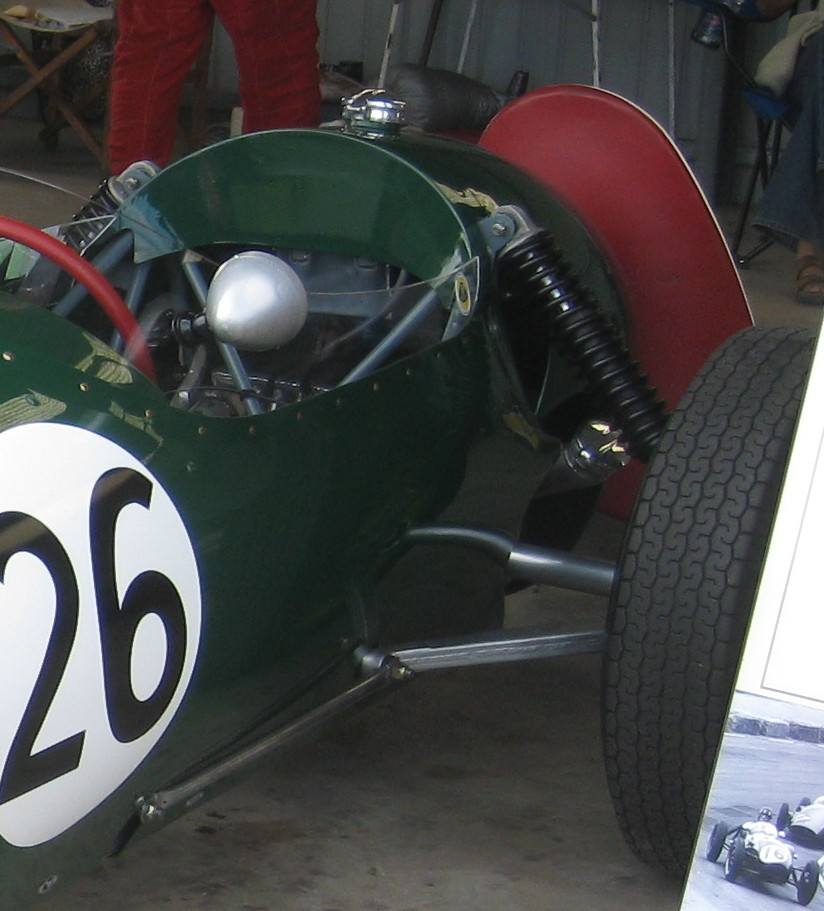
Lotus Twelve. The strut spring, driveshaft below and radius rod can just be seen

In 1956 Chapman was using de Dion rear axles for his Lotus racing cars and also the Vanwall. These had initially used transverse leaf springs, but later changed to coilover shock absorbers. Chapman had identified some of the de Dion's disadvantages as including its high unsprung weight, the need for sliding splines in the rear driveshafts, and also (a typical Chapman fixation) its insensitivity to changes in weight as fuel is consumed. The first Lotus Twelve Formula 2 cars used the same system, although the de Dion's mass was a drawback for a lightweight single-seater racing car.

At a 750 Motor Club meeting in 1957, Chapman saw the Goggomobil system and was impressed by its Lotus-like simplicity and light weight. The use of the drive shafts for both drive and as a suspension component appealed to Chapman, who always favoured solutions that could make one component do double duty.

Chapman struts were introduced in Lotus' first single-seater car, the Lotus Twelve. This was developed as a 1.5-litre Formula 2 in 1957, but re-engined in 1958 it also competed in Formula 1. This same car also introduced Lotus' wobbly-web wheel.

There were two differences from these precursors to the Chapman strut. As the Lotus Twelve had inboard disk brakes, there was no need to pass the braking torque through the radius rods. Chapman also avoided the swing axle and its camber changes with suspension travel, in favour of a drive shaft with two universal joints. The connection between the hub carrier and the shock absorber base was made rigid, making the spring unit into a strut and also controlling the camber angle. Using the drive shaft itself to control the rear track meant that the shaft could be of fixed length, avoiding the need for a sliding spline joint and its stiction problems.

Chapman applied for a patent on his strut design on 13 June 1957.

The Chapman strut also appeared on the Lotus Sixteen of 1958. In 1959 this design was revised to use a lower wishbone. This in turn required a return to a sliding joint in the drive shaft.

== Comparison to the MacPherson strut ==
The Chapman strut is often confused with the MacPherson strut, as both use a near-vertical upper strut, The distinction is that the MacPherson strut always requires a lower track control arm (Note: Although some strut suspensions use lower wishbones, MacPherson's patent covered the use of the anti-roll bar for longitudinal control as well, thus allowing a simpler one-bearing track control arm, rather than a broad-based wishbone with two inner bearings.) where the Chapman uses the drive shaft and a light radius rod.

As it requires a drive shaft, the Chapman strut can only be used at the driven end of the vehicle. For the Lotus designs to which it was applied, this was their rear. MacPherson struts are most commonly used for front suspension and the strut axis forms the kingpin bearing, for steering movement. There is little reason why a Chapman strut could not be used similarly, although there is no record of this being tried on a front-wheel or four-wheel drive car. Both designs are struts, where the strut base is rigidly attached to the hub carrier.

Chapman did use MacPherson struts for the front suspension of the Lotus 17. These were unsuccessful, owing to the stiction problems that Chapman had worked to avoid with the sliding drive shaft joint. A wishbone conversion kit was later developed by ex-Lotus engineer Len Terry.

== Applications ==
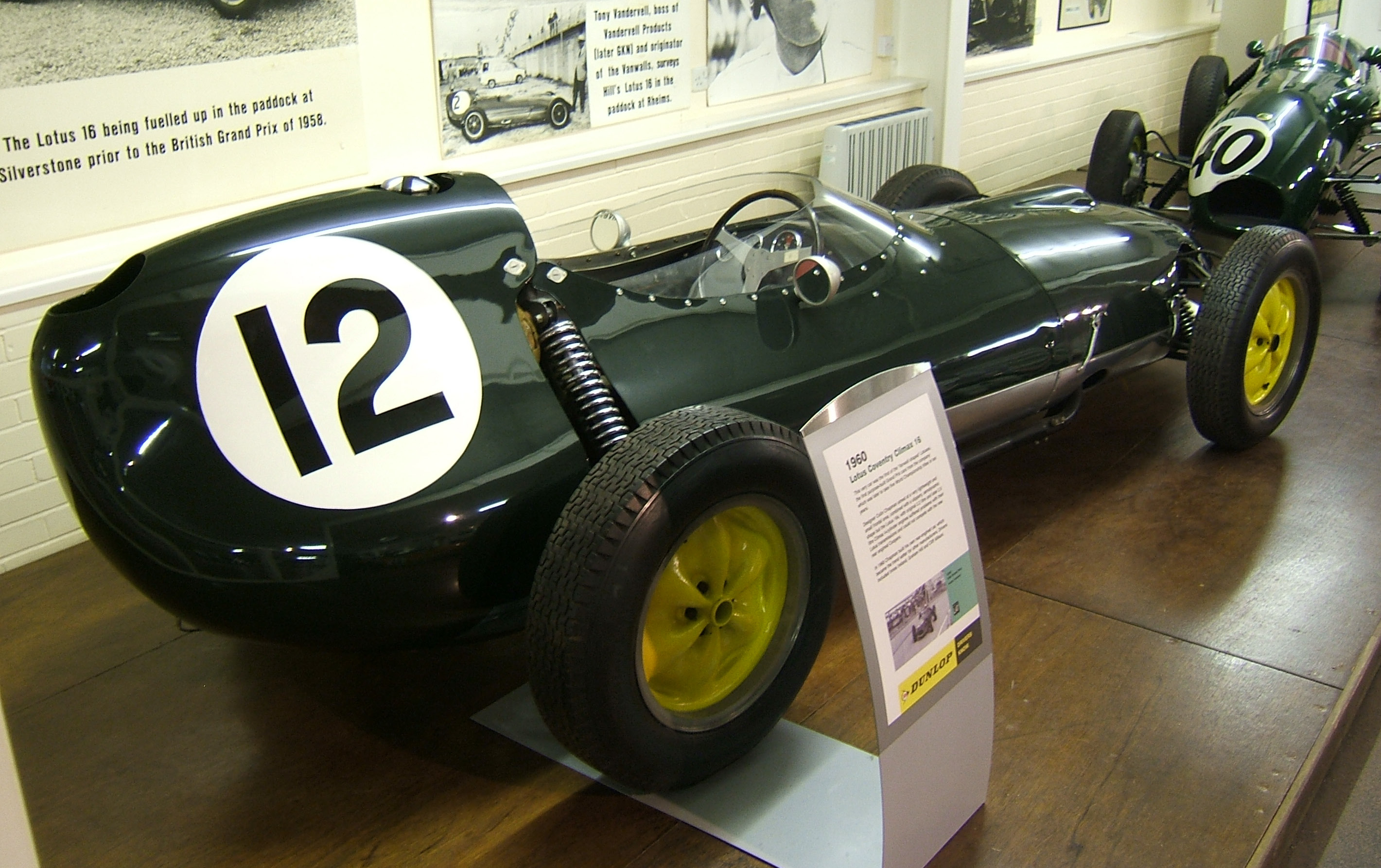
Lotus 16 Grand Prix car Note the height of the rear strut

=== Racing cars ===
- Lotus Twelve
- Lotus 15
- Lotus Sixteen
- Lotus 17

=== Road cars ===
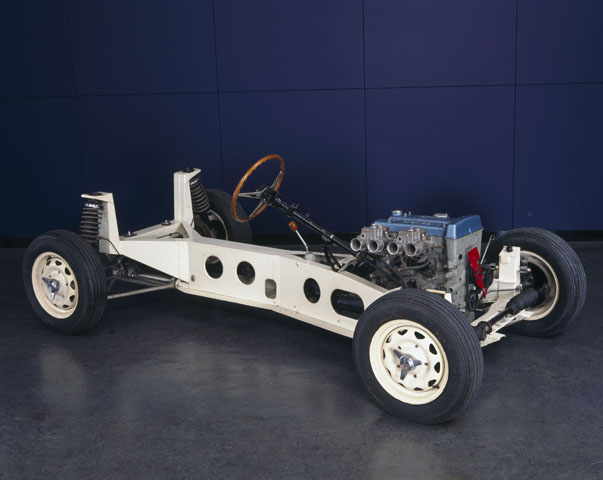
Lotus Elan backbone chassis

Lotus road cars after the Twelve also used the Chapman strut for rear suspension. These included the fibreglass platform-chassis Elite and the backbone chassis Elan. Chapman struts, and their wide separation of load paths into the chassis, were a good fit to a stressed-skin structure such as the Elite and may have been an influence on its choice. They were less appropriate for a backbone chassis, requiring broad outriggers to carry the strut top loads, an un-Chapman-like feature that added weight for only a single purpose and was difficult to make stiff enough. It has been suggested that the spring forces from these struts would have been better supported as torsion bars, which could then have been anchored to the main suspension spine. (Note: Porsche used something similar with the early 911, where the front MacPherson struts were supported by torsion bars into its platform chassis, rather than the monocoque of the front wings.)

The mid-engined Europa used a modified version of the Chapman strut. Owing to the need to isolate the engine and transaxle from the chassis in order to reduce noise and vibration, the rubber mounts led to an excessive sideways movement of the driveshafts. In this case, sideways location of the hubs was controlled by an enlarged diagonal radius rod to the front. Rubber sandwich mounts were developed that allowed vertical movement whilst controlling lateral movement. Similar vibration problems were encountered with the Elite, but as these only had the vibration of the differential to control rather than engine vibration, it could be managed by suitable design of the rubber mounts.

- Lotus Elite (Lotus 14)
- Lotus Elan
- Lotus Europa

== Successor designs ==
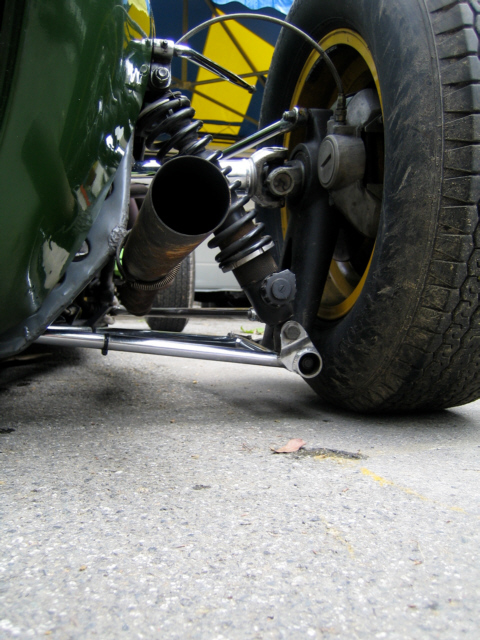
Lotus 18 with wishbone suspension

The successful mid-engined Lotus 18 of 1960 no longer had the high bodywork behind the driver's seat on which to mount the tops of the struts. Instead it used a wishbone rear suspension with wide-based tube lower wishbones carrying coilover shocks. The upper wishbones though were, once again in the style of the Chapman strut, using the driveshafts themselves and a front radius rod. This is similar to the Jaguar independent rear suspension, which also uses the driveshafts as an upper control arm.

The 2016 all wheel drive version of the Fiat 500X crossover based on the Jeep Renegade uses multi-link Chapman strut suspension at the rear, with MacPherson struts at the front. (Note: Although some sources describe it as having MacPherson at both ends.) Although the driveshafts are a suspension link, making this a Chapman strut, there are additional transverse links as well.
