= Lightening holes =

Holes added to materials to make them lighter without reducing strength

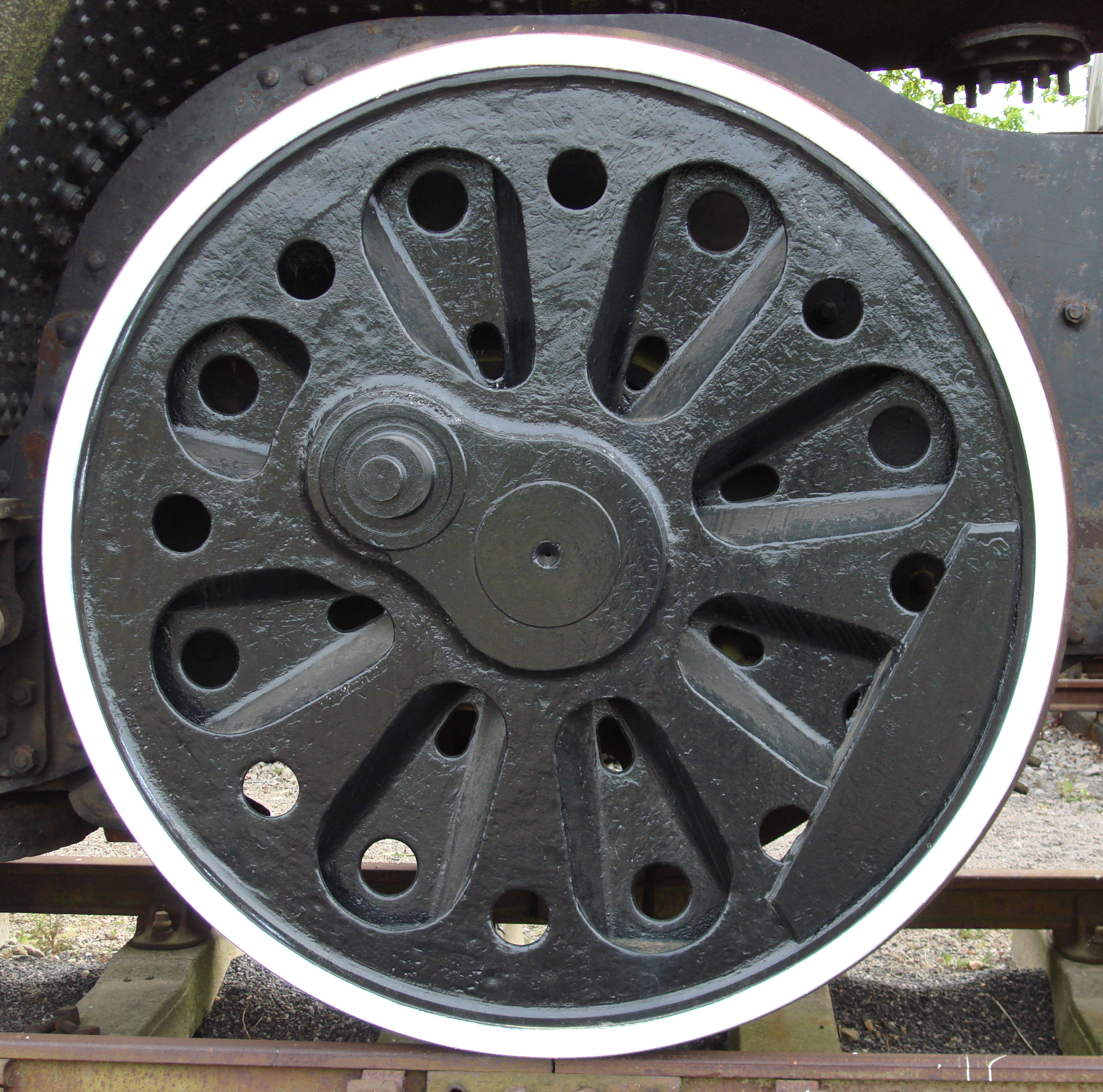
Lightening holes in Bulleid Firth Brown (BFB) railway locomotive wheel

Lightening holes are holes in structural components of machines and buildings used by a variety of engineering disciplines to make structures lighter. The edges of the hole may be flanged to increase the rigidity and strength of the component. The holes can be circular, triangular, elliptical, or rectangular and should have rounded edges, but they should never have sharp corners, to avoid the risk of stress risers, and they must not be too close to the edge of a structural component.

== Usage ==
=== Aviation ===
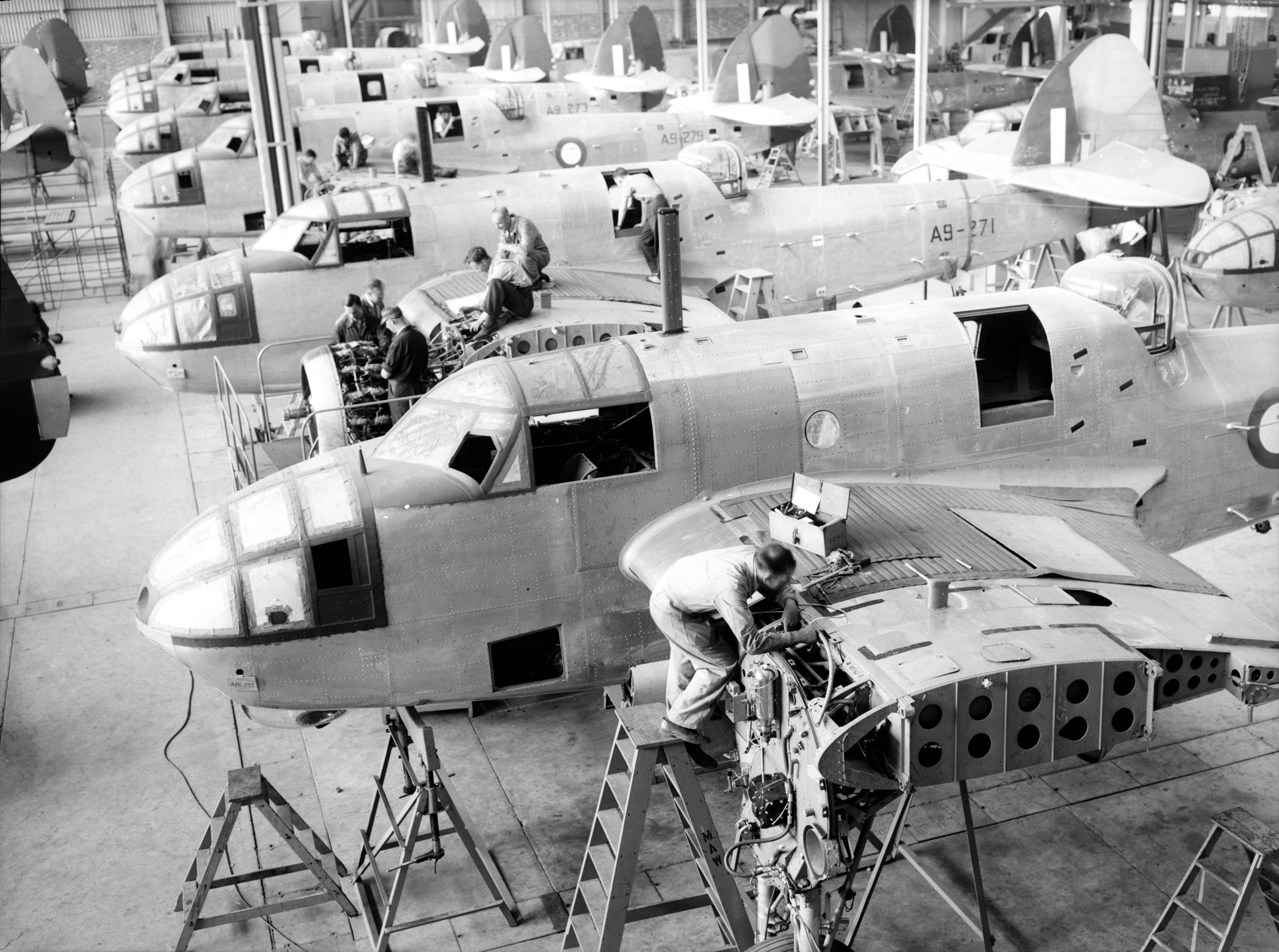
Aircraft manufacturing in Australia 1943. Note the circular lightening holes in the wing ribs.

Lightening holes are often used in the aviation industry. This allows an aircraft to be as lightweight as possible, retaining the durability and airworthiness of the aircraft structure.

=== Maritime ===
Lightening holes have also been used in marine engineering to increase seaworthiness of the vessel.

=== Motorsports ===
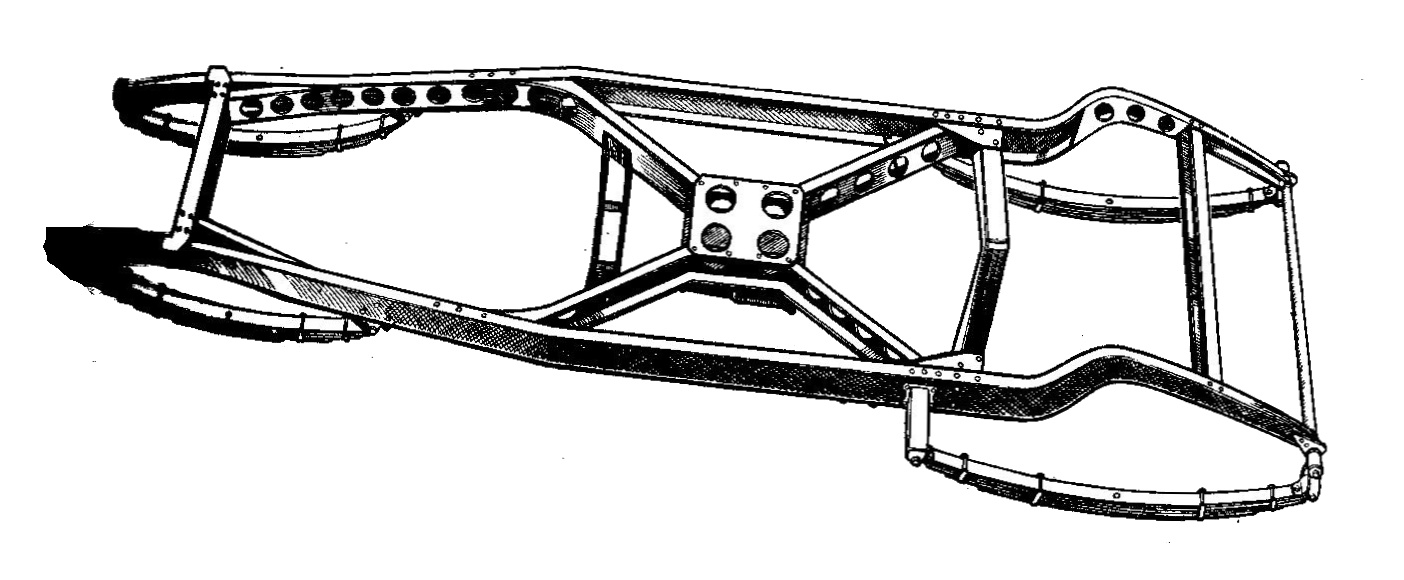
Car chassis with lightening holes, circa 1935.

Lightening holes became a prominent feature of motor racing in the 1920s and 1930s. Chassis members, suspension components, engine housings and even connecting rods were drilled with a range of holes, of sizes almost as large as the component.

"[The] wisdom of the day was to make everything along the lines of a brick shithouse [...] and then drill holes in the bits to lighten them."

— David Kelsey, Lotus Cars

=== Military ===
Lightening holes have been used in various military vehicles, aircraft, equipment and weaponry platforms. This allows equipment to be lighter in weight as well as increase the ruggedness and durability. They are usually made by drilling holes, pressed stamping or machining and can also save strategic materials and cost during wartime production.

=== Architecture ===
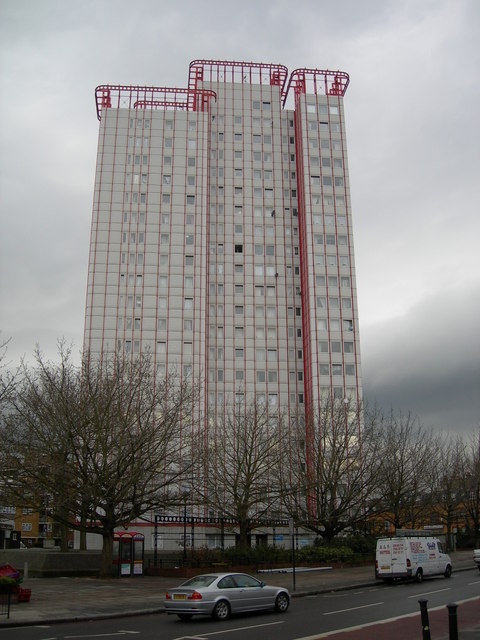
Parsons House is an example of the use of lightening holes in architecture.

Lightening holes have been used on various architecture designs. During the 1980s and early 1990s, lightening holes were fashionable and somewhat seen as futuristic and were used in the likes of industrial units, car showrooms, shopping precincts, sports centres etc. Parsons House in London is a notable building that uses lightening holes since its renovation in 1988. Ringwood Health & Leisure Centre in Hampshire is another notable example.

== See also ==
- Honeycomb structure
- Hollow structural section
- Isogrid
- Truss
- Fuller (groove)
