= Lotus 17 =

Sports car built by lotus cars in the year 1959

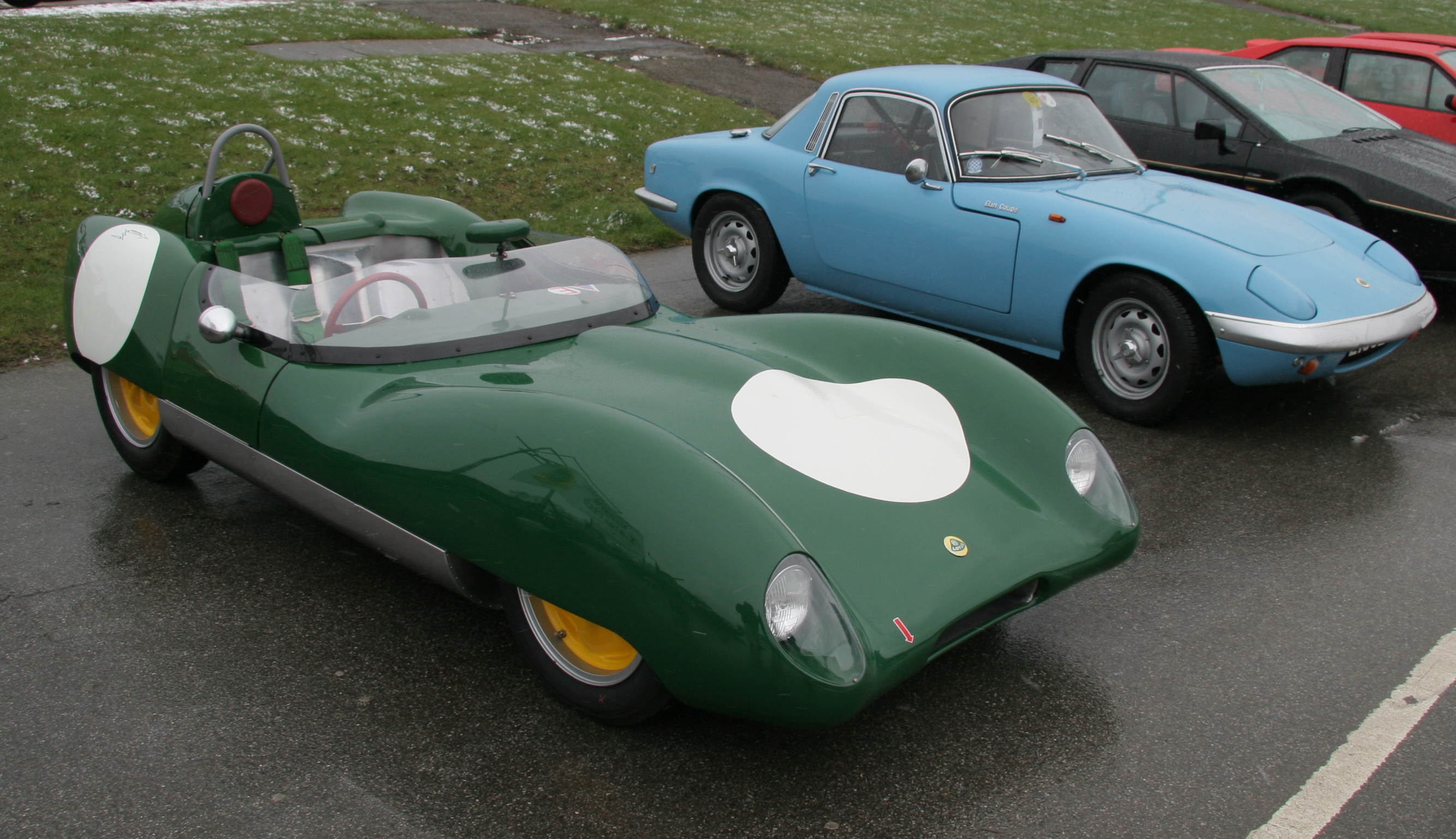
Lotus 17

The Lotus 17 was a sports car racing model built by Lotus Cars in 1959. Designed by Len Terry, it was built in response to the Lola Mk1 which was dominant against the previous Lotus model, the Eleven. It was replaced in 1960 by the Lotus 19.

The Lotus 17 was Chapman's answer to the Lola Mk 1, which by late 1958, was beating the venerable (but by then a good few years old) Eleven with monotonous regularity. The Lola was smaller and lighter than the Eleven, and so Chapman's riposte was even smaller, even lighter, even more aerodynamic.

It was designed by Len Terry based on Chapman's ideas and it incorporated a number of new features, although in fact was the last front-engined sports racing car Lotus made. Its rear suspension was the Chapman strut, first used on the single seat Lotus Twelve, the Elite Coupe and the Lotus 15. It was Lotus's first glass fibre-bodied sports racing car (although the Works Elevens had fibreglass bodies in 1958), had a very low frontal area and the lightest weight of any multi-seat production Lotus ever made. The declared (albeit dry) weight was 340 kg (750lb). (17s nowadays struggle to get below a wet 400 kg (880lb)). It should have been a very effective weapon.

But at its first race in early April 1959, it became apparent that the handling was flawed, with the front struts bending and binding under racing loads. By the time the problem had been identified and rectified by the substitution of the front struts by more conventional wishbones (which was subsequently offered as a factory modification to all 17 owners), it was all too late and racing had moved on.

Only 21 cars were actually produced. Of these, about a dozen exist today, and it is only now, in modern historic racing where two cars race in Europe and two in the US, that their potential is being realised.

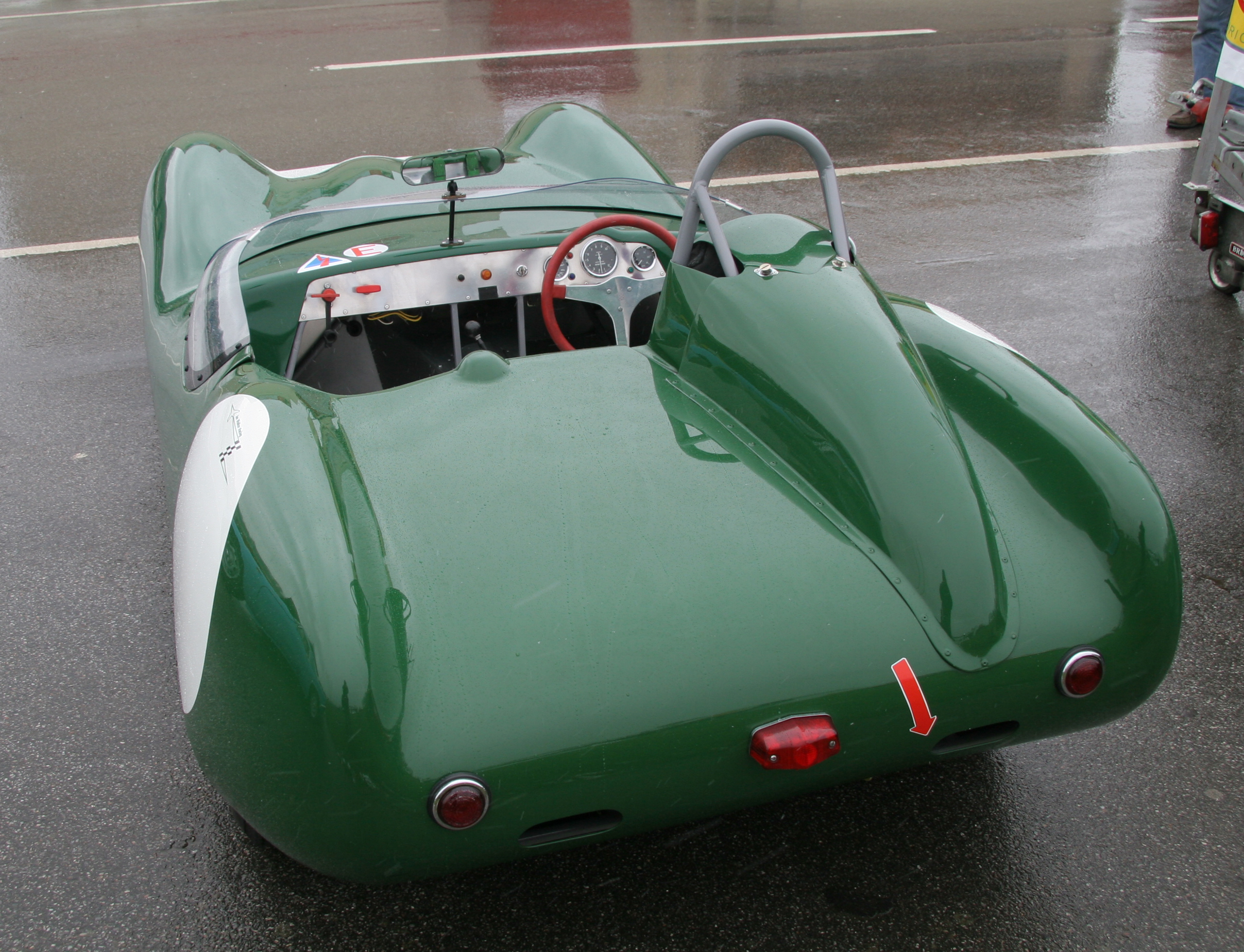
Rear view of Lotus 17

Engine-wise, 17s ran in period with all the small capacity Coventry Climax options, 742 cc FWMA (as in the works 1959 Le Mans entries, which were going very well in class until electrical problems forced their retirement), 1,098 cc FWA (the normal small capacity racing class of the day), 1,216 cc FWE and (in North America) 1460cc. Nowadays, they usually run with the 1,216 cc FWE engine, although the US cars now usually run with the 1460 cc FWB.
