= Karl-Heinz Rehkopf =

German businessman and collector

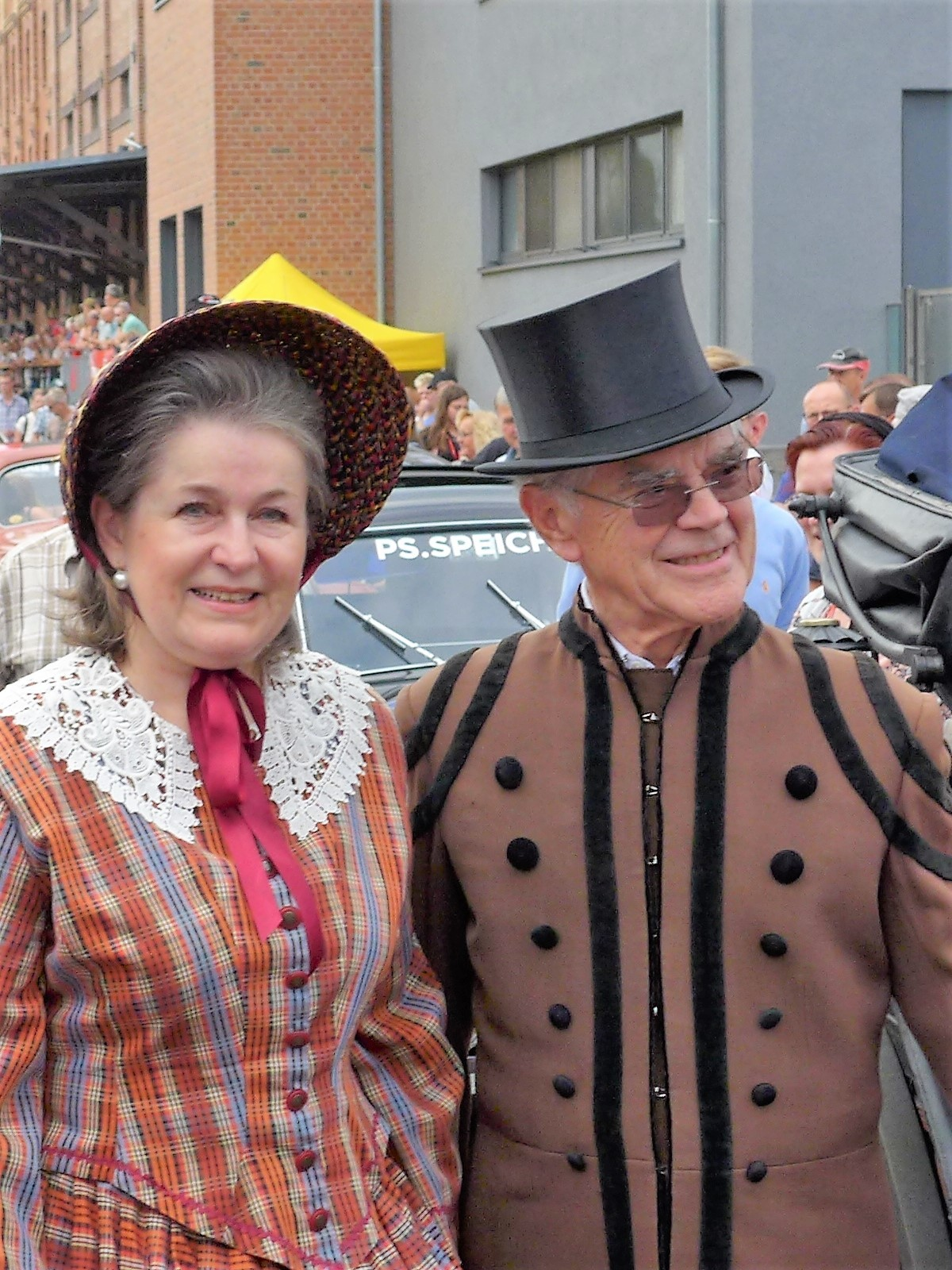
Rehkopf and his wife in 2019

Karl-Heinz Rehkopf (born 7 December 1936) is a German self-made businessman-entrepreneur and collector.

Not able to afford a car, he bought his first motorbike, a fourteen year old Victoria V99, in 1952. It was the start of a collection which now extends to more than 1,200 two wheelers. In 2014 the foundation which he had established in 2009 opened in a converted granary in the little town of Einbeck, the so-called PS Speicher, described in some sources as a multi-storey motor museum. In its own publicity material it is described as "not a museum in the classical sense, but an interactive experience that thrills its visitors and seeks to offer constantly new experiences through special exhibitions and changing presentations ...".

== Biography ==
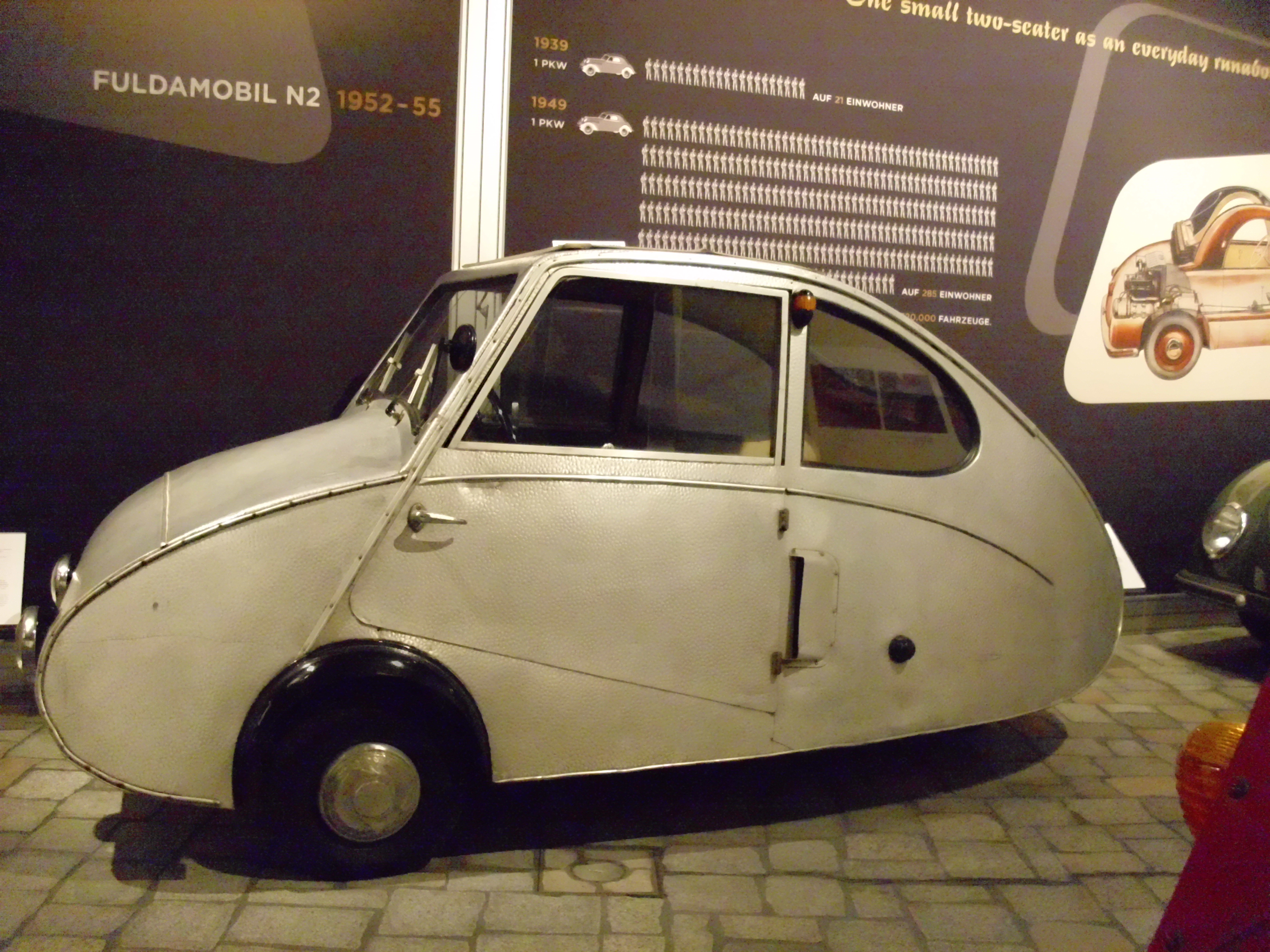
Fuldamobil N-2 in the PS Speicher (motorbike and automobile museum)

Rehkopf was born and grew up in Fredelsloh, a picturesque village in the hills between Hanover and Kassel. His father was the manager of the small dairy which his parents ran together. There was an awareness, as he grew up, that the family was not wealthy. Nevertheless, by the time he was 11, in 1947, his father had acquired a car, and he would later recall that thanks to the reassuringly indulgent approach of the local policemen, even at the age of eleven he enjoyed being permitted to steer and later, long before reaching the legal minimum driving age of 18, drive his father's prewar Opel, provided he did not stray outside the village. Around the time he was 20 his father died. In any event, he always had to work in order to support himself first in order to buy his first motor-bike "to impress the girls", then to obtain a qualification in business administration and later to support his young family. In 1961 – reportedly on a whim – he and his first wife took over the village store in the nearby village of Elliehausen. He had purchased the motorbike in 1952 for 100 Marks. It was a 1938 Victoria V99.

In 1972 Rehkopf teamed up with Rainer Wunderlich to establish "Teppich-Domäne Harste" ("loosely, "Carpet World Hartse""), a discount retailer of carpet-tiles and other floor coverings and furnishings. The business was installed in buildings previously used to accommodate cattle, pigs and horses, while the manor house was adapted for administrative use, on a former landed estate in the village of Harste, not far from Göttingen. Forty-five years later, rebranded in 2007 as "tedox", the range had expanded, but with the focus still on home furnishing and redecoration. Around the same time the Rehkopf family withdrew from active involvement in the firm. There are now (2017) more than 100 retail outlets and approximately 2,800 employees.

In 2009 Karl-Heinz Rehkopf set up the "Kulturstiftung Kornhaus" (literally, "Grain Silo arts foundation") in the little town of Einbeck, introducing into it 40 Million Euros of his own money. The project for which the foundation had been created involved converting the PS Speicher, a brick-built grain silo constructed to the west of the town (but subsequently subsumed into it) in the 1890s. Between 2012 and 2014 the structure was thoroughly cleaned and the interior reconfigured. On 23 July 2014 it opened as a modern museum of cars and motorbikes produced during the preceding 130 years. Most of the 2,000 old-timer bikes and cars were initially from Rehkopf's own collection. In April 2015 a press release announced that during its first nine months as a "museum" the PS Speicher had attracted 50,000 visitors. The announcement was accompanied by a picture of a surprised but happy family from Korbach, the wife clutching a large bouquet of flowers and the daughter a large bag of free souvenirs, with the museum director Alexander Fillies looking on. It was not clear from the press release which of the five family members was visitor number 50,000.

Beyond the PS Speicher project, Rehkopf has made numerous philanthropic donations. On 7 December 2016, his eightieth birthday, in the presence of around 500 guests, Sabine Michalek, the mayor of Einbeck awarded him the town's "ring of honour", the highest award in her gift. Those who were there to congratulate him included Bernd Busemann, vice-president of the regional parliament ("Landtag")

== Personal life ==
From his first marriage Rehkopf has two sons and one daughter. In 2004 he married, as his second wife, the Berlin art historian Gabriele Rehkopf-Adt.
