= Weser-Harz-Heide Cycle Route =

The Weser-Harz-Heide Cycle Route (German: Weser-Harz-Heide-Radfernweg), which is Lower Saxony route no. 5, is a 397 km long-distance cycle path that runs from Hann. Münden, the source of the Weser, over the Harz mountains into the Lüneburg Heath in North Germany.

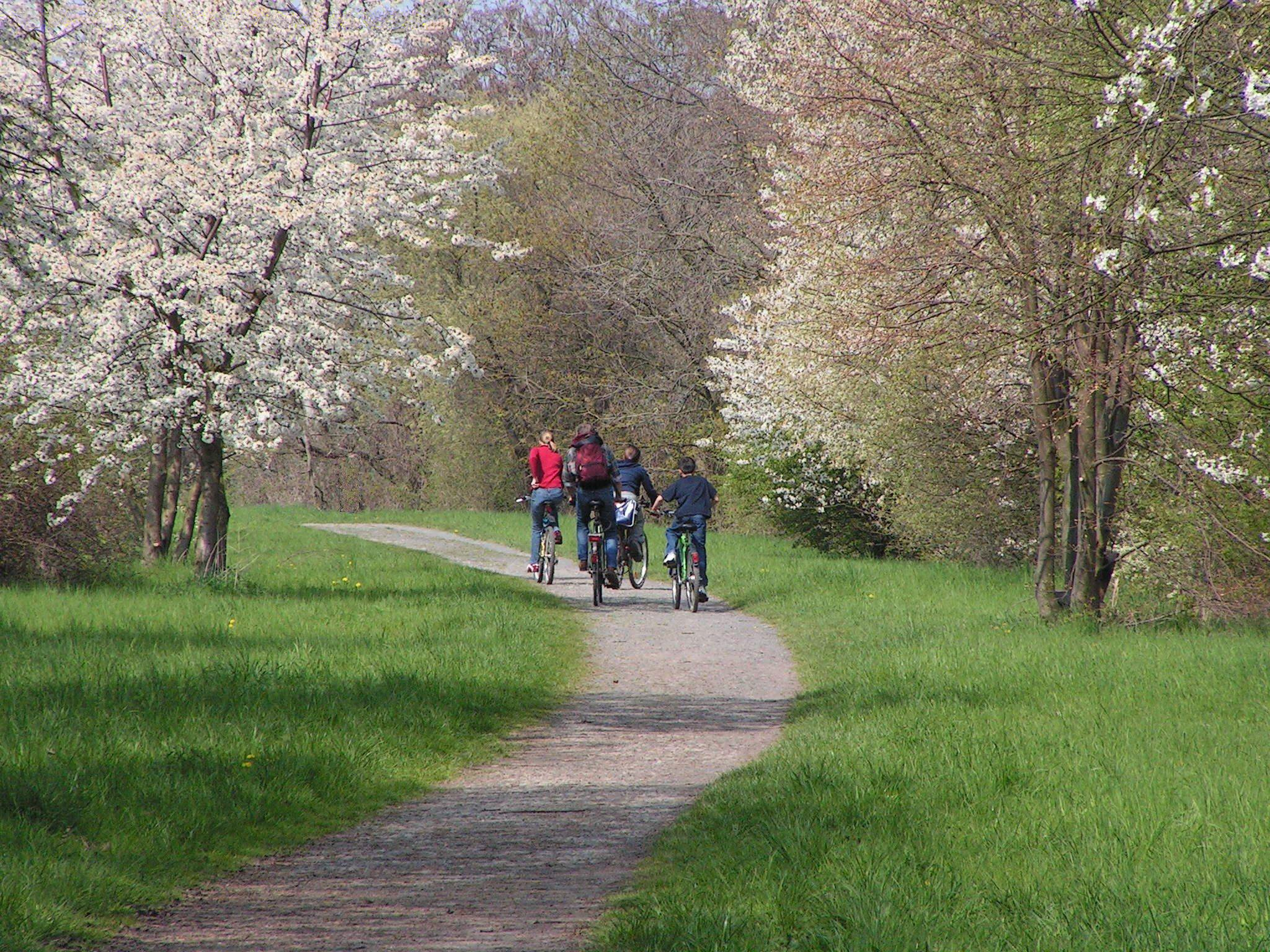
The Weser-Harz-Heide cycle route on the old Dransfeld Railway near Groß Ellershausen (Göttingen)

== Route ==
The Weser-Harz-Heide cycle route begins in Hann. Münden and runs through Dransfeld, Göttingen, Rosdorf, Reinhausen, Duderstadt, past the Rhumequelle, and on via Osterode am Harz, Altenau, Clausthal-Zellerfeld, Goslar, Braunschweig, Gifhorn and Uelzen to Lüneburg.

It links the Weser Path, the Leine-Heide Cycle Path and Europaroute R1 near Goslar sharing the same route in places. Between Goslar and Hann. Münden the cycle path runs mostly on old railway trackbeds, such as that of the Innerste Valley Railway, the Herzberg-Bleicherode railway, the Garte Valley Railway and the Dransfeld Ramp.
