= Leine-Heide Cycle Path =

Cycle route in Germany

Coordinates: 53.3715°N 9.8256°E

The Leine-Heide Cycle Path (German: Leine-Heide-Radweg) is a long-distance cycle path in Germany that has a total length of 410 kilometres (250 mi) and runs through the German federal states of Thuringia, Lower Saxony and Hamburg. Until 2009, it was called the Leine Cycle Path, after the River Leine; it ended north of the river's confluence with the Aller in Hodenhagen. Heide (‘heath’) refers to the Lüneburg Heath.

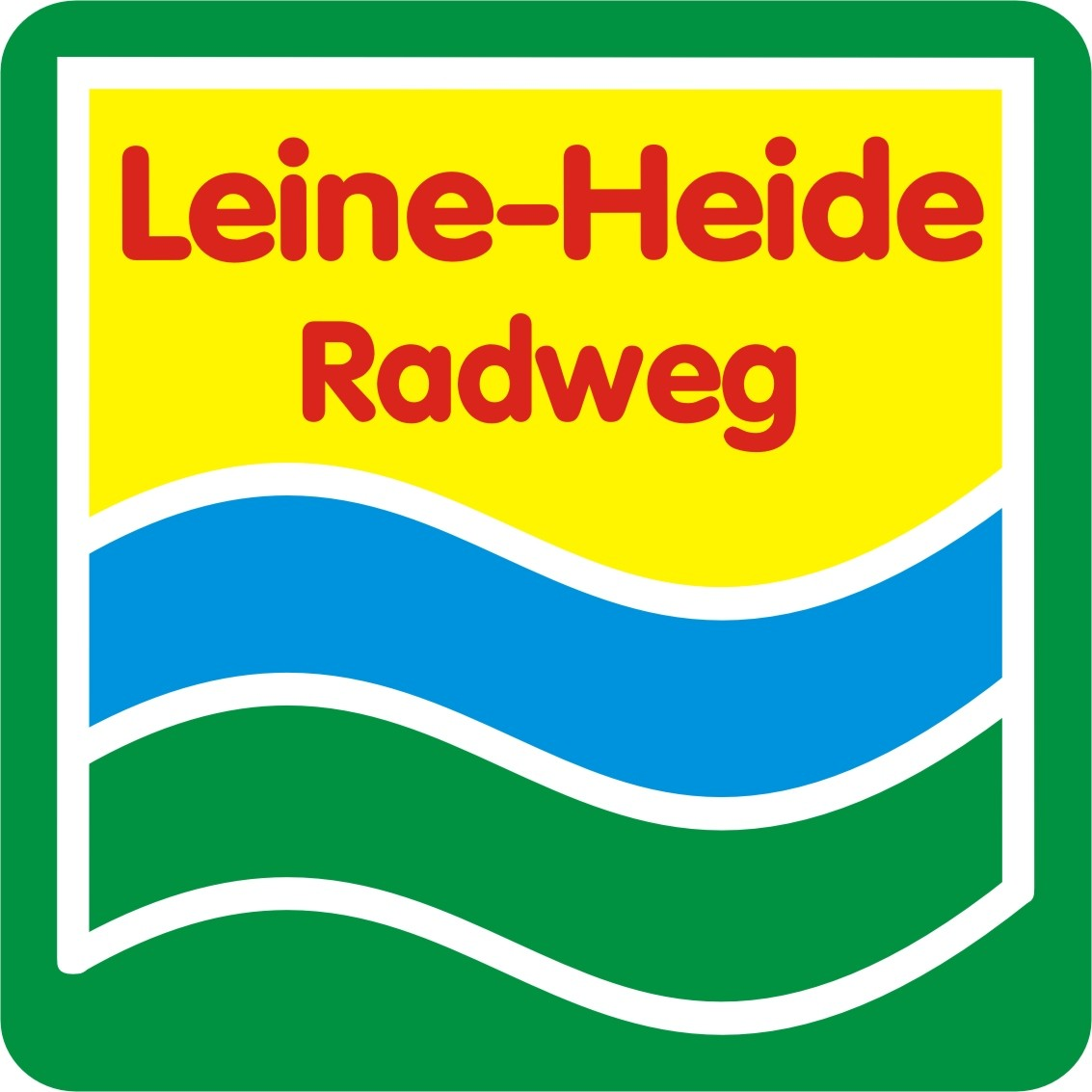
Logo of the cycle path

== Brief description ==
The cycle path starts in Leinefelde (Thuringia) and ends in the city of Hamburg, passing through the following places: Heiligenstadt, Göttingen, Northeim, Einbeck, Kreiensen, Freden (Leine), Alfeld, Gronau, Sarstedt, Hanover, Neustadt am Rübenberge, Schwarmstedt, Walsrode, Soltau, Schneverdingen, Buchholz in der Nordheide.

== Route ==
The Leine-Heide Cycle Path starts at the source of the river Leine near Leinefelde in the Thuringian region of Eichsfeld and ends in Hamburg's old town (Altstadt). It follows the course of the Leine usually at a distance of a few hundred metres; but in several places, it runs close by and alongside the river. As a result, the path has few inclines. After the Leine discharges into the Aller, the route follows the course of the Aller and then swings east near Ahlden. After crossing the Aller, it runs through the Lüneburg Heath to Hamburg.

== Landscape and points of interest ==
The Leine-Heide Cycle Path links the hill country of the Leine Uplands with the Lüneburg Heath and the Hanseatic city of Hamburg.

=== Leine Uplands and Leine valley ===
The path begins in the south at the source of the Leine near Leinefelde in Thuringia's Eichsfeld region. Forested ridges, scattered orchards and small towns, some with historic buildings are characteristic of this thousand-year-old cultural landscape.

The route passes through the gently rolling river landscape, crosses the old Inner German Border near Besenhausen Manor and runs to the Friedland Border Camp. Around 20 km further north, the path reaches the university town of Göttingen, with its many points of interest. The castle of Plesse near Bovenden has a wide view from its tower.

Beyond the timber-framed town of Northeim is the Northeim Lake District (Northeimer Seenplatte) with its European bird reserve. Shortly thereafter the path reaches Einbeck with its very well preserved medieval centre with richly decorated timber-framed houses. Further north it enters the densely wooded region of Hildesheim. From here there are frequent views of the Leine valley. From the collective municipality of Freden (Leine) paths lead to the Radweg der Kunst ("Cycle path of Art") and to Hildesheim. Between Kreiensen and Freden (Leine) the path passes the pumped storage station of Erzhausen and there is a wonderful view of the Selter and its crags. Other sights en route include the timber-framed towns of Alfeld and Gronau between the Seven Hills (Sieben Bergen). In the Fagus Factory in Alfeld, built by Walter Gropius in the Bauhaus style, there are changing exhibitions.

Somewhat further north is the castle of Marienburg, built in the middle of the 19th century in the neogothic style. The route then continues on into the North German Plain through the water meadows of the Leine to Hanover.

=== North German Plain and Lüneburg Heath ===
The path runs past the Steinhuder Meer Nature Park and through the river landscape of the Aller-Leine valley with its meadows, woods and bogs. In Bothmer and Ahlden, there are castles by the side of the path. In the Lüneburg Heath, the fields, meadows and small woods are exchanged for the heathlands typical of this region. The path passes Walsrode and well-known heath resorts like Schneverdingen or Wilsede. The finish of the route is the Hanseatic city of Hamburg.

== Transport links ==
A railway line accompanies the cycle path, running more or less parallel to it, for almost the entire route, so that access to the path is possible in many places. The route is also easily accessible by car everywhere.

At Einbeck, it crosses the EV2 The Capitals Route.

== State of the path ==
The surface of the path changes frequently between asphalt in various conditions, concrete slabs, sections cobbled with various materials and gravel, as well as unmetalled, partly sandy sections in fields and forests. The path is unsuitable for racing bikes in most sections, and south of the city of Hanover, there are unmetalled sections that can only be negotiated at low speed even when dry, unless mountain bikes are used. When these sections are wet, they are virtually impassable.

== Gallery ==
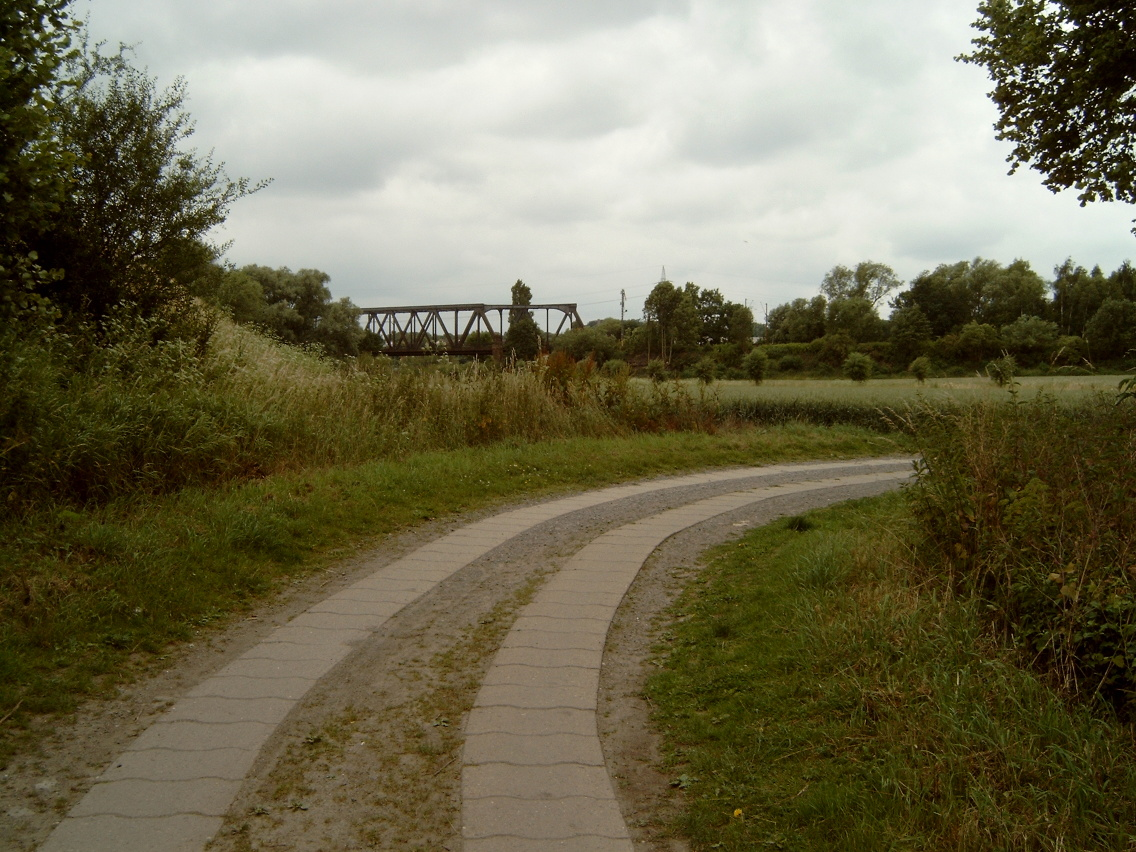
Between Hanover and Letter; a path with concrete slabs

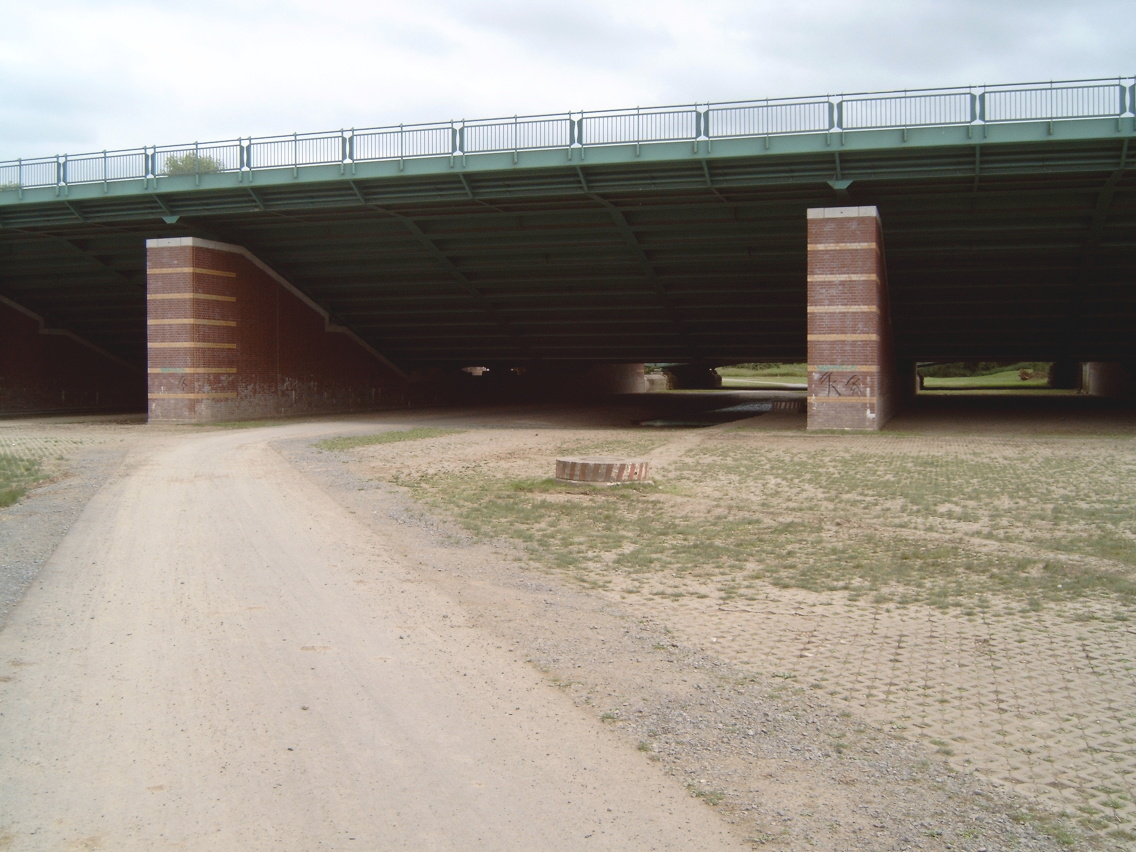
A crossing under the Mittelland Canal, near Garbsen

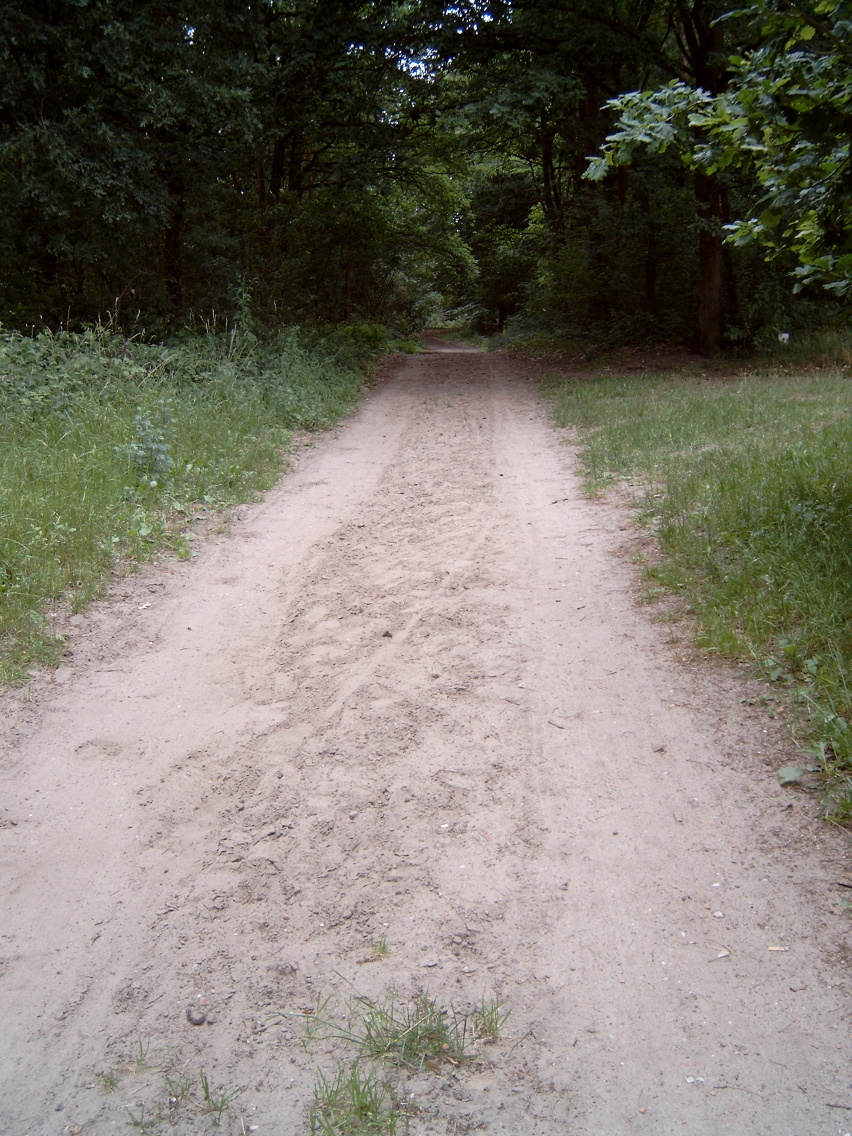
Between Schloß Ricklingen and Bordenau; unmetalled, sandy section
