= Schlörwagen =

Prototype aerodynamic automobile

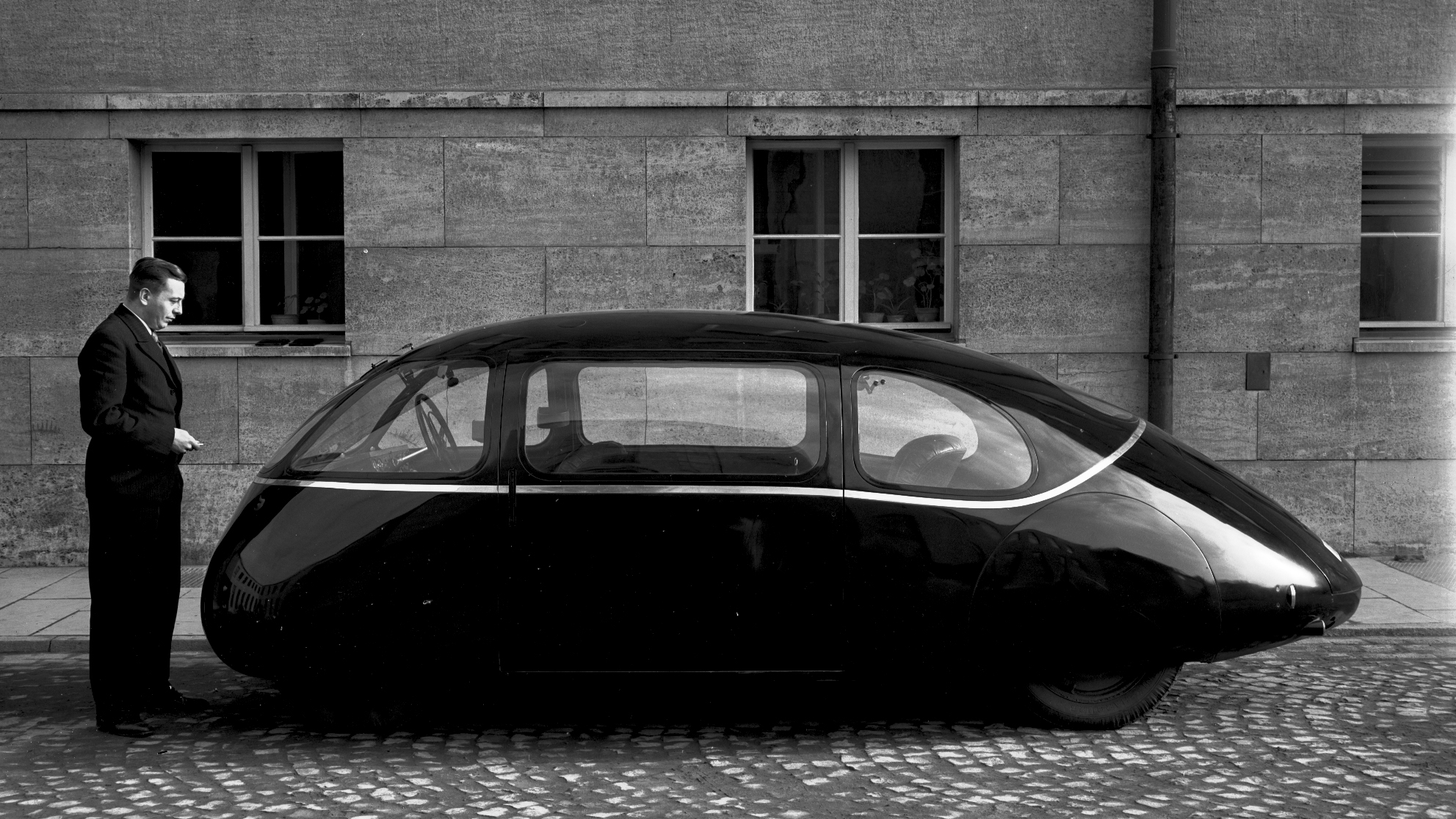
Schlörwagen in 1939

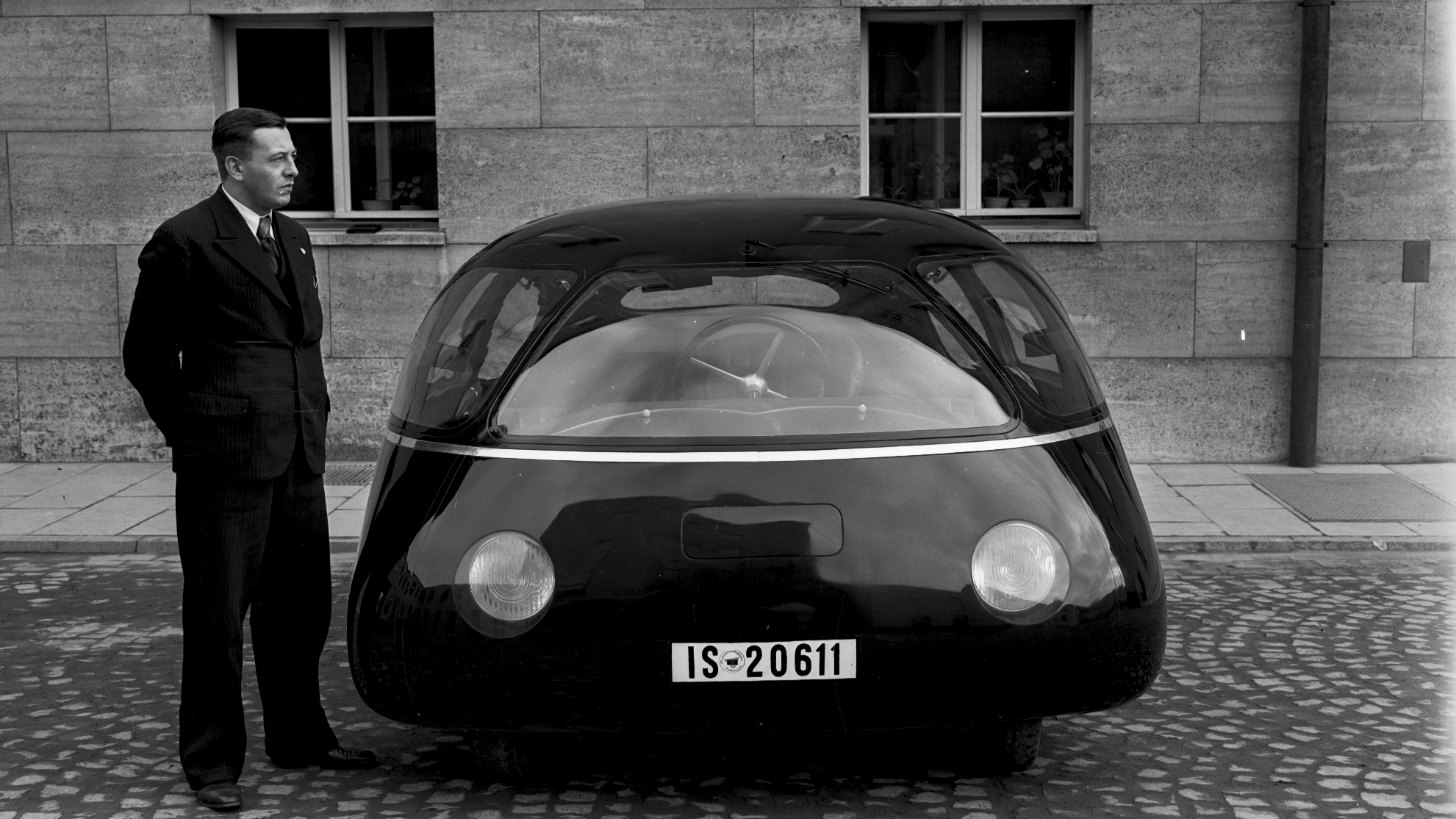
Schlörwagen from the front

The Schlörwagen (nicknamed "Göttingen Egg" or "Pillbug") was a prototype aerodynamic rear-engine passenger vehicle developed by Karl Schlör (1911–1997) and presented to the public at the 1939 Berlin Auto Show. It never went into production, and the sole prototype has not survived.

== Design history ==
Schlör, an engineer for KraussMaffei of Munich, proposed an ultra-low drag coefficient body as early as 1936. Under Schlör's supervision at the AVA (an aerodynamic testing institute in Göttingen) a model was built. Subsequent wind tunnel tests yielded an extraordinarily low drag coefficient of 0.113. For a functioning model, a Mercedes-Benz 170H chassis, one of their few rear-engine designs, was used. The aluminum body was built by the Ludewig Brothers of Essen. Subsequent tests of the motorized model showed a slightly higher but still impressive drag coefficient of 0.186.

The Schlörwagen was built on a modified chassis of the Mercedes 170H. The wheelbase was 2.60 meters, the vehicle was 4.33 meters long and 1.48 meters high. The width of 2.10 meters was needed to run the wheels inside the body. The bodywork, made by an Essen-based company, was teardrop-shaped, had flush-fitting curved windows and a closed floor. However, despite the aluminum construction, it was about 250 kg heavier than the Mercedes 170H (which weighed in at 2,480 lbs). The aerodynamic shape and far back center of gravity (because of the rear engine) affected the driving safety of the Schlörwagens and made them very vulnerable to crosswinds.

In a test drive with a production Mercedes 170H as a comparison, the Schlörwagen tested about 135 km/h top speed — 20 km/h faster than the Mercedes; it consumed 8 liters of fuel per 100 kilometers — 20 and 40 percent less fuel than the reference vehicle. According to Karl Schlör, the vehicle could reach a speed of 146 km/h.

A year later it was unveiled to the public at the 1939 Berlin Motor Show. Despite generating much publicity, it was perceived by the public as ugly. The project was shelved with the onset of World War II and mass production was never realized.

== Later history ==
In 1942, the prototype was fitted with a captured Soviet 130 hp (97 kW) radial aircraft engine and a propeller, and driven around a test track.

The prototype appears to have been stored until August 1948 on the site of the German Aerospace Center (DLR) in Göttingen. Schlör's attempts to obtain the heavily damaged body from the British military administration failed, and its fate is unknown.

In 2007 the German Aerospace Center (DLR), re-tested a small original model in a wind tunnel: It showed no stalls or braking turbulence. A 1:5 scale model based on the original drawings kept in the DLR archives is on display in the PS Speicher transport museum in Einbeck.

As of 2020, the Hanover-based non-profit Mobile Welten e.V. was working on building two replicas of the cars using original Mercedes engines and Maybach transmissions.

== Gallery ==
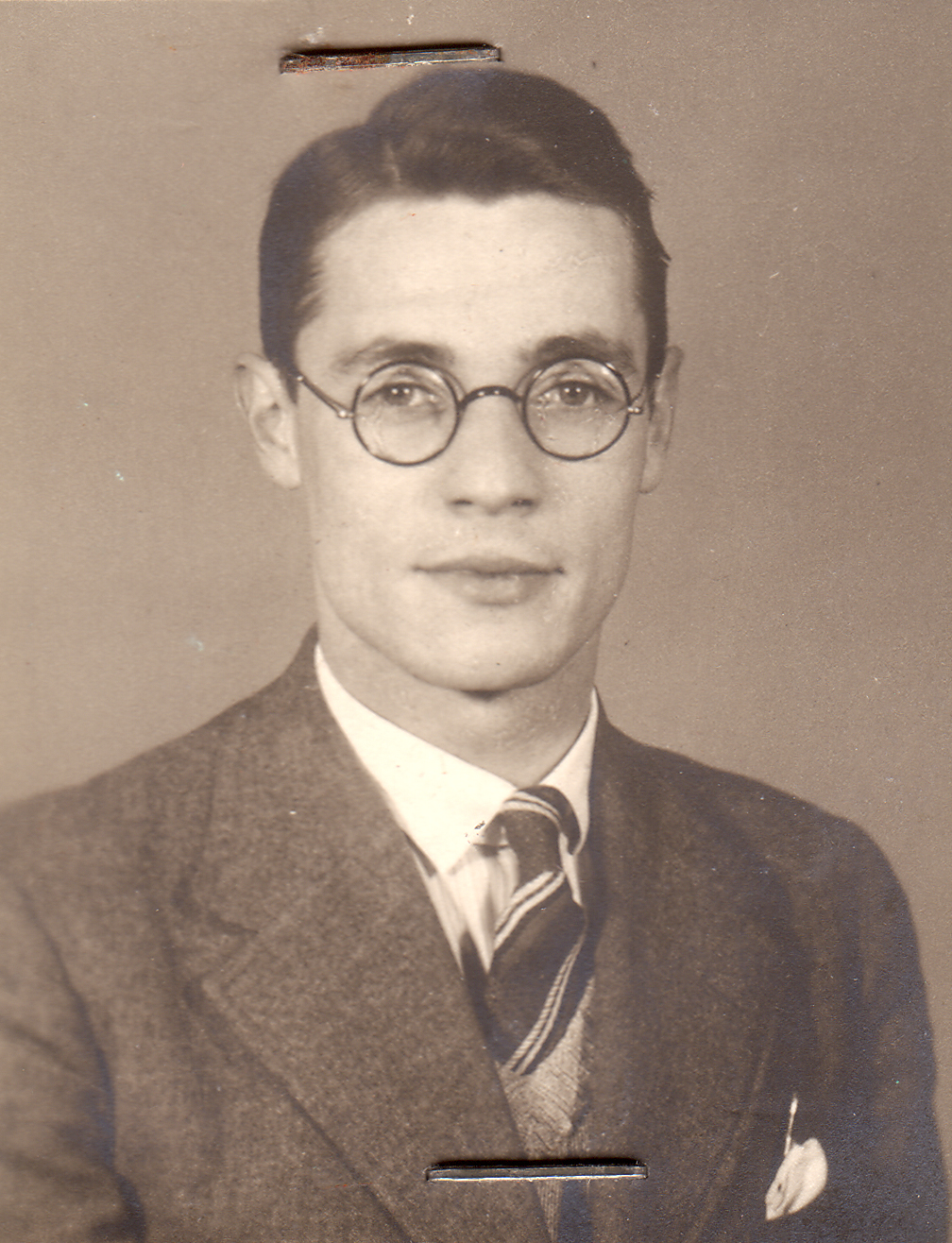
Karl Schlör (1939)

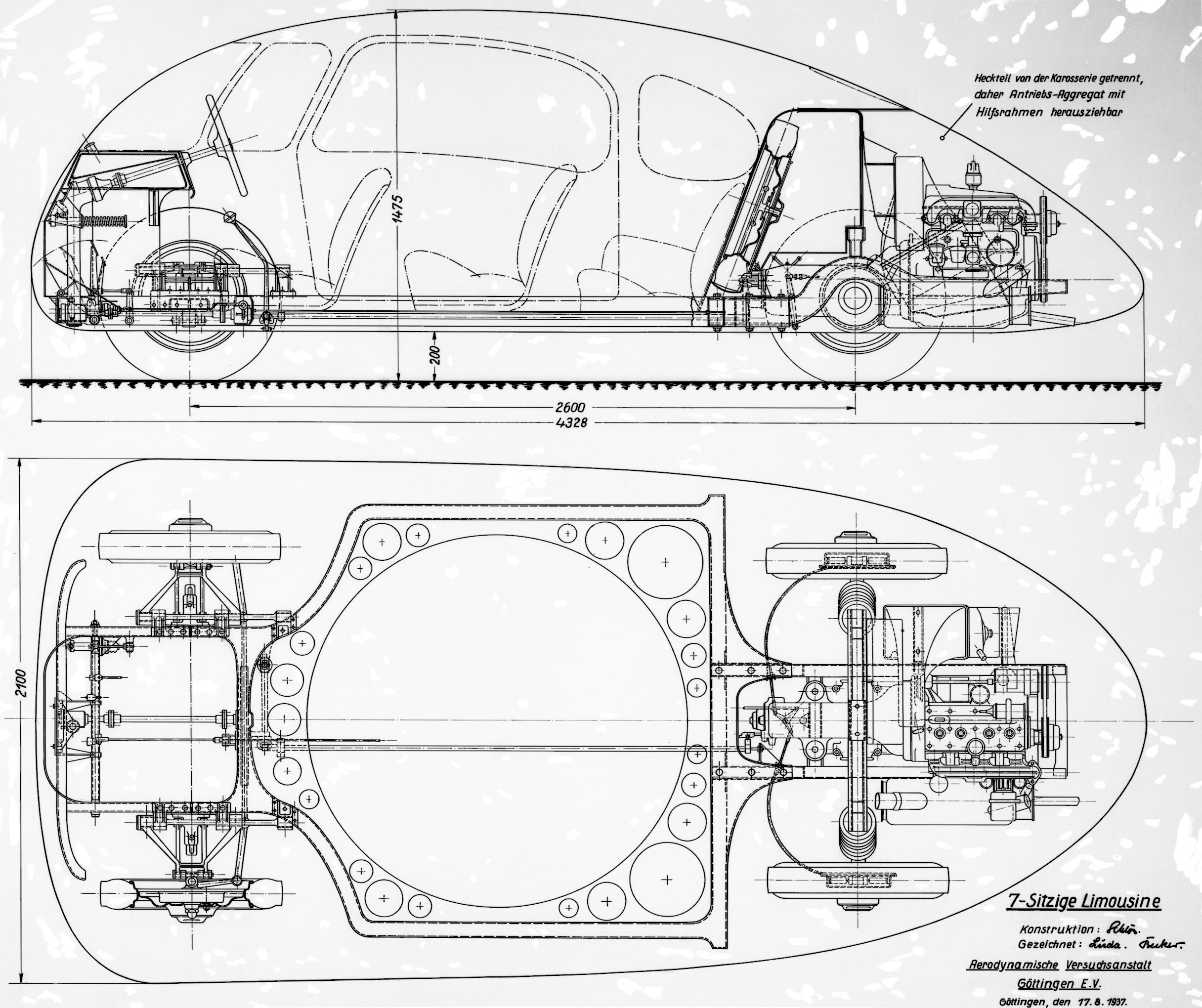
Construction drawings

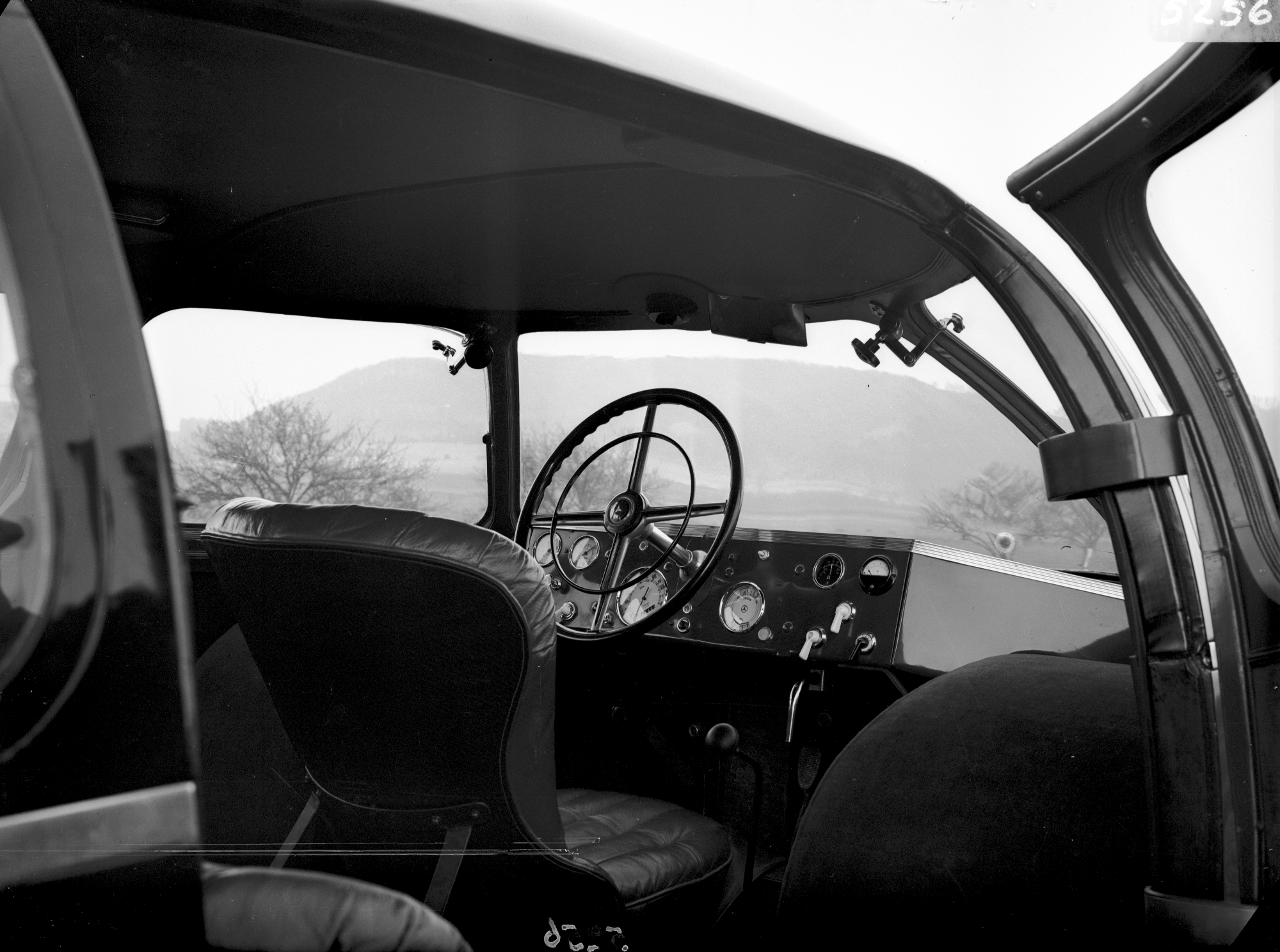
Interior View

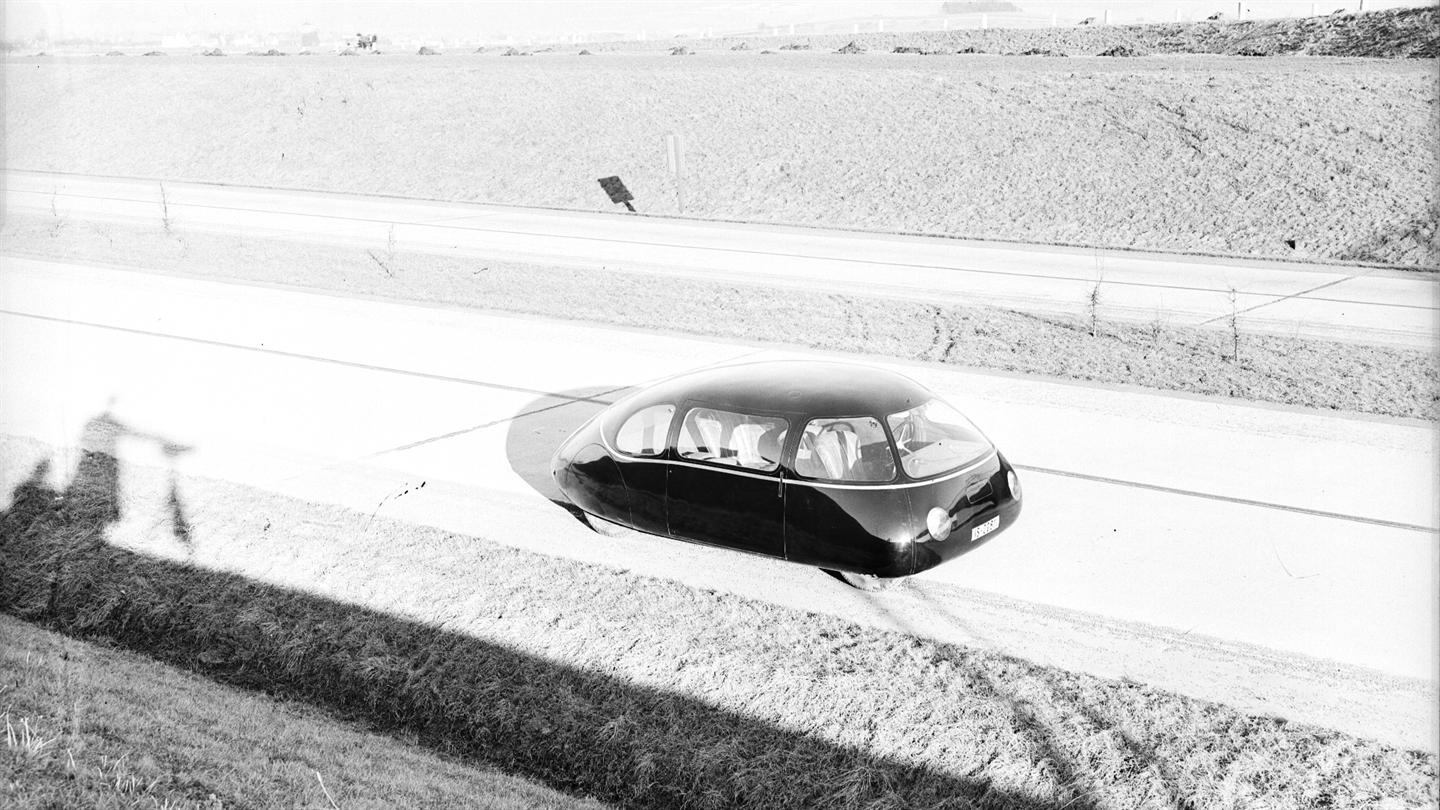
Test drive on the Autobahn

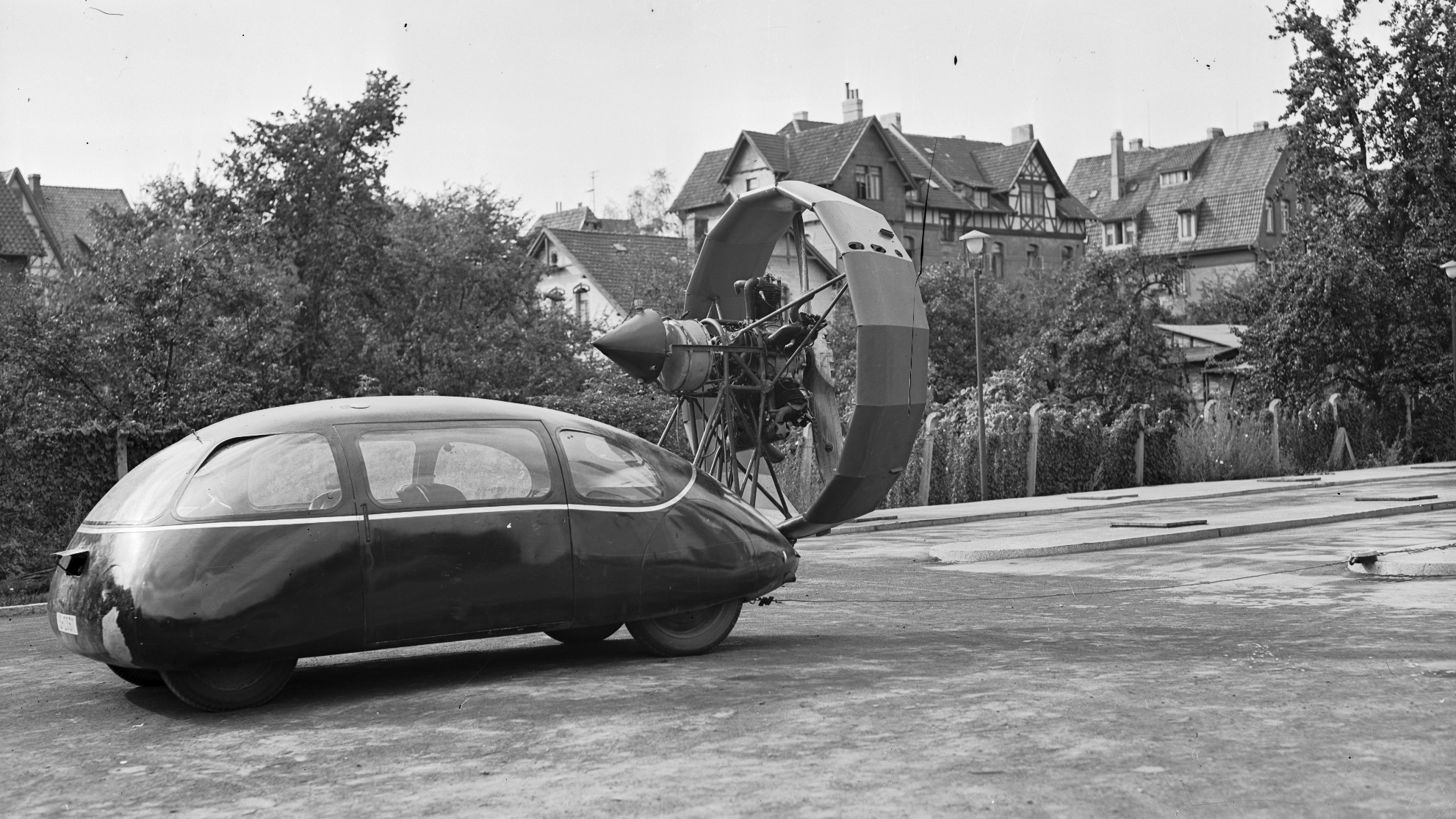
With a Russian aircraft engine (1942)

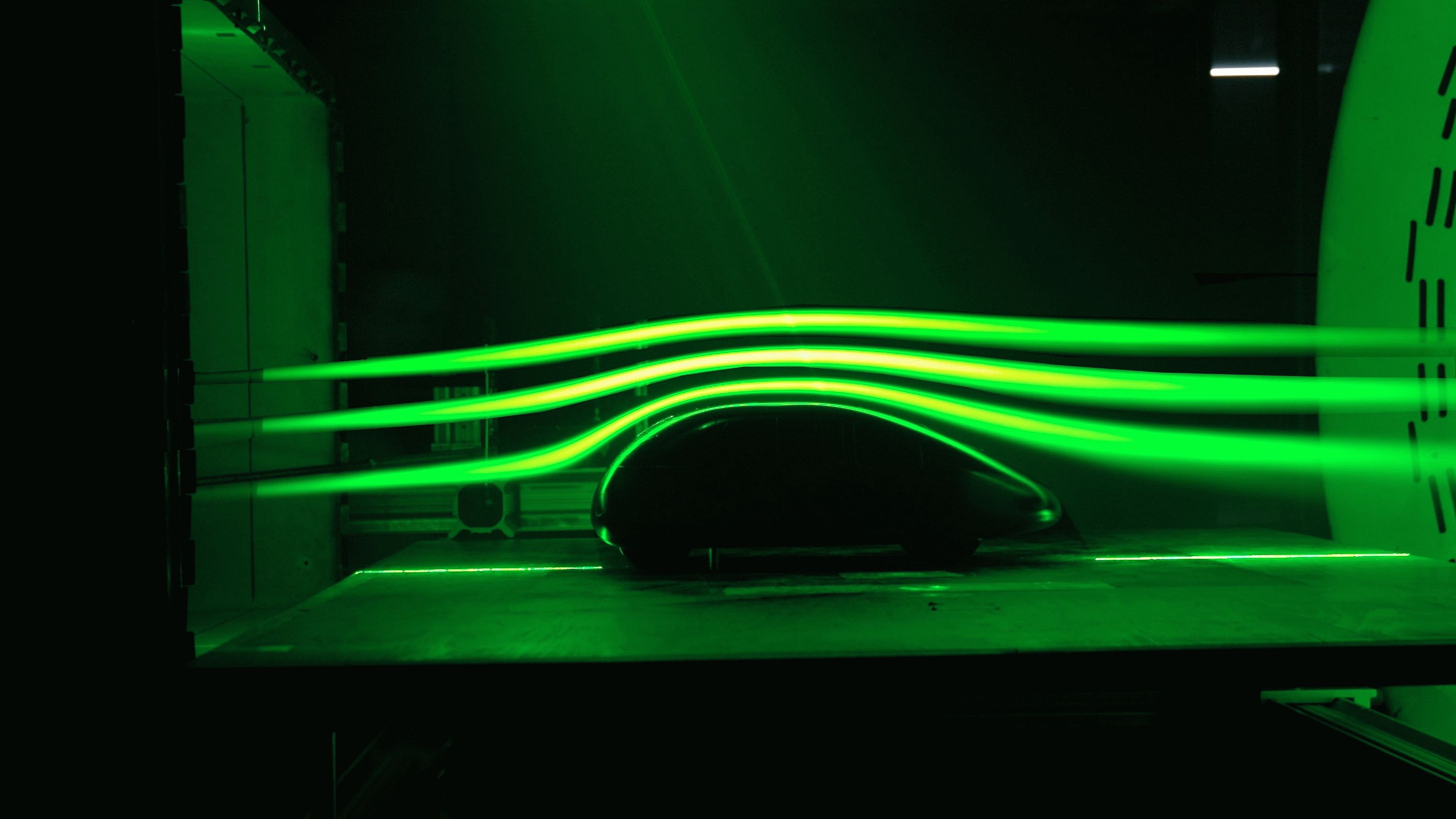
Model in the DLR wind tunnel

== See also ==
- Streamliner: Automobiles for overview of early aerodynamic automobiles

Other early teardrop-shaped cars, chronologically

- Rumpler Tropfenwagen (1921), first aerodynamic "teardrop" car to be designed and serially produced (about 100 units built)
- Persu car (1922–1923), designed by Romanian engineer Aurel Persu, improved on the Tropfenwagen by placing the wheels inside the car body
- Stout Scarab (1932–1935, 1946), US
- Dymaxion car (1933), US
