= Penno =

Penno is a surname or, more rarely, a given name that may refer to:

== Surname ==
- Enno Penno (1930–2016), Estonian politician
- Gino Penno (1920–1998), Italian tenor
- Rudolf Penno (1896–1951), Estonian politician
- Sebastian Penno (born 1990), German politician
- William A. Penno, Jr. (1843–1929), American banjo player, composer, music teacher
