= Christian Jung (disambiguation) =

Christian Jung may refer to

- Christian Jung (geneticist) (born 1956), geneticist
- Christian Jung (born 1977), politician
