= Edgar Lissel =

German visual artist

Edgar Lissel (born 1965 in Northeim, Germany) is a visual artist.

He studied photography at the University of Applied Sciences Darmstadt.

Since 1993 he has been working as a visual artist. In his interdisciplinary projects he searches for traces of the tension between natural science, archeology, arthistory and artistic work while examining pictorial processes and the ephemeral state of images.

In his early works Edgar Lissel has been using the camera obscura and converted a transporter into a mobile pinhole camera. With his works about the italian fascism and the German national socialism he has been invited to the Venice Architecture Biennale in 1996. His works "Räume“ are based around living quarters and museum displays which he converted into walk-in pinhole cameras. Simple optical principles combine the upside down scene outside the pinhole camera with the silhouettes of the objects inside the camera.

Since 1999, Edgar Lissel has been working with bacteria, using their phototropic properties to produce his images. The bacteria move out of the shadowed areas into the light. At the Domus Aurea (Rome) he collaborated with microbiologists from the University of Rome and archeologists of the Soprintendenza Roma in examining the decay of frescoes caused by contamination from a culture of bacteria. In his artistic realisation he used the same bacteria, which are destroying the “original” site, as active participants in a constructive image process. Since 2004 Edgar Lissel is using his skin flora for his artistic image production. By physical contact with a nutrient agar his body leaves traces in the form of bacterial colonies, which mirror the contours of his body.

== Publications ==
2008 “Vom Werden und Vergehen der Bilder - Edgar Lissel“, Publisher Schlebrügge Vienna, ISBN 978-3-85160-139-8
