= William Sheridan Allen =

American historian (1932–2013)

- Born: October 5, 1932; Evanston, Illinois, U.S.
- Died: March 14, 2013 (aged 80)
- Education: University of Michigan; University of Connecticut; University of Minnesota; Free University of Berlin; University of Göttingen
- Occupations: Historian, professor
- Employer: State University of New York at Buffalo
- Known for: Studies on Nazi Germany
- Notable work: The Nazi Seizure of Power; The Infancy of Nazism

William Sheridan Allen (October 5, 1932 – March 14, 2013) was an American historian.

== Biography ==
Allen was born in Evanston, Illinois, and studied history at the universities of Michigan, Connecticut, and Minnesota, and in Germany at the Free University of Berlin and the University of Göttingen. The Nazi Seizure of Power (1965) was his first book. He also wrote The Infancy of Nazism and worked on studies of the effectiveness of Nazi propaganda and of the Social Democratic underground in the Third Reich. He retired in 2001 as professor of history at the State University of New York at Buffalo.

Allen wrote two books on Adolf Hitler debunking the assertion that he came to power through violence. Rather, Allen claims, Hitler's Nazi movement "seized power" in an act akin to democratic tactics.

His most famous book, The Nazi Seizure of Power: The Experience of a Single German Town 1930–1935, was written to explain how one city (Northeim, Germany) fell into the Nazi trap. Fed by Nazi propaganda, many people of Northeim, especially in the middle classes, in the midst of the Great Depression saw the Nazis as a way to get their country back to greatness that Hitler and the Nazis promised they would do. The book was widely reviewed and extremely influential.
