= Northeim Lake District =

Series of lakes near Northeim, Lower Saxony, Germany

Northeim Lake District is a series of lakes near Northeim, Lower Saxony.

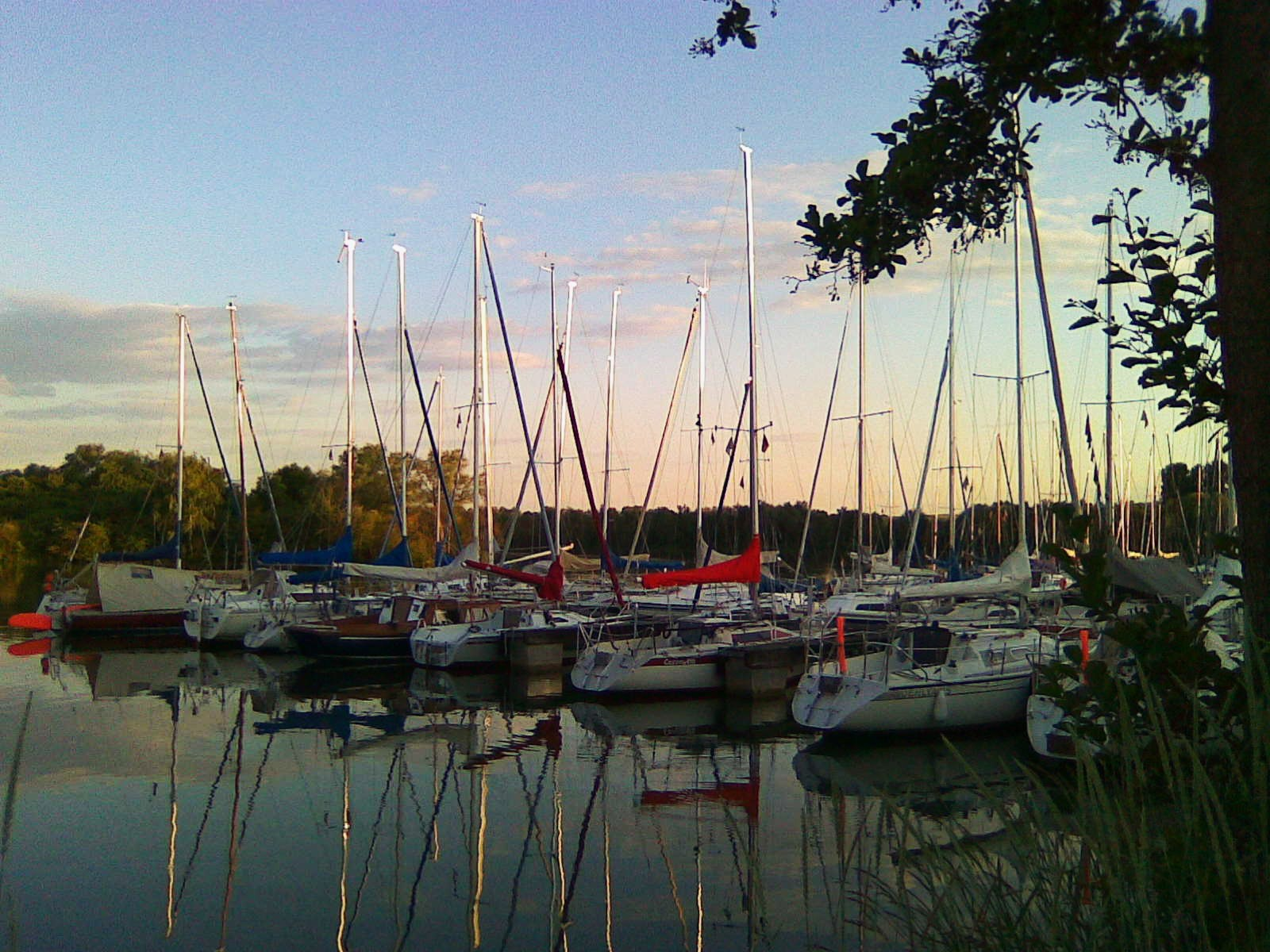
sailboats here

It has its origin in gravel extraction by open-pit mining. Digging for gravel began in 1852 in order to build the Royal Hanoverian State Railways. After World War II mining was intensified. Gravel that is found there is composed of greywacke, radiolarite and sand.

It is located where the Rhume river flows into the Leine river. Highway 3 crosses the Federal Motorway 7 there as well. The site is also crossed by the Leine-Heide Cycle Path.

It is now a recreation area. Persons can use the lakes for swimming, diving, windsurfing or sailing.

The area is also a conservation area in order to protect the birds that breed there like the great crested grebe, water rail, yellow wagtail or the Eurasian reed warbler.
