= Garte Valley Railway =

The Garte Valley Railway (German: Gartetalbahn) or Göttingen Narrow Gauge Railway (Göttinger Kleinbahn AG), was a narrow-gauge rail line that served to connect the area east of the city to Göttingen, Lower Saxony, Germany, from 1897 through 1959.

The company was founded on 16 November 1896. Already in the next year, a 750 mm narrow-gauge line running along the Garte stream was laid in the direction of Rittmarshausen.

Originally going from Göttingen to Rittmarshausen, it was extended in 1907 to reach Duderstadt. The section to Duderstadt was not very popular and was temporarily discontinued in 1922. It was soon reinstated but permanently discontinued in 1931. With the rise of private vehicles and an adequate bus service, the remaining service was discontinued in the 1950s: in 1957 regular passenger service on the line ceased, and in 1959 the line closed with the last of its freight service. The tracks were dismantled.

Today a part of the railway terrace is used in the Lower Saxony bicycle-path systems, being a section of the Weser-Harz-Heide Cycle Route (Lower Saxony long-distance route RFW 5).

== Route ==
0.0 Göttingen Staatsbahnhof until 1922
0.4 Göttingen Gartetalbahnhof from 1922
1.1 Göttinger Brauhaus
2.0 Lindenkrug
4.0 Landwehrschenke
5.7 Garteschenke
9.3 Diemarden
10.7 Klein Lengden
11.9 Steinsmühle
12.8 Eichenkrug
13.9 Benniehausen
15.0 Waterloo
16.1 Gartebrücke
16.9 Wöllmarshausen
18.1 Rittmarshausen
18.7 Gartebrücke
19.2 Kerstlingerode
20.6 Beienrode
22.6 Weißenborn
26.5 Nathebrücke
29.6 Nesselröden
33.3 Westerode
35.6 Duderstadt

== Reference material ==
- Karl Burmester: Göttinger Kleinbahn A.G. – Chronik der Gartetalbahn, 1897-1957: 60 Jahre Kleinbahngeschichte. Verlag Göttinger Tageblatt, Göttingen 1987, ISBN 3-924781-14-1
- DVD Gartetalbahn, ed. by Institut f. wissenschaftlichen Film (IWF) gGmbH, Z12900
- Gerd Wolff: Deutsche Klein-und Privatbahnen. Band 11: Niedersachsen 3 - Südlich des Mittellandkanals. EK-Verlag, Freiburg 2009, ISBN 978-3-88255-670-4.
