= Christian Jung (geneticist) =

German plant geneticist

- Born: 17 September 1956 (age 70); Northeim, Lower Saxony, Germany
- Education: University of Göttingen (Ph.D. 1984)
- Known for: Cloning a resistance gene against nematodes in beets
- Awards: Leibniz Prize of the German Research Foundation
- Scientific career
- Fields: Plant genetics, molecular biology
- Workplaces: Leibniz University Hannover; LMU Munich; Plant Breeding Institute, Kiel University
- Thesis: Intrinsic performance and interactions of rye and wheat genomes in triticale (1984)
- Doctoral advisor: Gerhard Röbbelen

Christian Jung (born 17 September 1956, Northeim, Lower Saxony), is a plant geneticist and molecular biologist in the Plant Breeding Institute of Kiel University.

== Career ==
After internships in agricultural companies in Germany and Canada Jung studied at the University of Göttingen with Hans Günter Schlegel, and in 1981 obtained a diploma on the basis of the "Detection of nitrogen fixation in two strains of the hydrogen bacterium Alcaligenes latus". He studied at the Institute for Plant Production and Plant Breeding of the same university, where he received his doctorate in 1984 with a thesis on the "Intrinsic performance and interactions of rye and wheat genomes in triticale" supervised by Gerhard Röbbelen.

Later Jung had positions at the Leibniz University Hannover and LMU Munich before becoming Professor and Director at the Plant Breeding Institute of Kiel University.

== Research ==
Jung's principal interest is in molecular breeding and the development of pest-resistant crops. In that respect he is known for cloning a resistance gene against nematodes in beets. Other notable work includes cloning the genome of quinoa, and the importance of controlling the time of flowering time in plant breeding.

== Awards ==
In 2005 Jung received the Leibniz Prize awarded by the German Research Foundation.
