= Sebastian Penno =

German politician (born 1990)

Member of the Landtag of Lower Saxony
- Incumbent
- Assumed office 8 November 2022

Personal details
- Born: 12 July 1990 (age 35) Northeim
- Party: Social Democratic Party (since 2009)

Sebastian Penno (born 12 July 1990 in Northeim) is a German politician serving as a member of the Landtag of Lower Saxony since 2022. He has been a member of the Social Democratic Party since 2009.
