= Northeim =

- Town
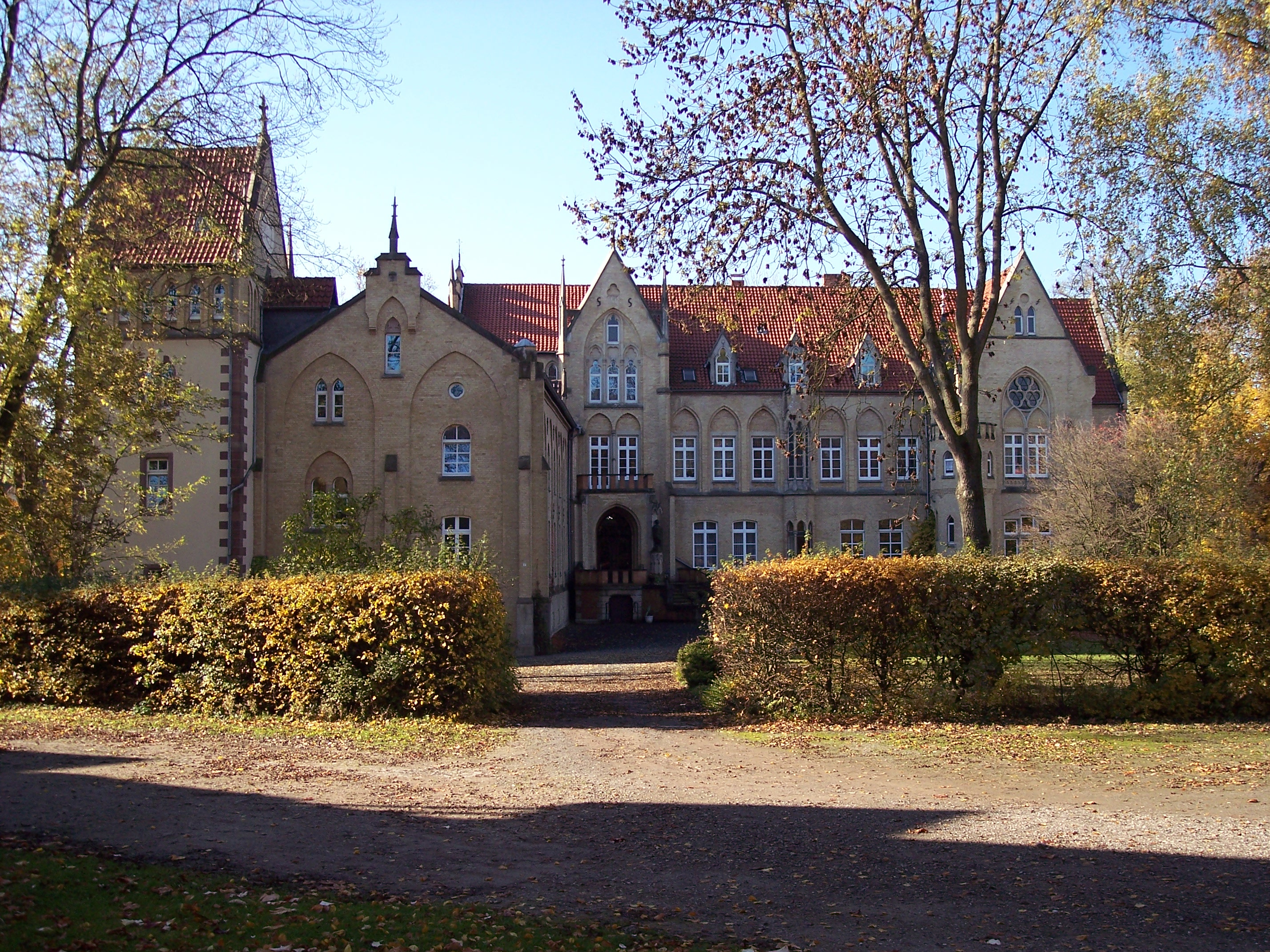
- Castle of Imbshausen

- Flag Coat of arms

- Location of Northeim within Northeim district
- Interactive map of Northeim
- Location within Germany Location within Lower Saxony
- Coordinates: 51°42′24″N 10°00′04″E
- Country: Germany
- State: Lower Saxony
- District: Northeim
- Subdivisions: 16 Ortsteile

Government
  - Mayor (2018–2023): Simon Hartmann (SPD)

Area
  - Total: 145.85 km^{2} (56.31 sq mi)
- Elevation: 120 m (390 ft)

Population (2025-12-31)
  - Total: 27,174
  - Density: 186.31/km^{2} (482.55/sq mi)
- Time zone: UTC+01:00 (CET)
  - Summer (DST): UTC+02:00 (CEST)
- Postal codes: 37154
- Dialling codes: 05551
- Vehicle registration: NOM, EIN, GAN
- Website: www.northeim.de

Northeim (German pronunciation: [ˈnɔʁthaɪm]; Low German: Nuurten) is a town in Lower Saxony, Germany, seat of the district of Northeim, with a population of 27,522 as of 31 December 2023. It lies on the German Half-Timbered House Road.

== History ==
Northeim is first mentioned in 800 in a document recording a property transfer by a Frankish nobleman to the Abbey of Fulda. In the 10th century the surrounding region became a county, administered by the Counts of Northeim. The first of them, Siegfried is mentioned in 982. From 1061 to 1070 Count Otto II held the stem duchy of Bavaria as an Imperial fief, but lost it again because of his involvement in the Saxon plot against King Henry IV.

The monastery of St. Blasius was founded around 1100. In 1252 Northeim obtained town rights, and from 1384 to 1554 it was a member of the Hanseatic League. When protestantism was introduced in 1532 all the churches were allocated to the protestants. The town became part of the Kingdom of Hanover.

A part of Northeim was devastated by a fire in 1832 when the representative town hall dating from the Middle Ages and more than 40 houses burnt down. Further damage was caused by a fire in 1892 which destroyed several historic buildings in the Market Place.

After the railway from Hanover to Göttingen had been inaugurated in 1854 Northeim gained in importance and became a railway junction. The South Harz Railway was opened in 1868 and the Solling Railway in 1878. During the Second World War Northeim was hit by bombs in September 1944, February 1945 and in March 1945. The railway station, five factories and 18 houses were completely destroyed and 80 houses were damaged. The historic centre did not suffer severe bomb damage.

Northeim, under the pseudonym of Thalburg, is the subject of William Sheridan Allen's book The Nazi Seizure of Power (ISBN 0-531-05633-3), a comprehensive study of the success of Nazism at town level. The book describes how the Nazis took over all social groups in the town and Nazified them, but failed to instill positive enthusiasm for the Nazi state. Instead, the population was "atomized" and deprived of the means to express group grievances. The book has been criticized for neglecting the role of the churches, which remained largely autonomous. However, even its critics say that the book is crucial to our understanding of Nazi Germany and has played a key role in shaping scholarship. Imbshausen, the site of a post-World War II British sector Displaced Persons camp, was incorporated into the town in 1974.

On 15 November 1992 an express train crashed into the wreckage of a derailed freight train near Northeim. Eleven people died and 52 were injured.

== Culture ==
The town has a town museum and archive. There is an outdoor stage outside the town. The town is also home to a puppet theatre, Theater der Nacht, which since 2001 has been housed in a redesigned fire station.

Some of the old town wall still stands, including a watchtower.

== Transport ==
Hanoverian Southern Railway connects Northeim with cities like Göttingen and Hanover. Solling Railway connects Northeim with cities at the southern part of Solling-Vogler Nature Park.

Northeim also provides a small grass airfield (ICAO locator code: EDVN) due east of the town.

== Twin towns – sister cities ==
Northeim is twinned with:

- Cherbourg-en-Cotentin, France
- Gallneukirchen, Austria
- Prudnik, Poland

== Inhabitants ==
(at 31 December each year)

- 1998: 31,902
- 1999: 31,804 (−98)
- 2000: 31,691 (−113)
- 2001: 31,432 (−259)
- 2002: 31,183 (−249)
- 2003: 31,033 (−150)
- 2004: 30,973 (−60)
- 2005: 30,744 (−229)
- 2006: 30,617 (−129)
- 2007: 30,294 (−323)
- 2008: 29,980 (−314)
- 2009: 29,657 (−323)
- 2010: 29,431 (−226)
- 2011: 29,327 (−104)
- 2012: 29,018 (−309)
- 2013: 28,843 (-175)
- 2014: 28,833 (−10)
- 2015: 28,796 (−37)
- 2016: 28,966 (+170)
- 2017: 29,040 (+74)
- 2018: 29,440 (+400)
- 2019: 29,098 (−342)
- 2020: 29,397 (+299)
- 2021: 29,956 (+559)
- 2022: 29,440 (−516)
- 2023: 29,967 (+527)

== Sights ==
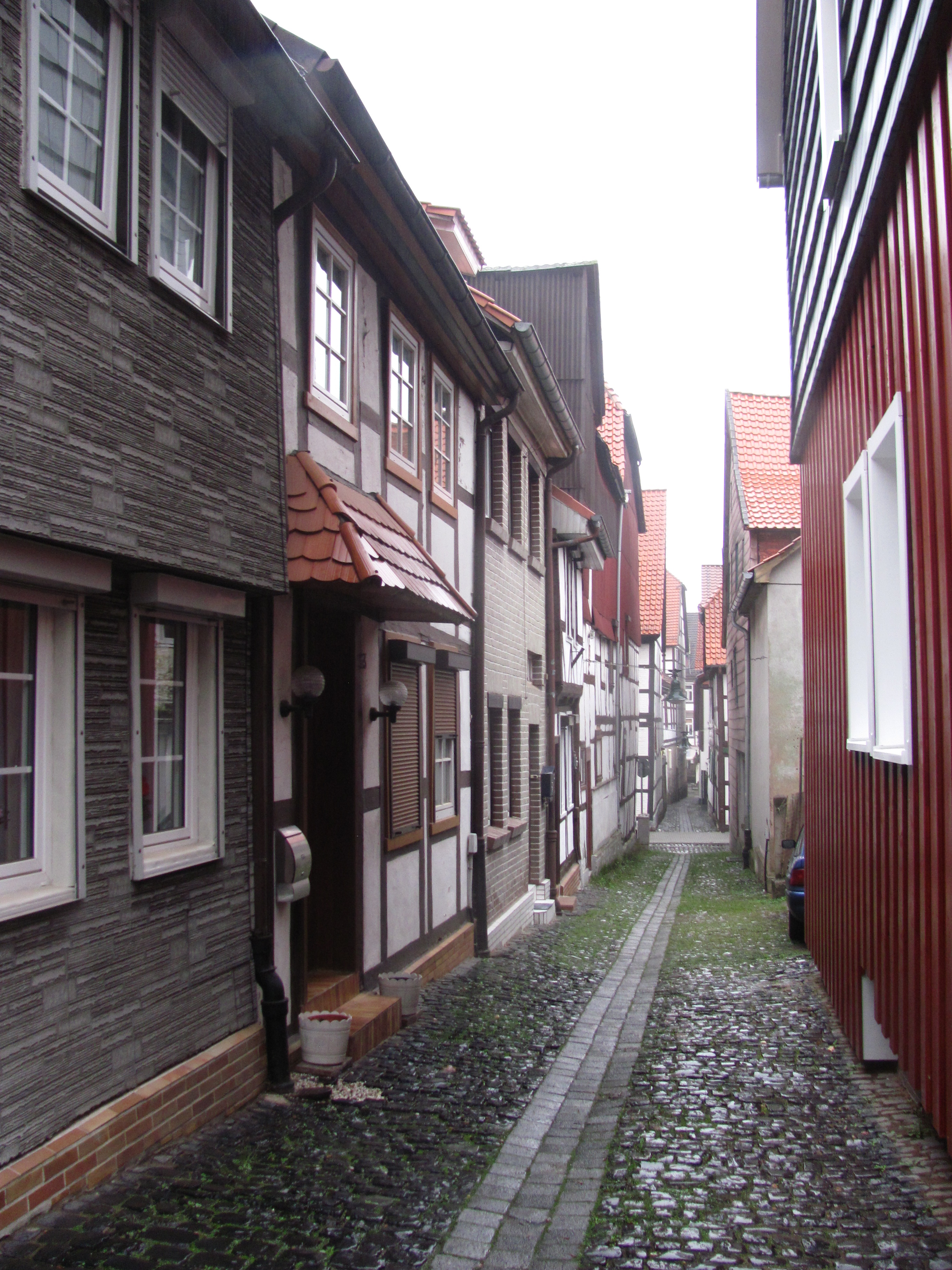
Lane Wassergasse

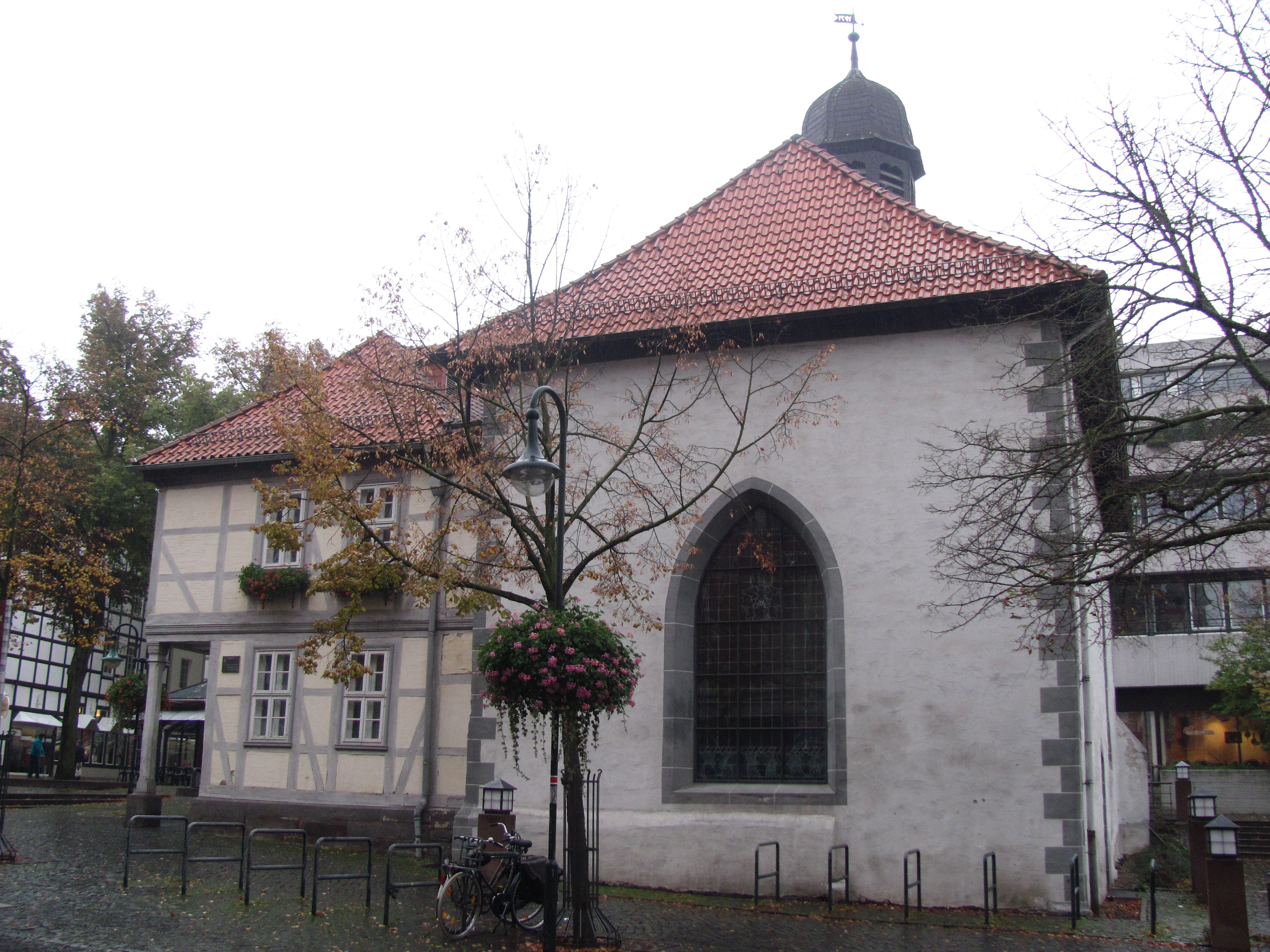
Saint Fabian's and Sebastian's Chapel

There are many well-preserved half-timbered houses in the old centre of Northeim, e.g. in Wassergasse, one of the most picturesque lanes, and in Kuhgasse, the narrowest lane of Northeim. The oldest half-timbered houses were built of oak wood in the 15th century. In many façades wood carvings are worth a look.

A part of the historic centre is still surrounded by the medieval wall which was built in 1252–1305.

The oldest church of Northeim is Saint Fabian's and Sebastian's Chapel which was built in a typical gothic style in the middle of the 14th century and renovated in 1985/86. Saint Sixti's Church was built from 1464 to 1517. It houses a gothic altar dating from 1420 and another altar created in the 16th century. After the church had been allocated to the Protestants in 1539 there were no Catholics living in Northeim for several decades. The first catholic church to be built after the reformation was Saint Mary's Church outside the historic town centre which was founded at the end of the 19th century.

Saint Spiritus Hospital is a large half-timbered house with wood carvings built around 1500.

Saint Blasii is a former monastery which was founded in the 11th century and dissolved in 1592 after the reformation.

In the village of Imbshausen which was incorporated into the city in 1974 a castle built 1862–64 in a large park is worth a visit.

Theater der Nacht is located in an old firestation, rebuilt and designed by the artists Ruth und Heiko Brochhausen. It opened in May 1999. The theatre's speciality is Puppetry.

=== Churches ===
- St. Sixti Church
- Apostel Church
- Corvinus Church

== Notable people ==
- Otto of Nordheim (ca 1020–1083), Duke of Bavaria from 1061 until 1070.
- Heinrich Kreipe (1895–1976), general, died there
- Georg Diederichs (1900–1983), local politician (SPD)
- Loriot (1923-2011), humorist, went to school there
- Hartmut Heinrich (born 1952), marine geologist and climatologist
- Christian Jung (born 1956), geneticist and plant breeder
- Edgar Lissel (born 1965), visual artist
- Sebastian Penno (born 1990), politician
- Anna Naklab (born 1993), singer-songwriter, grew up there
- Eros Dacaj (born 1996), German footballer, played over 200 games

== See also ==
- Hannover–Braunschweig–Göttingen–Wolfsburg Metropolitan Region
- Northeim Lake District
