= Bovenden =

- Municipality
- Flag Coat of arms

- Location of Bovenden within Göttingen district
- Interactive map of Bovenden
- Location within Germany Location within Lower Saxony
- Coordinates: 51°35′23″N 09°55′20″E
- Country: Germany
- State: Lower Saxony
- District: Göttingen

Government
  - Mayor (2021–26): Thomas Brandes (SPD)

Area
  - Total: 63.59 km^{2} (24.55 sq mi)
- Elevation: 139 m (456 ft)

Population (2025-12-31)
  - Total: 14,036
  - Density: 220.7/km^{2} (571.7/sq mi)
- Time zone: UTC+01:00 (CET)
  - Summer (DST): UTC+02:00 (CEST)
- Postal codes: 37120
- Dialling codes: 0551, 05593, 05594
- Vehicle registration: GÖ
- Website: www.bovenden.de

Bovenden is a municipality in the district of Göttingen, in Lower Saxony, Germany. In 2020 the population in the eight villages belonging to the municipality was 13,891.

== Geography ==
Bovenden is situated on the river Leine, approx. 6 km north of Göttingen and on the north western border of Göttingen Forest. The main village of the municipality, Bovenden, is between Osterberg and the Keuperrücken of the Lieth, a small river which flows into the river Leine. On a hill east of the village Eddigehausen stand the remains of the Plesse Castle.

=== Parts of the municipality ===
The municipality is divided into the following villages:

- Billingshausen
- Bovenden, main village
- Eddigehausen
- Emmenhausen
- Harste
- Lenglern
- Reyershausen
- Spanbeck

Furthermore, there are the former villages that have ceased to be since the Middle Ages:

- Rodershausen oder Rodershusen (2 km to the northwest of Bovenden)
- Aspe oder Aspa (1 km to the northeast of Spanbeck)
- Botleveshusen (0,2 km to the west of Mariaspring)
- Backenhusen (1,2 km to the east of Reyershausen)
- Sturmbeke oder Stumbeke (0,9 km to the west of Reyershausen)

=== Population development ===
The population of the main village Bovenden has increased ever since the second half of the 20th century:

Historical population

| Year | Pop. | ±% p.a. |
|---|---|---|
| 1871 | 1,572 | — |
| 1925 | 1,537 | −0.04% |
| 1939 | 1,531 | −0.03% |

| Year | Pop. | ±% p.a. |
|---|---|---|
| 1950 | 2,460 | +4.41% |
| 1955 | 2,409 | −0.42% |
| 1961 | 2,872 | +2.97% |

== History ==
The village of Bovenden is first mentioned in a deed by Otto I from February 2, 949, in which the future emperor certifies a barter with Hersfeld Abbey. In this first designation the toponym was Bobbenzunon. In the following years the village was also referred to as Bobbantun (1141), Bobentun (1170), and Bobentum (1191). Since the 13th century the name Boventen was commonly used and since the end of the 16th century today's designation Bovenden was introduced. The origin of the town name is contended. One derivation is the combination of the personal name Bovo or Bob(b)o with the suffix -tun. The suffix -tun is Low German and means "fence, confinement, or fenced area". Consequently, the name might refer to a settlement founded or governed by Bobo. Another interpretation is that the stem of the name is derived from bioðan (=„above“, cf. Low German boven), referring to the contrained settlement above the flood plain of the Leine.

In the 12th century the aristocratic family of the "Herren von Bovenden" makes its first appearance. They are mentioned in a document in 1170 for the first time. In this document, which contains information about bestowals in the area around Bovenden to the Abbey Helmershausen, Bobo of Bovenden is mentioned as one of the witnesses. Starting in 1211 the "Herren von Bovenden" appear as the patrons of the local chapel. In the following decades the family of Bovenden succeeded in enlarging their property. Bovenden remained nevertheless the main village, in which seven farms, eleven and a half hooves of land, two meadows and the castle were included. The family of Bovenden appeared as Burgmanns at the Hardenberg, served as Mainzians, and were often witnesses at the Hardenbergers, a noble family of Lower Saxony. Despite the vicinity to the Electorate of Mainz the family of Bovenden also took feudal tenures from the House of Welf. In the 14th century the family of Bovenden sided mainly with the family of Braunschweig, for example in 1364 Knight Günther of Bovenden promised Duke Otto to help him with everything except the archbishop of Mainz. And in case Duke Otto managed to free him of the alliance with the Electorate of Mainz Knight Günther would serve only Duke Otto. The influence of the family of Boventen on the history of the area was significant for two centuries until the end of the 14th century. Only the line of Lenglern continued the name after 1500. The possessions of the Herren of Bovenden, which are referred to as nobiles and miles in documents, were transferred to the noble men of Plesse. Today, the key in Bovenden's emblem indicates the relationship to the Electorate of Mainz as Burgmans at the Hardenberg.

The Herren of Bovenden are the most significant landowners in Bovenden since the 14th century. They gave their whole estate to Landgrave Louis I of Hesse in 1447 and received the estate again as a feudal tenure. Through this measure the Herren of Bovenden were able to obtain a higher degree of home rule in front of the Duchy of Brunswick-Lüneburg. After the line of Plesse ended in 1571 the rule was transferred to the Landgraviate of Hesse-Kassel and the area turned into a Hesse enclave. Since the 16th century Bovenden received more rights as a consequence of being the most important location of the reign of the Plesse family. These rights included that Bovenden was designated a "Flecken" since 1587 which showed that the area has a market right and since 1605 Bovenden was also bestowed with brewing right.

After Plesse Castle was abandoned in 1660, Bovenden turned into the administrative center. Starting in 1777, a new representative baroque building replaced two former Meierhofs of the Steina Abbey. The representative and administrative tasks were executed in this Hesse castle until 1815. The building further served as the hunting lodge of the Landgraviate of Hesse-Rotenburg. The location of the enclave provided various professions with special development possibilities.

Due to the founding of the University of Göttingen in 1737 Bovenden experienced an economic boost in the second half of the 18th century. Many students came to the Hesse-Kassel enclave to watch traveling theater groups, eat in the tavern "Zum letzten Heller" as well as to drive to the tavern in Rauschenwasser. It was also popular to purchase wine, spirits, coffee, and sugar there as these goods were burdened with luxury taxes in Göttingen. As these activities were regarded as a waste of time and incurring debts by the students, the authorities of Göttingen University came up with the term "Dangers of Bovenden."

In the context of a local government transformation in Germany in 1973 the eight villages of the area were merged to become the municipality of Bovenden.

== Twin towns ==
Bovenden is twinned with Dursley, England.
