= Harste =

Village in Lower Saxony, Germany

Coordinates: 51°36′N 9°52′E

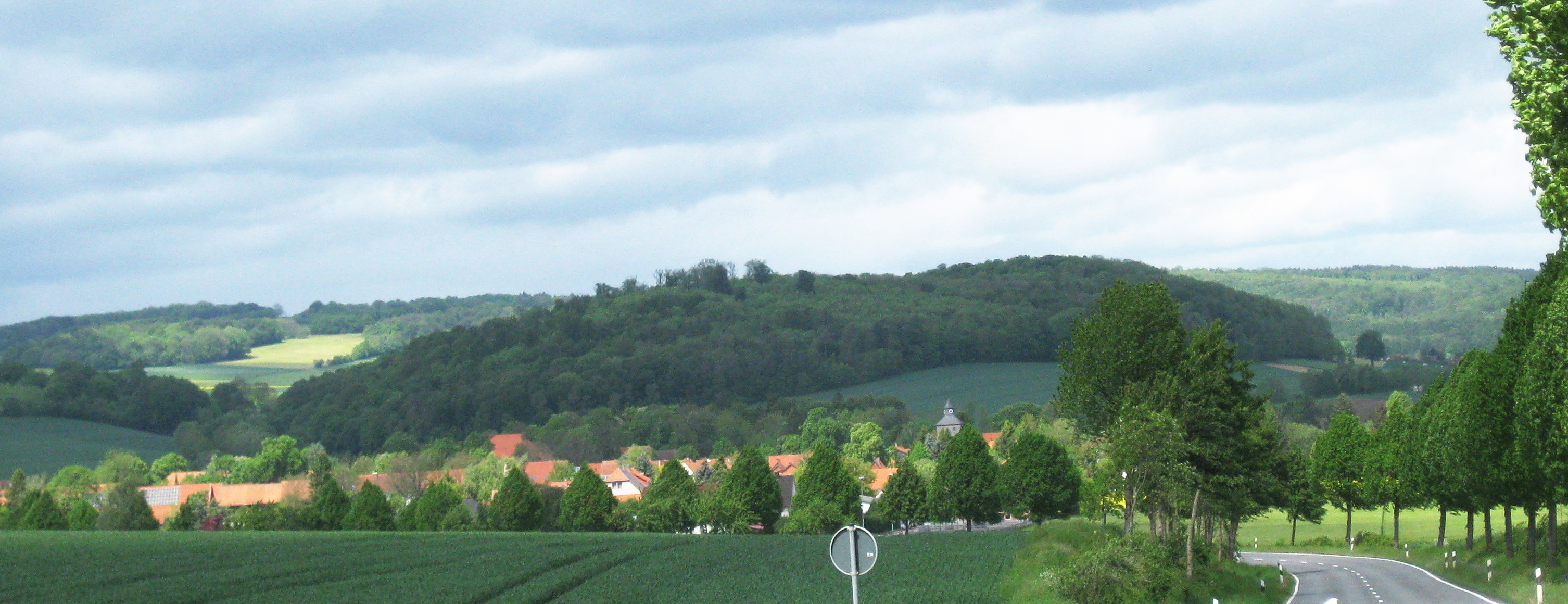
Harste

Harste is a village to the northwest of Göttingen, Lower Saxony, Germany, belonging to the Gemeinde Bovenden.

While the date of its founding is unknown, archaeological investigations conducted in the 1980s revealed Grubenhaueser from the 7th century and what appears to be continuous occupation since then at least until around the end of the 15th century. The first archival record of the community is from 952. Presently existing houses date back well over a century.

In 953 Otto I, Holy Roman Emperor transferred the community, which he had gotten from Graf Billung, to the Moritz Monastery in Magdeburg. The year 1294 is the first year in which there is a reference to the Harste castle. Within a generation, it burned and was restored. Nevertheless, it gradually fell into dis-repair over the next two and a half centuries until it was re-built in 1770. On 29 August 1727, the castle burned but the castle and grounds were re-built the following year, the castle (Domaene)appearing for the first time in substantially the way it now looks.

== Name ==
The etymology of Harste is in dispute. Archival records of the village give its name as follows over the years: Heristi (952), Heriste (1144), Herste (1249), Heirste (1349), and Harsta (1590). The current version dates from the middle of the 17th century.

== Economy ==
There is a branch of Fa. Tedox KG (formerly Teppich Domäne Harste GmbH & Co. KG) in the former castle.

Harste was once the headquarters of the helicopter service Firma Hubschrauber Sonder Dienst. Although the HQ has moved to Göttingen, the Harste heliport still serves as the base for the firm's active ambulance helicopter.

== Clubs and associations ==
Kultur- und Heimatverein Harste e.V.

Sportverein Rot-Weiß Harste e.V.

Schützenverein Harste von 1927 e.V.

Freiwillige Feuerwehr Harste

Fanfarenzug Harste
