= PS Speicher =

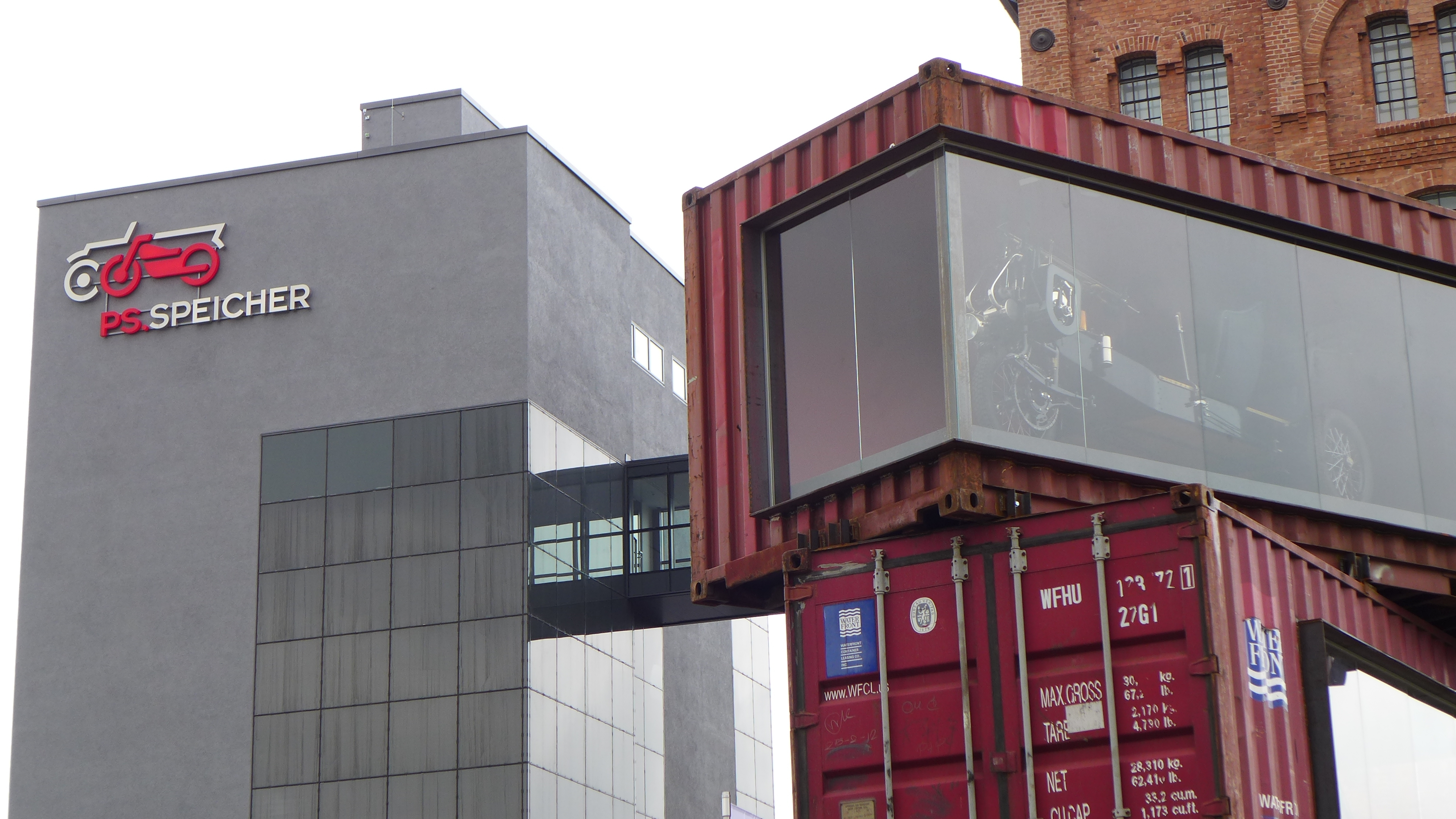
- Established: 2014; 12 years ago
- Location: Tiedexer Tor 3, Einbeck
- Coordinates: 51.8195°N 9.8601°E
- Type: Transport
- Public transit access: Bundesstraße 3
- Website: ps-speicher.de

The PS Speicher is a transport museum in Einbeck, Germany. It features the world's largest collection of German motorcycles, as well as vintage cars, and shows the development of individual transport.

== History ==
In 1898, a granary was built in Einbeck from brick stone material. In the second half of the 20th century, it was taken out of usage as more modern granaries were constructed in the region. For several years, it was then used for different purposes. In 2012, a major restoration was initiated. It is now a cultural heritage building. PS Speicher opened by mid 2014 after being declared open by Stephan Weil in an opening ceremony.

== Exhibitions ==
PS Speicher comprises six floors, each of which covers a certain time period. While the highest floor depicts the beginning of individual motorisation with the first motorcycles and cars, the lowest floor addresses current research and possible developments of individual transport technology. All stages in between these two are covered in the remaining four floors. Vehicles are presented in full size dioramas within scenes of historic events. In addition, an exhibition of historic supermini cars refers to Wirtschaftswunder time.

The exhibition as well as audio tours are bilingual, German and English.

The theme park has an overall size of 25,000 square metres (270,000 sq ft). It includes the 4,000 square metres (43,000 sq ft) exhibition building with children's playground, ticket pavilion, a six degrees of freedom driving simulator with Porsche chassis that is unique in Germany, a restaurant and the museum shop which sells a wide range of reproduction posters, models, gifts and souvenirs.

== Collections ==
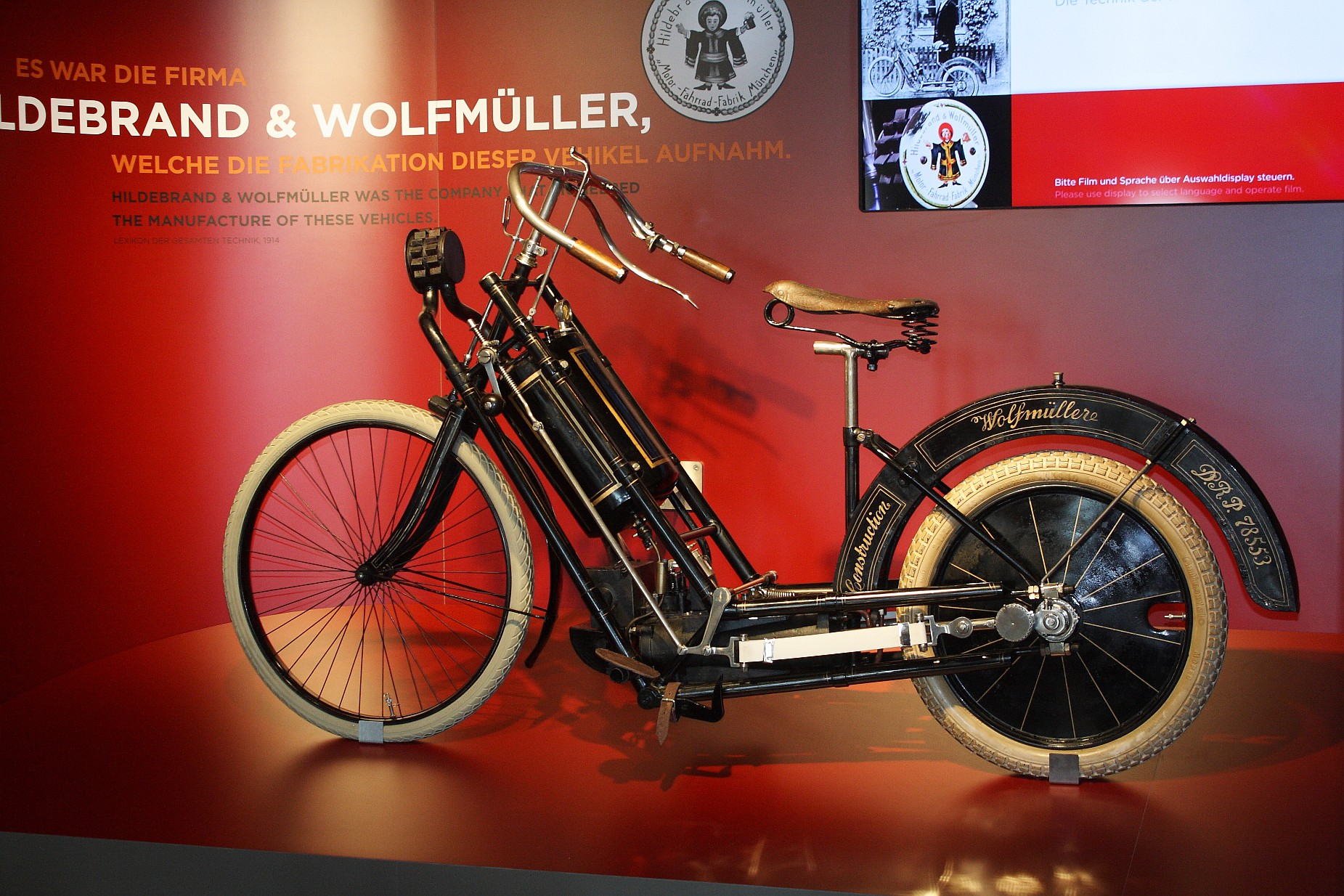
Hildebrand & Wolfmüller

It displays a range of more than 300 German classic motorcycles and antique cars. Exhibits range from one of the earliest motorcycles to the fastest motorcycles that were built to stock. Not all of the museums vehicles are on display at a time.

Notable exhibits include a Hildebrand & Wolfmüller motorcycle, first generation scooters and IFA F9 or Panhard cars.
