= Philadelphia PGA Championship =

The Philadelphia PGA Championship is the annual section championship of the Philadelphia Section of the PGA of America. It has been played since 1922 on courses throughout the Philadelphia area, including courses in Delaware and New Jersey. The most notable winner of this event is 1959 Masters Tournament champion Art Wall Jr., who won this event five times. In addition, several PGA Tour pros have had victories in this tournament, including Henry Williams, Jr. (three times), Ed Dougherty (three times), Clarence Hackney (two times), Al Besselink (two times), Gene Kunes (two times), Marty Furgol, and noted golf course designer George Fazio.

== Winners ==
Year	Champion	Venue	Location
2026	Braden Shattuck	Whitemarsh Valley Country Club; Sandy Run Country Club	Lafayette Hill, Pennsylvania; Oreland, Pennsylvania
2025	Braden Shattuck	Concord Country Club	West Chester, Pennsylvania
2024	Brett Walker	Chester Valley Golf Club; Rolling Green Golf Club	Malvern, Pennsylvania; Springfield, Pennsylvania
2023	Zac Oakley	Elmhurst Country Club; Country Club of Scranton	Clarks Summit, Pennsylvania
2022	Brian Bergstol	DuPont Country Club	Wilmington, Delaware
2021	Brett Walker	Aronimink Golf Club	Newtown Square, Pennsylvania
2020	Alex Knoll	Bent Creek Country Club	Lititz, Pennsylvania
2019	Alex Knoll	Union League Golf Club	Philadelphia, Pennsylvania
2018	Billy Stewart	Concord Country Club	Concordville, Pennsylvania
2017	Terry Hertzog	Laurel Creek Country Club	Mount Laurel, New Jersey
2016	Jordan Gibbs	Philadelphia Cricket Club	Flourtown, Pennsylvania
2015	Dave McNabb	Concord Country Club	Concordville, Pennsylvania
2014	George Forster	Llanerch Country Club	Havertown, Pennsylvania
2013	Dave Quinn	White Manor Country Club	Malvern, Pennsylvania
2012	Stu Ingraham	White Manor Country Club	Malvern, Pennsylvania
2011	Rich Steinmetz	White Manor Country Club	Malvern, Pennsylvania
2010	Rich Steinmetz	Concord Country Club	Concordville, Pennsylvania
2009	John Pillar	Concord Country Club	Concordville, Pennsylvania
2008	Stu Ingraham	Llanerch Country Club	Havertown, Pennsylvania
2007	Rich Steinmetz	Concord Country Club	Concordville, Pennsylvania
2006	David Quinn	Hartefeld National Golf Club	Avondale, Pennsylvania
2005	Brian Kelly	Burlington Country Club	Mount Holly, New Jersey
2004	Terry Hertzog	Philadelphia Cricket Club	Flourtown, Pennsylvania
2003	Terry Hatch	Philadelphia Cricket Club	Flourtown, Pennsylvania
2002	Dave Roberts	Spring Ford Country Club	Royersford, Pennsylvania
2001	Terry Hertzog	Spring Ford Country Clu	Royersford, Pennsylvania
2000	Brian Kelly	Burlington Country Club	Mount Holly, New Jersey
1999	George Foster	Heidelberg Country Club	Bernville, Pennsylvania
1998	Jason Lamp	Heidelberg Country Club	Bernville, Pennsylvania
1997	Gene Fieger	Heidelberg Country Club	Bernville, Pennsylvania
1996	Gene Fieger	Little Mill Country Club	Marlton, New Jersey
1995	Brian Kelly	Little Mill Country Club	Marlton, New Jersey
1994	Frank Dobbs	Conestoga Country Club	Lancaster, Pennsylvania
1993	Jim Masserio	Conestoga Country Club	Lancaster, Pennsylvania
1992	Rick Osberg	Eagle Lodge Country Club	Lafayette Hill, Pennsylvania
1991	Miguel Biamon	Eagle Lodge Country Club	Lafayette Hill, Pennsylvania
1990	Jimmy Booros	Eagle Lodge Country Club	Lafayette Hill, Pennsylvania
1989	Rick Osberg	Eagle Lodge Country Club	Lafayette Hill, Pennsylvania
1988	Miguel Biamon	Eagle Lodge Country Club	Lafayette Hill, Pennsylvania
1987	Gary Hardin	Eagle Lodge Country Club	Lafayette Hill, Pennsylvania
1986	Ed Dougherty	Eagle Lodge Country Club	Lafayette Hill, Pennsylvania
1985	Rick Osberg	Eagle Lodge Country Club	Lafayette Hill, Pennsylvania
1984	Jim Masserio	North Hills Country Club	North Hills, Pennsylvania
1983	Dick Smith	Woodcrest Country Club	Cherry Hill, New Jersey
1982	Dick Smith	Huntingdon Valley Country Club	Huntingdon Valley, Pennsylvania
1981	Dick Smith	Cavaliers Country Club	Newark, Delaware
1980	Ed Dougherty	Waynesborough Country Club	Paoli, Pennsylvania
1979	Ted McKenzie	North Hills Country Club	North Hills, Pennsylvania
1978	Mike Nilon	Philadelphia Cricket Club	Flourtown, Pennsylvania
1977	Dick Smith	Saucon Valley Country Club	Bethlehem, Pennsylvania
1976	Andy Thompson	Toftrees Golf Resort	State College, Pennsylvania
1975	Ed Dougherty	Schuylkill Country Club	Orwigsburg, Pennsylvania
1974	Dick Smith	Philmont Country Club	Huntingdon Valley, Pennsylvania
1973	Joe Data	North Hills Country Club	North Hills, Pennsylvania
1972	Dick Hendrickson	Tamiment Resort & Country Club	Tamiment, Pennsylvania
1971	Art Wall Jr.	LeChateau Inn and Country Club	White Haven, Pennsylvania
1970	Marty Furgol	Radley Run Country Club	West Chester, Pennsylvania
1969	Al Besselink	Glen Oak Country Club	Clarks Summit, Pennsylvania
1968	Stan Dudas	Brookside Country Club	Macungie, Pennsylvania
1967	Bob Ross	Laurel Oak Country Club	Gibbsboro, New Jersey
1966	Bob Shave Jr.	Laurel Oak Country Club	Gibbsboro, New Jersey
1965	Art Wall Jr.	Llanerch Country Club	Havertown, Pennsylvania
1964	Bob Schoener, Jr.	North Hills Country Club	North Hills, Pennsylvania
1963	Art Wall Jr.	Atlantic City Country Club	Northfield, New Jersey
1962	Art Wall Jr.	Whitemarsh Valley Country Club	Lafayette Hill, Pennsylvania
1961	Bernie Haas	Buena Vista Country Club	Buena, New Jersey
1960	Al Besselink	Bala Golf Club	Philadelphia, Pennsylvania
1959	Stan Dudas	Philmont Country Club	Huntingdon Valley, Pennsylvania
1958	Henry Williams, Jr.	North Hills Country Club	North Hills, Pennsylvania
1957	Dick Sleichter	Atlantic City Country Club	Northfield, New Jersey
1956	Art Wall Jr.	Atlantic City Country Club	Northfield, New Jersey
1955	Stan Dudas	The Springhaven Club	Wallingford, Pennsylvania
1954	John Serafin	Shawnee Inn & Country Club	Shawnee on Delaware, Pennsylvania
1953	Henry Williams, Jr.	Shawnee Inn & Country Club	Shawnee on Delaware, Pennsylvania
1952	John Serafin	Shawnee Inn & Country Club	Shawnee on Delaware, Pennsylvania
1951	Rod Munday	Shawnee Inn & Country Club	Shawnee on Delaware, Pennsylvania
1950	Clarence Ehresman	Shawnee Inn & Country Club	Shawnee on Delaware, Pennsylvania
1949	Henry Williams, Jr.	Shawnee Inn & Country Club	Shawnee on Delaware, Pennsylvania
1948	Joseph "Bud" Lewis	Shawnee Inn & Country Club	Shawnee on Delaware, Pennsylvania
1947	Charles Schneider, Sr.	Wildwood Country Club	Cape May Court House, New Jersey
1946	Sam Davis	Cedarbrook Country Club	Wyncote, Pennsylvania
1945	Charles Sheppard	North Hills Country Club	North Hills, Pennsylvania
1944	Clarence Ehresman	Manufacturers Golf & Country Club	Oreland, Pennsylvania
1943	Joseph "Bud" Lewis	Llanerch Country Club	Havertown, Pennsylvania
1942	Gene Kunes	Llanerch Country Club	Havertown, Pennsylvania
1941	George Fazio	Llanerch Country Club	Havertown, Pennsylvania
1940	Matt Kowal	Llanerch Country Club	Havertown, Pennsylvania
1939	Charles Schneider, Sr.	Llanerch Country Club	Havertown, Pennsylvania
1938	Joe Zarhardt	Llanerch Country Club	Havertown, Pennsylvania
1937	Charles Schneider, Sr.	Llanerch Country Club	Havertown, Pennsylvania
1936	Ted Turner	Llanerch Country Club	Havertown, Pennsylvania
1935	Robert "Buzz" Campbell	Whitemarsh Valley Country Club	Lafayette Hill, Pennsylvania
1934	Gene Kunes	North Hills Country Club	North Hills, Pennsylvania
1933	Charles Schneider, Sr.	Huntingdon Valley Country Club	Huntingdon Valley, Pennsylvania
1932	George Smith	Concord Country Club	Concordville, Pennsylvania
1931	George Griffin, Sr.	Riverton Country Club	Riverton, New Jersey
1930	George Smith	Bala Golf Club	Philadelphia, Pennsylvania
1929	George Smith	Bala Golf Club	Philadelphia, Pennsylvania
1928	Clarence Hackney	Philmont Country Club	Huntingdon Valley, Pennsylvania
1927	Joe Coble	Concord Country Club	Concordville, Pennsylvania
1926	Jack Campbell	Ashbourne Country Club	Cheltenham, Pennsylvania
1925	Bob Barnett	Tredyffrin Country Club	Paoli, Pennsylvania
1924	Clarence Hackney	Linwood Country Club	Linwood, New Jersey
1923	Bob Barnett	Stenton Country Club	Philadelphia, Pennsylvania
1922	Charlie Hoffner	Tredyffrin Country Club	Paoli, Pennsylvania
