= Charles Campbell Worthington =

American industrialist

- Charles C. Worthington in 1896 at the Royal North Devon GC, Westward Ho!, Bideford, England
- Born: January 1854; Brooklyn, New York
- Died: October 1944 (aged 90)
- Occupations: Engineer, businessman
- Known for: Worthington mower
- Spouses: Julia Apgar Hedden (m. 1879) Maude Clement Rice (m. 1906)
- Parent(s): Henry Rossiter Worthington; Sara Newton

Charles Campbell Worthington, or C.C. Worthington, (January 1854 – October 1944) was an American industrialist whose efforts were in part responsible for the foundation of the Professional Golfers Association. He invented the first commercially successful gang lawnmower for fairway maintenance.

== Early life ==
Charles Campbell Worthington was born in Brooklyn, New York, in January 1854, son of Sara Newton and Henry Rossiter Worthington. His father had invented the first direct-acting steam pump in 1840.

He graduated from the School of Mines at Columbia University.

== Career ==
After graduating from Columbia, he entered the family business, eventually taking over the Worthington Company upon his father's death in 1880.

=== Worthington Pumping Engine Company ===
While head of the company, Worthington contributed many useful improvements to pumps, compressors, and other machines. In 1885 the Worthington Pumping Engine Company, representatives of Worthington pumps of the United States, obtained an order from the British Army to deliver ten high-pressure pumps to deliver water needed by the British Expeditionary army coming to the aid of General Gordon in Khartoum, Sudan. The British pump suppliers did not have the capacity to deliver the pumps fast enough. The British company James Simpson & Co. learned of the Worthington company because of this order, and on 13 December 1885 signed an agreement with the Worthington Pumping Engine Company under which they gained exclusive manufacturing rights for Worthington pumps in Britain.

In 1899, Worthington sold his interests in the Worthington Pump Co. to a consortium of six leading pump manufacturers. The combined company became the International Steam Pump Company. Worthington was president of the company. The International Pump Company was forced to dissolve due to findings under the Sherman Antitrust Act, and in 1903 Worthington retired.

=== Worthington Automobile Company ===
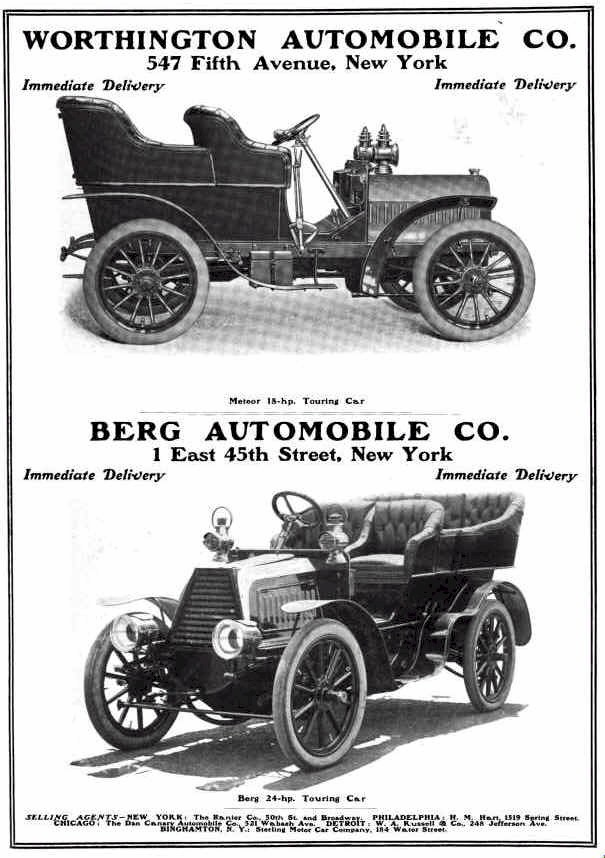
1904 advertisement in Horseless Age magazine

After retiring from pump manufacturing, Worthington designed and built six Worthington Meteor steam automobiles. He then became interested in gasoline engines and organized the Worthington Automobile Company. This company built several types of pleasure car. Worthington was financed by the Vanderbilt fortune. In 1904, he purchased the rights and property of the Berg Automobile Company. In 1905, Berg cars were built by Worthington, which was also building its first Meteor cars. By the end of 1905, the Berg-Worthington collaboration had failed.

=== Shawnee on Delaware ===
In the late 1890s, Worthington began to spend an increasing amount of time at his country home in Shawnee on Delaware, in Pennsylvania on the banks of the Delaware River, about 75 miles (121 km) to the west of New York. He built his first small golf course around 1898.

In 1903, he purchased 8,000 acres (3,200 ha) of land of both sides of the Delaware River. He built Buckwood Lodge, a small mansion, on the side of Kittatinny Ridge in Pennsylvania, between the river and Sunfish Pond, a small lake higher up the ridge covering 258 acres (104 ha). Worthington gave Sunfish Pond the name of Buckwood Lake, and used it as a water supply for his lodge. Worthington hunted deer in what is now the Worthington State Forest in Warren County, New Jersey.

In 1904, Worthington built Worthington Hall, later known as the Shawnee Playhouse, in Shawnee on Delaware. (Note: Worthington Hall was added to the National Register of Historic Places in 1978. The building was demolished after a fire caused by arson on June 24, 1985.)

=== Golf course ===
Worthington built the Buckwood Inn in Shawnee, an exclusive resort with an eighteen-hole golf course, designed by A. W. Tillinghast. This later became the Shawnee Country Club. The course was completed around 1910. In 1912, he invited professional golfers to compete on his course, and this led to the foundation of the Professional Golfers' Association of America.

After trying unsuccessfully to keep the fairways in shape by grazing sheep on them, Worthington designed the gang mower with three moving wheels. He launched the Shawnee Mower Factory to manufacture it. Later this became the Worthington Mower Company, based in nearby Stroudsburg, Pennsylvania. Worthington saw there was demand from farmers for a low-priced tractor that could economically handle light loads. He produced the Worthington Model T until 1930, and then the Worthington Model A based on components from the Ford Model A. The company made about 430 Model T tractors and just over 400 Model A tractors.

At first the inn was successful, but it had difficulty competing as travel became easier. With the Great Depression the inn's business suffered, and the building was not properly maintained. Worthington's family sold the inn in 1943 to Fred Waring, a famous choral master. The mower company was sold in 1945 to Jacobsen Manufacturing.

Worthington was a member of The Tin Whistles.

== Personal life ==
In 1879, Worthington married Julia Apgar Hedden. After her death, he married his second wife, Maude Clement Rice, in 1906. The couple had two daughters.

Worthington died in October 1944.
