= 1967 NCAA University Division golf championship =

1967 NCAA University Division Golf Championship
Tournament information
- Location: Shawnee on Delaware, Pennsylvania, U.S. 40.998889°N 75.125556°W
- Course: Shawnee Golf Course

Statistics
- Field: 39 teams

Champion
- Team: Houston (10th title); Individual: Hale Irwin, Colorado

Location map
- Location in the United States Location in Pennsylvania

The 1967 NCAA University Division Golf Championship was the 29th annual NCAA-sanctioned golf tournament to determine the individual and team national champions of men's collegiate golf in the United States.

The tournament was held at the Shawnee Golf Course in Shawnee on Delaware, Pennsylvania.

Three-time defending champions Houston won the team title, the Cougars' tenth NCAA team national title.

== Individual results ==
=== Individual champion ===
- Hale Irwin, Colorado

== Team results ==
Rank	Team	Score
1	Houston (DC)	585
2	Florida	588
3	LSU	591
4	Purdue	596
5	Wake Forest	597
6	Arizona State	598
6	Michigan State	598
6	Virginia Tech	598
T9	Fresno State	599
T9	New Mexico	599
T9	North Texas State	599
T9	San José State	599

- Note: Top 10 only
- DC = Defending champions
