= 1938 PGA Championship =

Coordinates: 41.005°N 75.115°W

Tournament information
- Dates: July 10–16, 1938
- Location: Smithfield Township, Pennsylvania, U.S.
- Course: Shawnee Country Club
- Organized by: PGA of America
- Tour: PGA Tour
- Format: Match play - 6 rounds

Statistics
- Par: 72
- Length: 6,656 yards (6,086 m)
- Field: 107 players, 64 to match play
- Cut: 151 (+7), playoff
- Prize fund: $10,000
- Winner's share: $1,100

Champion
- (United States) Paul Runyan
- def. Sam Snead, 8 and 7

Location in the United States
Location in Pennsylvania

The 1938 PGA Championship was the 21st PGA Championship, held July 10–16 at Shawnee Country Club in Smithfield Township, Pennsylvania.

Then a match play championship, Paul Runyan won his second PGA Championship, defeating the favored Sam Snead 8 and 7. Nicknamed "Little Poison," Runyan was one of the shorter hitters on tour, while Snead was one of the longest. Runyan was five holes up after the morning round, then needed just eleven holes to finish off Snead, the largest victory margin ever in the match play finals of the PGA Championship. Snead won only one of the 29 holes, the 24th, which Runyan bogeyed. Runyan's victory four years earlier in 1934 took 38 holes to decide.

Two-time defending champion Denny Shute lost in the third round to semifinalist Jimmy Hines.

The course, now The Shawnee Inn & Golf Resort, is on an island in the Delaware River, east of East Stroudsburg, Pennsylvania.

== Format ==
The match play format at the PGA Championship in 1938 called for 12 rounds (216 holes) in seven days:

- Sunday and Monday – 36-hole stroke play qualifier, 18 holes per day;
  - defending champion Denny Shute and top 63 professionals advanced to match play
- Tuesday – first two rounds, 18 holes each
- Wednesday – third round – 36 holes
- Thursday – quarterfinals – 36 holes
- Friday – semifinals – 36 holes
- Saturday – final – 36 holes

== Final results ==
Saturday, July 16, 1938

Place	Player	Money ($)
1	(United States) Paul Runyan	1,100
2	(United States) Sam Snead	600
T3	(United States) Jimmy Hines	350
T3	(United States) Henry Picard	350
T5	(United States) Jim Foulis	250
T5	(United States) Byron Nelson	250
T5	(United States) Gene Sarazen	250
T5	(United States) Horton Smith	250

== Final eight bracket ==
Quarter-finals; July 14
Paul Runyan	4&3
Horton Smith
Henry Picard	3&2
Gene Sarazen
Sam Snead	8&7
Jim Foulis
Jimmy Hines	2&1
Byron Nelson

Semi-finals; July 15
Paul Runyan	4&3
Henry Picard
Sam Snead	1up
Jimmy Hines

Finals; July 16
Paul Runyan	8&7
Sam Snead

== Final match scorecards ==
Morning

Hole	1	2	3	4	5	6	7	8	9	10	11	12	13	14	15	16	17	18
Par	4	4	5	4	3	4	5	4	4	5	4	3	4	4	4	3	5	3
(United States) Runyan	4	4	4	3	3	4	5	4	4	5	3	2	4	4	4	3	4	3
(United States) Snead	4	4	5	3	3	4	5	4	5	5	4	3	4	4	5	3	4	3
Leader	–	–	R1	R1	R1	R1	R1	R1	R2	R2	R3	R4	R4	R4	R5	R5	R5	R5

Afternoon

Hole	1	2	3	4	5	6	7	8	9	10	11	12	13	14	15	16	17	18
Par	4	4	5	4	3	4	5	4	4	5	4	3	4	4	4	3	5	3
(United States) Runyan	4	3	4	4	3	5	5	3	4	4	4	Runyan wins 8 and 7						
(United States) Snead	4	4	5	4	3	4	5	4	4	5	4	Runyan wins 8 and 7						
Leader	R5	R6	R7	R7	R7	R6	R6	R7	R7	R8	R8	Runyan wins 8 and 7						

Birdie	Bogey

== Video ==
- You Tube – 1938 PGA Championship final
