= Worthington Mower Company =

Defunct American mower and tractor manufacturer

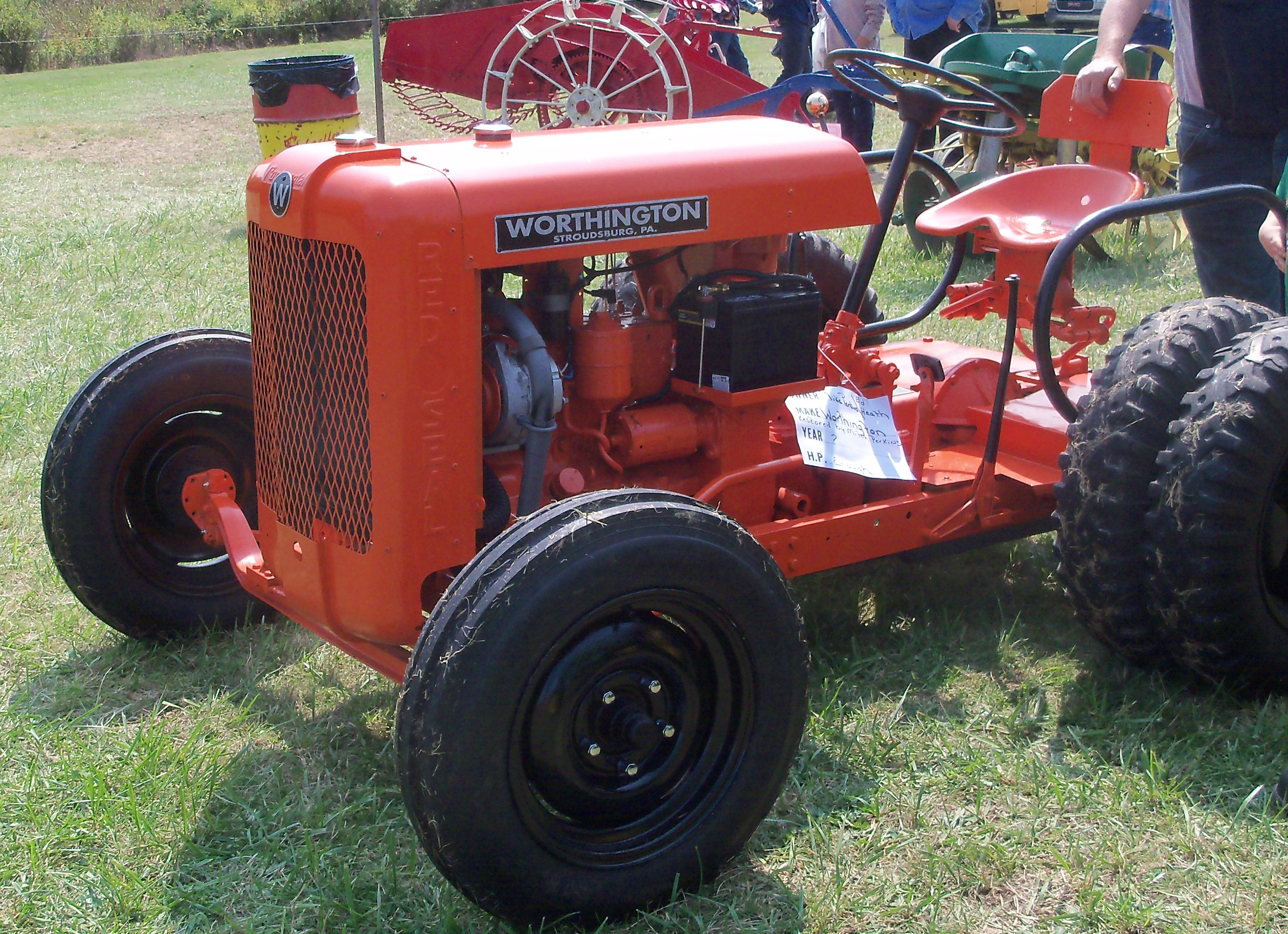
- Red Seal tractor with Continental engine
- Industry: Tractor manufacturing
- Founded: c. 1920
- Founder: Charles Campbell Worthington
- Defunct: c. 1959
- Fate: Acquired 1945
- Successor: Jacobsen Manufacturing
- Headquarters: Stroudsburg, Pennsylvania, United States
- Products: Tractors, lawnmowers

The Worthington Mower Company, originally called the Shawnee Mower Factory, produced lawn mowers and light-duty tractors in the United States from the early 1920s until around 1959. Founded by Charles Campbell Worthington and run as a family business, in 1945 it was purchased by Jacobsen Manufacturing. It continued to produce tractors and mowers in Stroudsburg, Pennsylvania, until around 1959.

== Background ==
Charles Campbell Worthington (1854–1944) was a successful businessman, owner of the Worthington Pump and Machinery Corporation. In the late 1890s he began to spend an increasing amount of time at his country home in Shawnee on Delaware, in Pennsylvania on the banks of the Delaware River, about 75 miles (121 km) to the west of New York. He built his first small golf course around 1898. Worthington sold his interests in Worthington Pump in 1899 when it merged with other pump manufacturers to become the International Steam Pump Company. He remained as president at first, but in 1900 retired to live in the country.

Worthington remained an active mechanical engineer and founded the Worthington Automobile Company, which built several steam automobiles to his designs. Near Shawnee he built the Buckwood Inn, an exclusive resort, with an eighteen-hole golf course. The course was designed by A. W. Tillinghast. This later became the Shawnee Country club. The course was completed around 1910. In 1912 Worthington invited professional golfers to compete on his course, and this led to the foundation of the Professional Golfers' Association of America.

== History ==
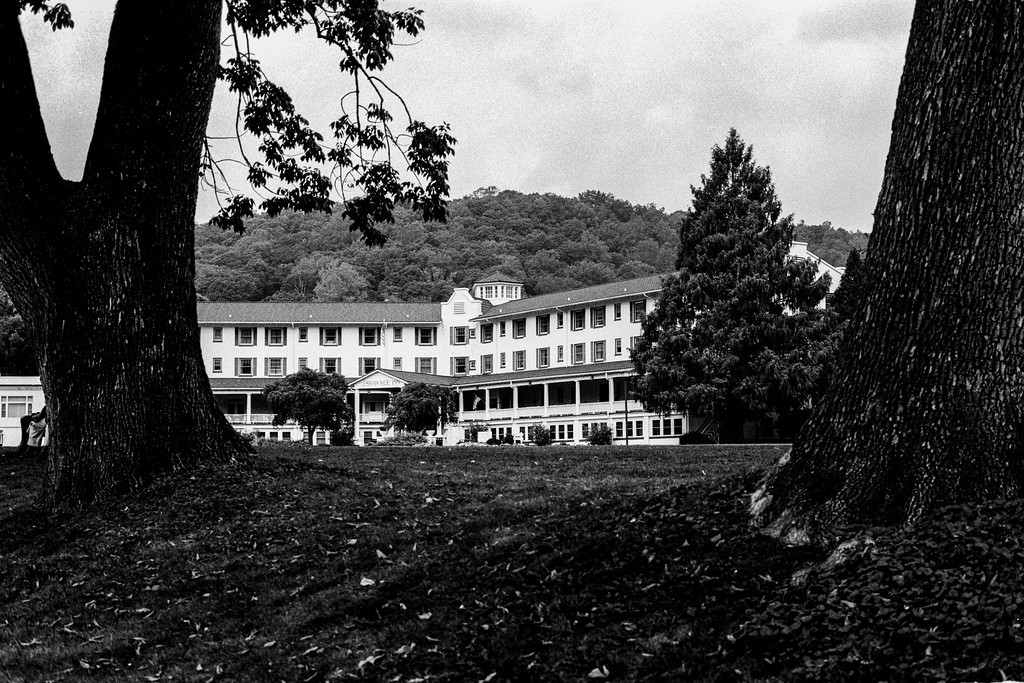
Shawnee Inn, originally the Buckwood Inn

After trying unsuccessfully to keep the fairways in shape by grazing sheep on them, Worthington designed the gang mower with three moving wheels. He launched the Shawnee Mower Factory to manufacture it. Later this became the Worthington Mower Company, based in nearby Stroudsburg, Pennsylvania. The first Worthington gang mower was three-wheeled, pulled by horses with their hooves covered in leather to prevent damage to the grass. In 1919 Worthington designed and built a gasoline-powered tractor to pull the mowers.

The Worthington tractors were assembled in Stroudsburg, Pennsylvania, using parts from the Model T Ford. Worthington saw there was demand from farmers for a low-priced tractor that could economically handle light loads. He produced the Worthington Model T until 1930, and then the Worthington Model A based on components from the Ford Model A. The company made about 430 Model T tractors and just over 400 Model A tractors. In 1928 the company introduced the triplex Overgreen mower, powered by an engine made for them by the Indian Motocycle Company of Springfield, Massachusetts. The next year they began using engines made specially for them by the Harley Davidson Motor Company of Milwaukee, Wisconsin. In the late 1930s, Worthington produced the Model C using a Chrysler six-cylinder engine and transmission and axles from the Dodge pick-up.

The gang mower coupled conventional lawn mower cutting units into a frame in such a way that each unit could move independently to adapt to the variable terrain, and to handle turns, while avoiding slipping and damaging the turf. The design was patented, as were various improvements that increased the number of cutting units to five, and then to seven, this last cutting a 17 feet (5.2 m) swathe at a speed of around 15 miles per hour (24 km/h). In 1935 Worthington won a case against a competitor for infringing his patents after taking the case to appeal. The gang mowers were adopted by golf courses across the country. In 1930 the company won a contract to supply mowers to the Air Corps for mowing airfields based on technical superiority, despite not being the lowest bid. After appeal, the contract was cancelled on the grounds that the specifications had been devised so that only Worthington could qualify.

Production continued during World War II, and the company earned 'E' and 'Star' awards from the Army-Navy. As well as being used to maintain the grass on airfields, the tractors were used to pull airplanes and trailers carrying bombs. Another use was to tow sickle-bar mowers used to maintain the verges of roads. Worthington died in October 1944. The company was sold in 1945 to Jacobsen Manufacturing.

Worthington made cabs on some of their 1946 Chief models, most likely used for airports, where they would pull aircraft as tugs and mow strips of grass with gang mowers along the runways. In 1949 the subsidiary began making Model G tractors using Ford tractor components, mostly for use in parks and golf courses. The company introduced new products, such as a tractor-mounted compressor in 1955. It continued to make lawnmowers in Stroudsburg for golf course maintenance and for residential use until it closed around 1959. Jacobsen manufactured under the Worthington brand until the mid-1960s.

== Sources ==
- "A-32080 Advertising-Bids-Specifications". Decisions of the Comptroller General of the United States. United States General Accounting Office. 1931.
- Buffington, Davis (28 September 1935). "WORTHINGTON MOWER CO. v. GUSTIN". Circuit Court, Third Circuit.
- Davis, Gerry Hempel (2011-11-16). Romancing the Roads: A Driving Diva's Firsthand Guide, East of the Mississippi. Taylor Trade Publishing. p. 69. ISBN 978-1-58979-620-1.
- Ladage, Cindy (9 December 2009). "Tennessean's rare tractor was made for golf courses". Farm World.
- Maurer, Joe (September–October 1999). "C. C. Worthington and the Worthington Mower". Gas Engine Magazine.
- O'Clair, Jim (February 2012). "1952 Worthington Model G". Hemmings Motor News.
- "Tractor-mounted compressor offered by Worthington Mower". American Potato Journal. 32 (9): 355–356. September 1955. doi:10.1007/BF02898433. S2CID 12707858.
- "Worthington Overgreen". Reel Lawn Mower.
