= Worthington Automobile Company =

Defunct American motor vehicle manufacturer

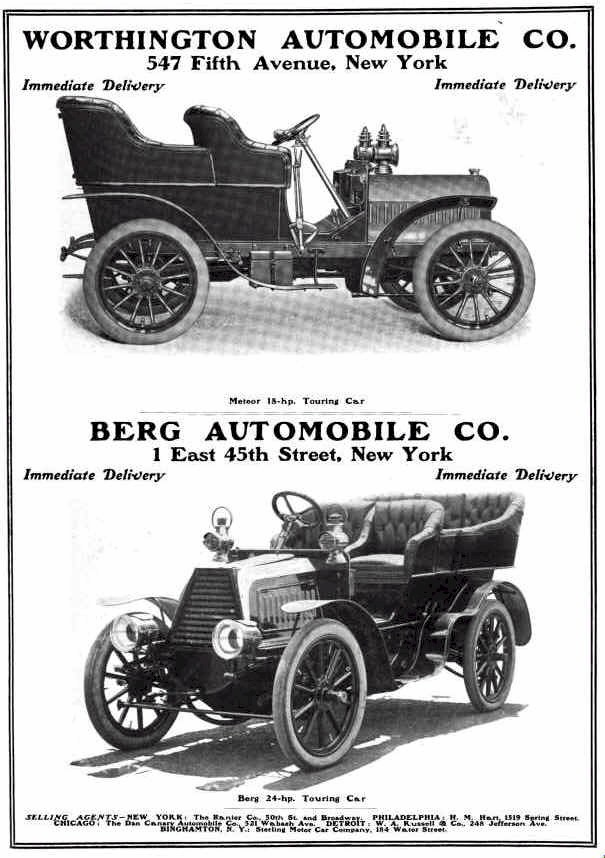
- 1904 advertisement from Horseless Age magazine
- Founded: 1904
- Defunct: 1905

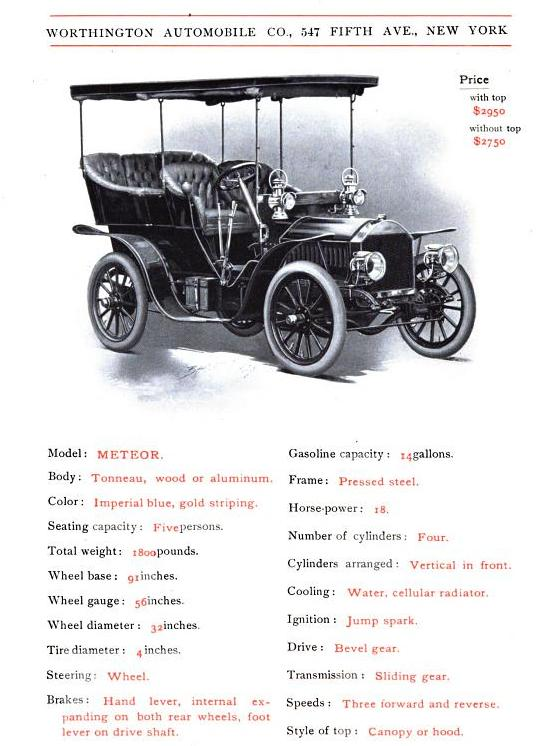
1904 Worthington Meteor

The Worthington Automobile Company was a short-lived automobile manufacturer in the United States that made automobiles between 1904 and 1905.

The company was founded by Charles Campbell Worthington, formerly head of the Worthington Pump and Machinery Corporation. After retiring from that position, he designed and built six Worthington Meteor steam automobiles. He then became interested in gasoline engines and organized the Worthington Automobile Company. This company built several types of pleasure car. Worthington was financed by the Vanderbilt fortune.

In 1904 Horseless Age Magazine reported that the leaders of the Worthington Automobile Company, had purchased the rights and property of the Berg Automobile Company. The Berg company would retain its name. The Worthington company would sell the 18-horsepower Berg under the name of the Meteor. A new garage was being built between West 49th and 50th streets. Charles C. Worthington was president of the company and H. Rossiter Worthington was secretary and treasurer. In August 1904 the Worthington Automobile Company entered their Meteor and Berg cars in the Long Branch, New Jersey, automobile races, and in the five-mile pick up race finished first and second.

The 1904 Worthington Bollee had a four-cylinder motor with an average of 24 hp rising to 30 hp at maximum rpm. The Bollee was from a French design (Léon Bollée Automobiles) and the Berg was German. In 1905 Berg cars were built by Worthington, which was also building its first Meteor cars. The Meteor, built between 1905 and 1906, was a five-seat tonneau with an 18 hp engine in an aluminum motor block rated between 200 and 1,000 rpm. By the end of 1905 the Berg-Worthington collaboration had failed.

Later Worthington created a country resort and golf course at Shawnee-on-Delaware. He invented a gang lawnmower to maintain the greens, and founded the Shawnee Mower Company to build the mowers. This company remained in business until around 1959.
