= Shawnee Mountain Ski Area =

Ski resort in eastern Pennsylvania

Shawnee Mountain
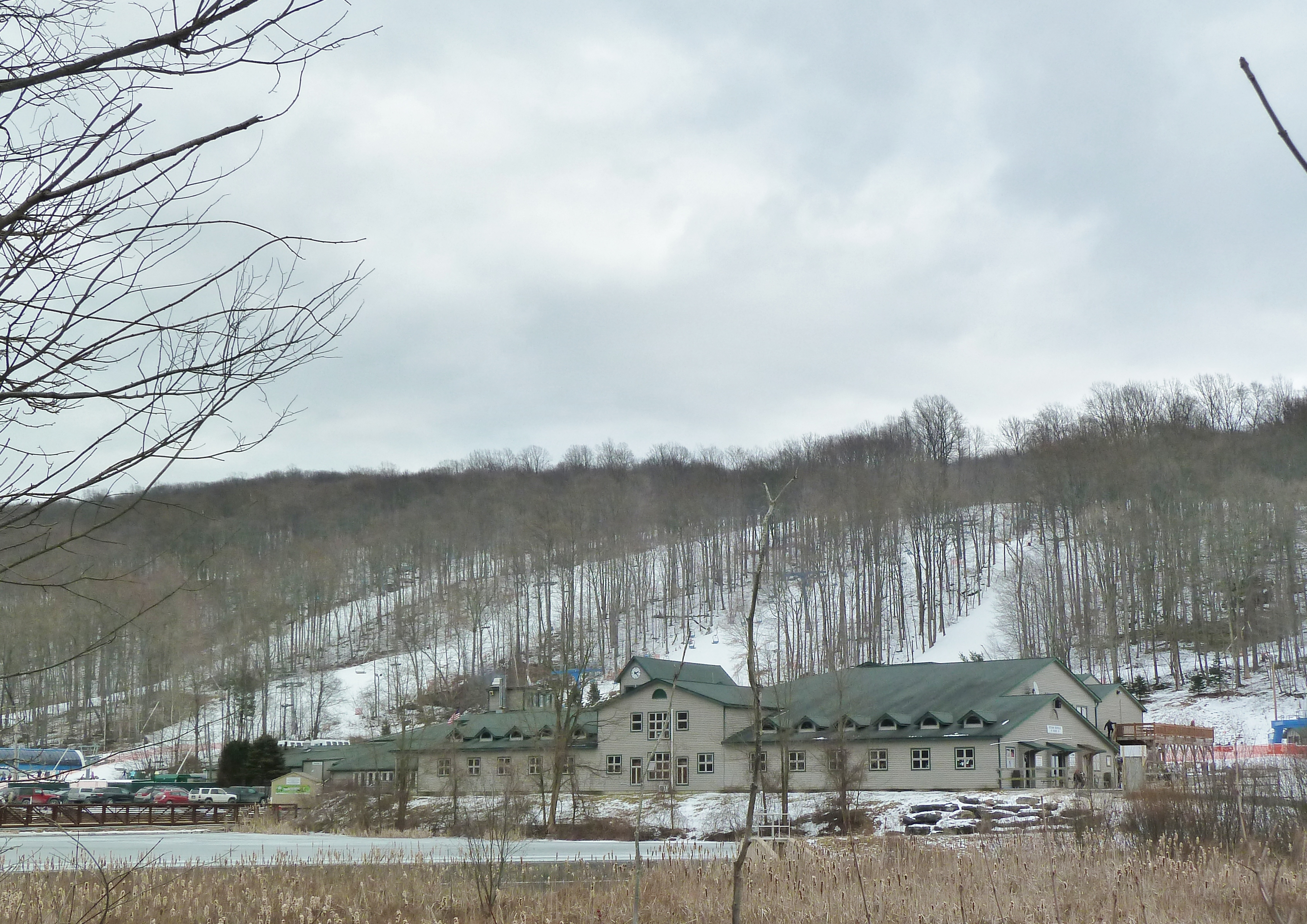
- Base lodge and lower slopes
- Interactive map of Shawnee Mountain
- Location: Middle Smithfield Township / Smithfield Township, Monroe County, Pennsylvania, U.S.
- Nearest city: East Stroudsburg, Pennsylvania, U.S.
- Coordinates: 41°2′27″N 75°5′0″W
- Vertical: 700 ft (210 m)
- Top elevation: 1,351 ft (412 m)
- Skiable area: 125 acres (51 ha)
- Trails: 23 total
- Longest run: 5,100 ft (1,600 m)
- Lift system: 9 total. 1 high-speed detachable quad chair, 1 fixed-grip quad chair, 4 Doubles, 4 Surface Lifts
- Terrain parks: 2 total
- Website: http://www.shawneemt.com

Shawnee Mountain is a family owned, operated, and oriented ski resort in eastern Pennsylvania located right outside East Stroudsburg, Pennsylvania, off of I-80, exit 309, next to the Delaware River in the easternmost portion of the Poconos.

Shawnee Mountain has a summit elevation of 1,350 feet (410 m) and vertical elevation change of 700 ft (210 m) There are 125 acres (0.51 km^{2}) of skiing terrain. The mountain has a total of 23 trails, the longest of which is 5,100 feet (1,554 m), and two terrain parks. The Delaware and Country Club terrain parks features jumps, boxes and rails. Shawnee has 23 slopes and trails, two terrain parks, and a seven lane snow-tubing park with a total area of 125 acres.

The mountain also features 100% snow making, night skiing, and snow tubing. The mountain summit receives an average of 50 inches (1,300 mm) of snow fall each winter. The base building houses lounges, restaurant and bars, rental and repair shops, locker facilities, and offices. There is an additional lodge at the summit which offers a bar and food services. There is a Mini Monster Mountain play area for young children. A ski school is on the premises and also a world renown children's program for kids as young as 3 and up to 15 years old.

== Lifts ==
Shawnee Mountain has nine lifts. Its main lift is a high speed-Detachable chairlift from Doppelmayr CTEC that was bought in 2010. This quad lift reaches the top in only three minutes and is called Tomahawk Express, operating at over 1,000 feet per minute (300 m/min). The Tomahawk installation took the alignment of the Arrowhead chairlift, a Partek lift which was relocated from its original 1996 alignment. This lift in turn had replaced the original Borvig Arrowhead and Tomahawk doubles. There is a double-double chairlift (two chairlifts together). Partek renovated this 80s-era Borvig installation in 2001. The doube double has undergone resurfacing and rebuilding for the 24/25 season. There is another Borvig double chairlift called the Bushkill Chairlift that takes people over the Bushkill and Benekill trails. This is a very narrow chairlift and the longest one. Then at the beginner's hill, there is another small Borvig double chairlift. Next to it is a magic carpet lift. Then at the learning center is another magic carpet. Also, there is a snowtubing magic carpet and 7 tubing lanes.

== Mountain History ==
Shawnee Mountain, located in the Poconos region of Pennsylvania, was established in 1975. The idea for the ski resort emerged from developer Karl Hope's need to supplement his existing summer investments in the area. Hope owned The Shawnee Inn and had various ventures on the Delaware River. To create a year-round attraction, Hope decided to develop a ski resort, leveraging his experience with smaller ski areas in the Northeast.

In October 1974, construction began on Shawnee Mountain with the cutting of four original trails and the installation of two lifts. Designed initially as an upside-down mountain, the lodge and parking were situated at the top, allowing skiers to descend and then take the lift back up. This design provided unobstructed views of the surrounding mountains and valleys, enhancing the aesthetic appeal of the resort.

Opening Season

Shawnee Mountain opened for its first season in December 1975. The initial trails included Country Club, The Pennsylvanian (now Upper PA), The Delaware, The Shawnee (now Upper Arrowhead), and The Meadows. The mountain’s design utilized the natural terrain to create wide slopes and varied terrain levels suitable for beginners.

During the first season, the Summit Lodge was not fully completed, so operations such as rentals, ticketing, and food service were conducted from a trailer. Complimentary hot cocoa and coffee were provided to guests from this temporary setup. At that time, adult lift tickets were priced at $6, with equipment rentals available for an additional $6. Group lessons at the Jean-Claude Killy Ski School were offered for $4 per person. The mountain operated until 4:30 PM each day, as there were no lights for night skiing.

Jean-Claude Killy

In 1975, Jean-Claude Killy joined Shawnee Mountain as the ski operations manager. His responsibilities included consulting on trail designs, ski school programs, and ski racing programs. He established the Jean-Claude Killy Ski School, which operated from 1975 to 1980, using trained international instructors to offer private and group lessons. The school employed the Graduated Length Method, starting skiers on shorter skis and gradually moving to longer skis as they progressed. This method is still used in a variation today.

Jean-Claude Killy had a villa in Shawnee Village, where he stayed during his visits to the Poconos. His partnership with Karl Hope and Shawnee Mountain helped promote the mountain as a reputable ski area. Killy's involvement was a strategic marketing move, but he genuinely contributed to the mountain's development and spent significant time there each winter. By combining his expertise and celebrity status, Jean-Claude Killy played a crucial role in the growth and reputation of Shawnee Mountain as a premier ski destination.

Base Area Construction

Shawnee Mountain opened in December 1975 as an upside-down mountain with the lodge and parking area situated at the summit. After three successful winter seasons, it became evident that expansion was necessary due to growing popularity. The access road to the Summit Lodge proved dangerous and difficult to maintain, and the summit parking lot was insufficient. The cost of maintaining the road surpassed the expense of snowmaking, prompting the decision for change.

In 1978, construction began in the base area. The initial phase involved clearing land and marking spaces for buildings, parking, and a snowmaking pond. Guests would enter via a footbridge into a base area designed to create an immediate aesthetic experience, with parking lots arranged to enhance the visual appeal.

The original footbridge was constructed using oak and maple planks cleared from the mountain during trail cutting. Other elements of the property were repurposed as well, such as the rocks used to build the fireplace in the Hope Lodge. These rocks were salvaged from old farmland property markers and repurposed for the lodge's fireplace, completed in the early 1980s.

The first building at the base of the mountain, named the Base Lodge, housed a cocktail lounge, a small cafeteria, a ski shop, and areas for rentals and repairs. As the infrastructure expanded, this lodge was relocated and repurposed. During this period, the Summit Lodge remained operational.

In the 1983-84 season, Shawnee Mountain introduced night skiing by installing lights along most trails and extending operating hours. This season also saw the debut of the Hope Lodge, featuring original greenhouse windows facing the slopes. The increased number of skier visits necessitated a larger parking lot, more food service options, and a broader range of services, including lessons, preferred lift line tickets, nursery care, and cross-country skiing.

Throughout the 1990s, development in the base area continued, shaping the final form of Shawnee Mountain's infrastructure. This period saw various enhancements that contributed to the mountain's reputation and functionality.

== Shawnee Peak ==
In 1988, Shawnee Mountain's ownership sought to expand their influence and acquired Pleasant Mountain in Bridgton, Maine. Pleasant Mountain, now the oldest ski area in Maine, was renamed Shawnee Peak to align with the Shawnee brand. Under Shawnee Mountain's leadership, significant improvements were made, including the installation of new lifts, snowmaking equipment, and lodge renovations. These upgrades resulted in a substantial increase of 65,000 skier visits in the first year.

In 1994, Shawnee Mountain sold Shawnee Peak to Chet Homer, the founder of Tom's of Maine. Despite the change in ownership, the legacy of Shawnee Mountain's improvements and community-focused programs continued to influence Shawnee Peak. In 2022, Shawnee Peak reverted to its original name, Pleasant Mountain, to honor its history and avoid confusion with Shawnee Mountain in Pennsylvania.

== Shawnee Mountain Today ==
The Winter Season

Shawnee Mountain is typically open from the end of November (post Thanksgiving) through mid to late March, depending on conditions and weather. Spring-like skiing conditions take place through March. Shawnee Mountain depends on 100% snowmaking to open trails throughout the season. Winter snow storms aren't as frequent but natural snow still covers trails during the season. The mountain has 23 trails from beginner to expert and two terrain parks.

Programming

Shawnee Mountain offers a variety of ski and snowboard lessons tailored to different age groups and skill levels.

For both adults and children, Shawnee Mountain offers group lessons using the progressive American Teaching Method. These lessons are available daily and cater to all skill levels. Private lessons are also available for those seeking personalized instruction at their own pace. Additionally, the mountain features youth development programs designed for intermediate skiers and snowboarders aged 7 and older, and adult development programs, both focusing on skill advancement.

Snow Tubing

Shawnee Mountain offers snow tubing.
