= 1950 PGA Championship =

Coordinates: 40.002°N 83.075°W

Tournament information
- Dates: June 21–27, 1950
- Location: Columbus, Ohio, U.S.
- Course: Scioto Country Club
- Organized by: PGA of America
- Tour: PGA Tour
- Format: Match play - 6 rounds

Statistics
- Par: 72
- Length: 7,032 yards (6,430 m)
- Field: 129 players, 64 to match play
- Cut: 153 (+11), playoff
- Prize fund: $17,700
- Winner's share: $3,500

Champion
- (United States) Chandler Harper
- def. Henry Williams, Jr., 4 and 3

Location in the United States
Location in Ohio

The 1950 PGA Championship was the 32nd PGA Championship, held June 21–27 at Scioto Country Club in Upper Arlington, Ohio, a suburb northwest of Columbus. Chandler Harper won the match play championship, 4 and 3 over Henry Williams, Jr. in the Tuesday final; the winner's share was $3,500 and the runner-up's was $1,500. It was Harper's only major title; his next best finish in a major was a tie for eighth at the Masters in 1947.

Defending champion Sam Snead won $250 as the medalist in the stroke play qualifier at 140 (−4), but lost in the second round. He regained the title, his third, in 1951 at age 39.

The last three majors were held within several weeks in 1950. The U.S. Open was concluded less than two weeks earlier near Philadelphia where Ben Hogan defeated Lloyd Mangrum and George Fazio in an 18-hole playoff on Sunday, June 11. The British Open was played the first week of July in Scotland.

== Format ==
The match play format at the PGA Championship in 1950 called for 12 rounds (216 holes) in seven days:

- Wednesday and Thursday – 36-hole stroke play qualifier, 18 holes per day;
  - defending champion Sam Snead and top 63 professionals advanced to match play
- Friday – first two rounds, 18 holes each
- Saturday – third round – 36 holes
- Sunday – quarterfinals – 36 holes
- Monday – semifinals – 36 holes
- Tuesday – final – 36 holes

== Final results ==
Tuesday, June 27, 1950

| Place | Player | Money ($) |
|---|---|---|
| 1 | (United States) Chandler Harper | 3,500 |
| 2 | (United States) Henry Williams, Jr. | 1,500 |
| T3 | (United States) Jimmy Demaret | 750 |
| T3 | (United States) Henry Picard | 750 |
| T5 | (United States) Dave Douglas | 500 |
| T5 | (United States) Ray Gafford | 500 |
| T5 | (United States) Lloyd Mangrum | 500 |
| T5 | (United States) Johnny Palmer | 500 |

== Final eight bracket ==
Quarter-finals; June 25
Chandler Harper | 1up
Lloyd Mangrum
Jimmy Demaret | 5&4
Ray Gafford
Henry Williams, Jr. | 1up
Dave Douglas
Henry Picard | 10&8
Johnny Palmer

Semi-finals; June 26
Chandler Harper | 2&1
Jimmy Demaret
Henry Williams, Jr. | 38h
Henry Picard

Finals; June 27
Chandler Harper | 4&3
Henry Williams, Jr.

== Final match scorecards ==
Morning

| Hole | 1 | 2 | 3 | 4 | 5 | 6 | 7 | 8 | 9 | 10 | 11 | 12 | 13 | 14 | 15 | 16 | 17 | 18 |
|---|---|---|---|---|---|---|---|---|---|---|---|---|---|---|---|---|---|---|
| Par | 4 | 4 | 4 | 3 | 4 | 5 | 4 | 5 | 3 | 4 | 4 | 5 | 4 | 3 | 4 | 4 | 3 | 5 |
| (United States) Harper | 4 | 4 | 4 | 4 | 4 | 5 | 4 | 5 | 4 | 4 | 3 | 5 | 5 | 3 | 4 | 5 | 4 | 4 |
| (United States) Williams | 5 | 5 | 5 | 3 | 4 | 5 | 5 | 5 | 4 | 4 | 5 | 4 | 5 | 3 | 4 | 5 | 3 | 5 |
| Leader | H1 | H2 | H3 | H2 | H2 | H2 | H3 | H3 | H3 | H3 | H4 | H3 | H3 | H3 | H3 | H3 | H2 | H3 |

Afternoon

| Hole | 1 | 2 | 3 | 4 | 5 | 6 | 7 | 8 | 9 | 10 | 11 | 12 | 13 | 14 | 15 | 16 | 17 | 18 |
|---|---|---|---|---|---|---|---|---|---|---|---|---|---|---|---|---|---|---|
| Par | 4 | 4 | 4 | 3 | 4 | 5 | 4 | 5 | 3 | 4 | 4 | 5 | 4 | 3 | 4 | 4 | 3 | 5 |
| (United States) Harper | 5 | 4 | 3 | 3 | 4 | 5 | 4 | 4 | 3 | 4 | 4 | 4 | 4 | 4 | 3 | Harper wins 4 and 3 | | |
| (United States) Williams | 4 | 4 | 4 | 3 | 4 | 4 | 4 | 5 | 3 | 4 | 4 | 6 | 4 | 3 | 4 | Harper wins 4 and 3 | | |
| Leader | H2 | H2 | H3 | H3 | H3 | H2 | H2 | H3 | H3 | H3 | H3 | H4 | H4 | H3 | H4 | Harper wins 4 and 3 | | |

| Birdie | Bogey |
