= 1958 PGA Championship =

Coordinates: 39.97°N 75.314°W

Tournament information
- Dates: July 17–20, 1958
- Location: Havertown, Pennsylvania
- Course: Llanerch Country Club
- Organized by: PGA of America
- Tour: PGA Tour
- Format: Stroke play

Statistics
- Par: 70
- Length: 6,710 yards (6,136 m)
- Field: 161 players 93 after first cut 64 after second cut
- Cut: 154 (+14) (first cut); 228 (+18) (second cut)
- Prize fund: $39,388
- Winner's share: $5,500

Champion
- (United States) Dow Finsterwald
- 276 (−4)

Location in the United States
Location in Pennsylvania

The 1958 PGA Championship was the 40th PGA Championship, played July 17–20 at Llanerch Country Club in Havertown, Pennsylvania, a suburb west of Philadelphia. It was the first PGA Championship held in its current stroke play format, 72 holes over four days, ending on Sunday. The previous editions were at match play, with the two most recent ones at seven rounds over five days, the final two rounds at 36 holes per match. The announcement of the change was made eight months earlier in November.

Dow Finsterwald, the runner-up in 1957, shot a final round 67 to win his only major title, two shots ahead of runner-up Billy Casper. Finsterwald's round-by-round scores were 67-72-70-67=276, 4-under-par on the par-70 course. Sam Snead led after 54 holes in pursuit of a fourth title, but faded to third with a final round 73 (+3). The winner's share was $5,500, down from the previous year's $8,000.

The Open Championship was held two weeks earlier in England at Royal Lytham & St Annes, with only two Americans in the field; Gene Sarazen finished 16th, but missed the first cut at the PGA Championship.

== Round summaries ==
Thursday, July 17, 1958

Place	Player	Score	To par
1	(United States) Dow Finsterwald	67	−3
2	(United States) Jay Hebert	68	−2
T3	(United States) Jimmy Demaret	69	−1
T3	(United States) Lionel Hebert	69	−1
T3	(United States) Ted Kroll	69	−1
T3	(United States) Dick Mayer	69	−1
T3	(United States) Felice Torza	69	−1
T8	(United States) Jack Burke Jr.	70	E
T8	(United States) Bob Crowley	70	E
T10	(United States) Leo Biagetti	71	+1
T10	(United States) Bill Collins	71	+1
T10	(United States) Buster Cupit	71	+1
T10	(United States) Cary Middlecoff	71	+1
T10	(United States) Bob Rosburg	71	+1
T10	(United States) Don Whitt	71	+1
T10	(United States) Art Wall Jr.	71	+1

=== Second round ===
Friday, July 18, 1958

Place	Player	Score	To par
T1	(United States) Dow Finsterwald	67-72=139	−1
T1	(United States) Jay Hebert	68-71=139	−1
T3	(United States) Julius Boros	72-68=140	E
T3	(United States) Billy Casper	73-67=140	E
T3	(United States) Sam Snead	73-67=140	E
T6	(United States) Bill Collins	71-70=141	+1
T6	(United States) Felice Torza	69-72=141	+1
T8	(United States) Tommy Bolt	72-70=142	+2
T8	(United States) Jack Burke Jr.	70-72=142	+2
T8	(United States) Doug Ford	72-70=142	+2
T8	(United States) Lionel Hebert	69-73=142	+2

=== Third round ===
Saturday, July 19, 1958

Place	Player	Score	To par
1	(United States) Sam Snead	73-67-67=207	−3
2	(United States) Billy Casper	73-67-68=208	−2
3	(United States) Dow Finsterwald	67-72-70=209	−1
4	(United States) Jack Burke Jr.	70-72-69=211	+1
T5	(United States) Doug Ford	72-70-70=212	+2
T5	(United States) Jay Hebert	68-71-73=212	+2
T7	(United States) Julius Boros	72-68-73=213	+3
T7	(United States) Mike Souchak	75-69-69=213	+3
T9	(United States) Buster Cupit	71-74-69=214	+4
T9	(United States) Dick Mayer	75-69-69=214	+4

=== Final round ===
Sunday, July 20, 1958

Place	Player	Score	To par	Money ($)
1	(United States) Dow Finsterwald	67-72-70-67=276	−4	5,500
2	(United States) Billy Casper	73-67-68-70=278	−2	3,500
3	(United States) Sam Snead	73-67-67-73=280	E	2,400
4	(United States) Jack Burke Jr.	70-72-69-70=281	+1	2,000
T5	(United States) Tommy Bolt	72-70-73-70=285	+5	1,600
T5	(United States) Julius Boros	72-68-73-72=285	+5	1,600
T5	(United States) Jay Hebert	68-71-73-73=285	+5	1,600
T8	(United States) Buster Cupit	71-74-69-73=287	+7	1,300
T8	(United States) Ed Oliver	74-73-71-69=287	+7	1,300
T8	(United States) Mike Souchak	75-69-69-74=287	+7	1,300
