= Henry Williams Jr. =

American golfer (1917–2002)

Personal information
- Full name: Henry E. Williams Jr.
- Nationality: United States
- Born: January 20, 1917 Reading, Pennsylvania, U.S.
- Died: February 8, 2002 (aged 85)
- Spouse: Louise B. Bennett
- Children: 5

Career
- Sport: Golf
- Status: Professional
- Former tour: PGA Tour
- Professional wins: 10

Number of wins by tour
- PGA Tour: 1
- Other: 9

Best results in major championships
- Masters Tournament: T47: 1951
- PGA Championship: 2nd: 1950
- U.S. Open: T36: 1952
- The Open Championship: DNP

Henry E. Williams Jr. (January 20, 1917 – February 8, 2002) was an American professional golfer who played on the PGA Tour in the 1950s and 1960s.

== Career ==
Williams was born in Reading, Pennsylvania, to Louise E. (née Amerault) and Henry E. Williams Sr. Like most professional golfers of his generation, Williams earned his living primarily as a club professional. Williams was a pro at the Tully-Secane Country Club in Secane, Pennsylvania. From 1951 to 1975, he was the head pro at the Berkleigh Country Club near Kutztown, Pennsylvania about halfway between Allentown and Reading. From 1976 until his retirement in 1993, he was head pro at Moselem Springs Country Club. He lived most of his adult life in Fleetwood, Pennsylvania.

Williams won once on the PGA Tour, the 1952 Tucson Open. His best finish in a major championship was runner-up at the 1950 PGA Championship. He was defeated by Chandler Harper (4 & 3) in the match play final. The tournament was held at Scioto Country Club in Columbus, Ohio. He was noted for excellence in the green-to-tee ball striking phase of the game, but was reputed to be a lousy putter.

== Personal life ==
Williams married Louise B. Bennett. They had three sons and two daughters. He died on February 8, 2002, in Laureldale.

== Awards and honors ==
- Williams, a life member of the PGA of America, was inducted into the Berks County Hall of Fame in 1985
- In 2001, he was inducted into the Pennsylvania Hall of Fame
- He was also inducted into the Philadelphia Section PGA Hall of Fame

== Professional wins ==
=== PGA Tour wins (1) ===
- 1952 Tucson Open

=== Other wins (9) ===
- 1949 Philadelphia PGA Championship
- 1951 Philadelphia Open Championship
- 1953 Philadelphia PGA Championship
- 1954 Pennsylvania Open Championship
- 1955 Philadelphia Open Championship
- 1958 Philadelphia PGA Championship
- 1962 Pennsylvania Open Championship, Jamaica Open
- 1968 Salisbury (Maryland) Open
