= Shawnee-Minisink Site =

- U.S. National Register of Historic Places
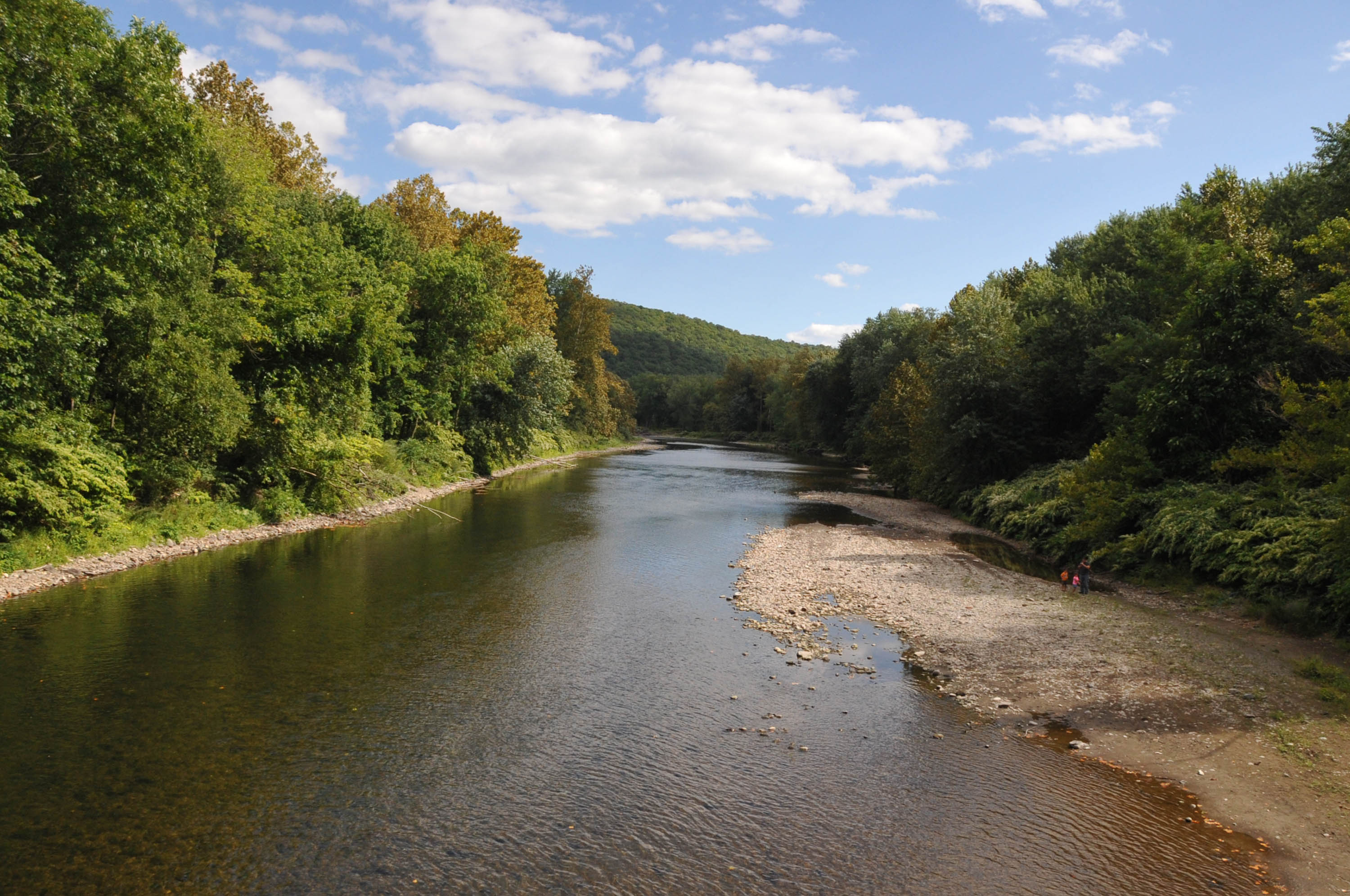

- Location within Pennsylvania Location within the United States
- Location: Confluence of Brodhead Creek and the Delaware River, Smithfield Township, Pennsylvania
- Coordinates: 40°59′25″N 75°08′2.7″W
- Area: less than one acre
- NRHP reference No.: 07001161
- Added to NRHP: November 9, 2007

Shawnee-Minisink Site is a prehistoric archaeological site located in Smithfield Township, Monroe County, Pennsylvania in the upper Delaware Valley. It was the site of a Paleoindian camp site. It was added to the National Register of Historic Places in 2007.

== Archaeology ==
The site covers an area of about 4,000 square meters with the Paleo-Indian and Early Archaic remains some meters below the ground. It was first excavated in 1972, in two short seasons (test squares with additional auguring totaling 38 square meters) by a non-scientist archaeologist Don Kline. From 1974 to 1977 it was excavated by an American University team led by Charles W. McNett Jr.

Additional excavations were conducted from 2003 to 2006 covering 40 square meters in an area south of the original excavations. Finds included a heavily reworked Clovis point and a number of scrapers and cores. Two hearths were found in the Clovis layer which when radiocarbon dated produced a mean date of 10,937 ± 15 years Before Present.
