= Buster Cupit =

American professional golfer (1927–2023)

Personal information
- Full name: John Winfred Cupit
- Nickname: Buster
- Nationality: United States
- Born: March 22, 1927 St. Louis, Missouri, U.S.
- Died: July 17, 2023 (aged 96) Longview, Texas, U.S.

Career
- Sport: Golf
- Status: Professional
- Former tour: PGA Tour
- Professional wins: 2

Best results in major championships
- Masters Tournament: CUT: 1959
- PGA Championship: T8: 1958
- U.S. Open: CUT: 1960, 1963
- The Open Championship: DNP

John Winfred "Buster" Cupit (March 22, 1927 – July 17, 2023) was an American professional golfer.

== Early life ==
Cupit was born in St. Louis, Missouri and grew up in Longview, Texas. His younger brother, Jacky Cupit, won four PGA Tour events.

== Professional career ==
Cupit worked primarily as a club pro but also played on the PGA Tour. In 1961, he almost won in consecutive tournaments only to finish second in both. At the St. Paul Open, he lost by one stroke to Don January after leading by two strokes after 54 holes. A week later, he trailed his brother Jacky by one stroke entering the final round of the Canadian Open, but shot 75 to finish in a tie for second, five strokes behind his brother. His last full season on the PGA Tour came in 1966 when he started 16 events. His best finish in a major was a T-8 at the 1958 PGA Championship.

Cupit owned and operated the Longview Country Club in Longview, Texas.

== Personal life ==
Cupit died in Longview on July 17, 2023, at the age of 96.

== Professional wins (2) ==
- 1958 Oklahoma Open
- 1965 Oklahoma Open
