= Berg Automobile =

Defunct American motor vehicle manufacturer

Berg Automobile Company was a manufacturer of automobiles in Cleveland, Ohio, established by Hart O. Berg and operational from 1903 to 1904. The New York Bergs were made by the Worthington Automobile Company.

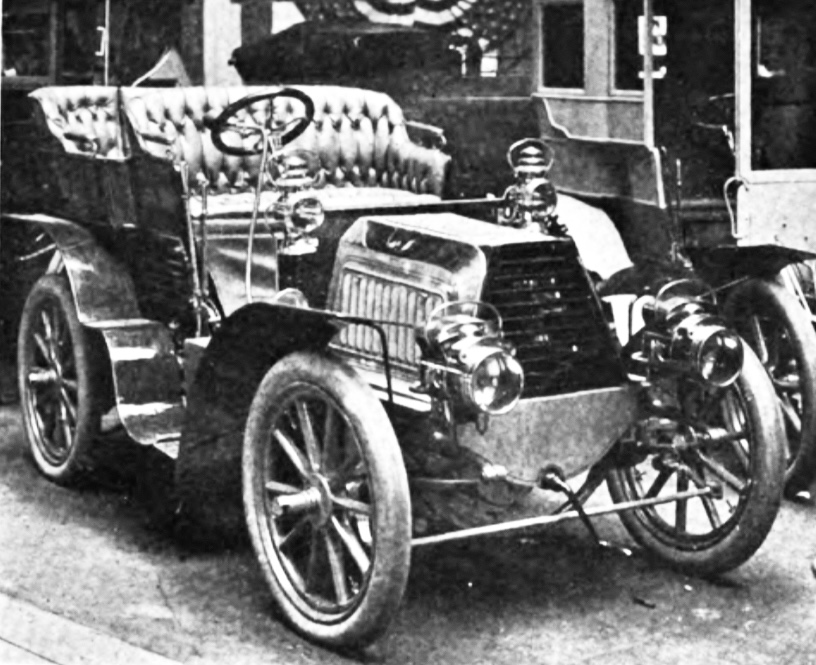
Berg Touring (1903)

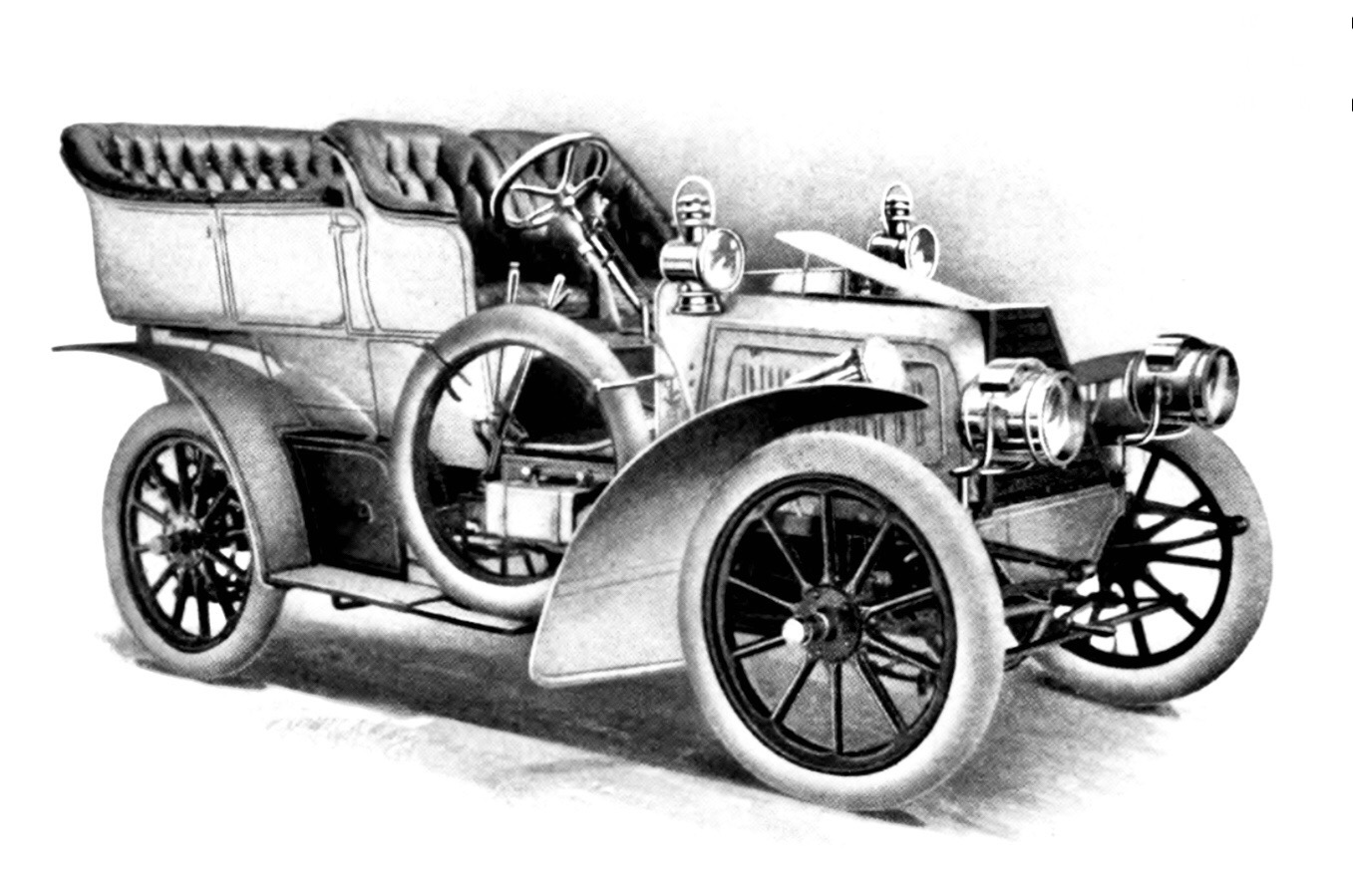
Berg 24 HP (1904-1905)

The 1904 Berg was a touring car model. Equipped with a tonneau, it could seat 6 passengers and sold for US$3500. The vertical-mounted straight-4, situated at the front of the car, produced 24 hp (17.9 kW). A 4-speed sliding transmission was fitted. The armored wood-framed car used semi-elliptic springs and was considered quite advanced for the time. The wheelbase was 90 inches long.

== Production models ==
- Berg 24 HP
