= Worthington Hall =

- Formerly listed on the U.S. National Register of Historic Places
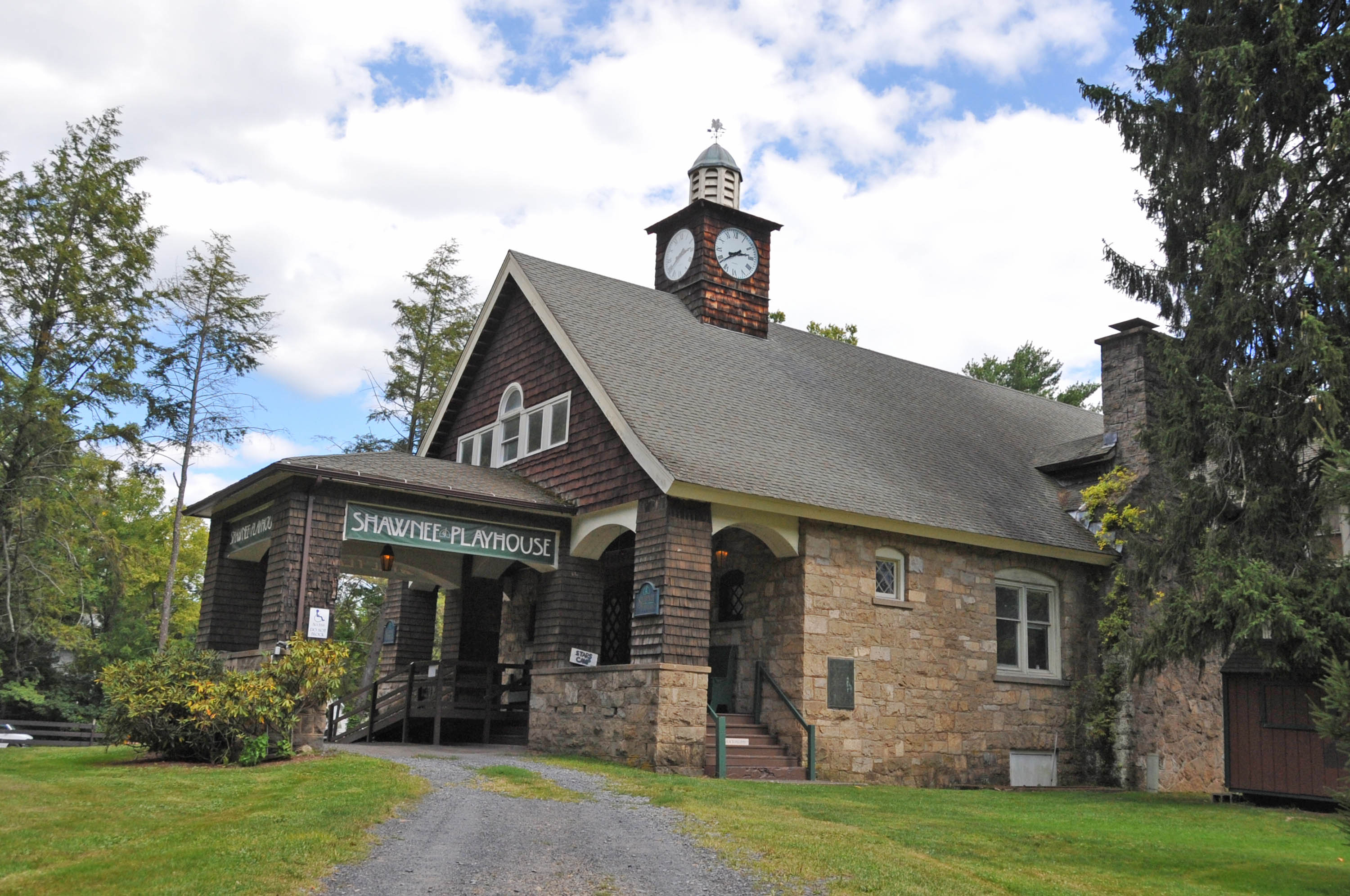
- The rebuilt hall is a copy of the original.

- Location within Pennsylvania Location within the United States
- Location: Worthington Ave. at Shawnee-on-the-Delaware, Smithfield Township, Pennsylvania
- Coordinates: 41°00′45.6″N 75°06′31.7″W
- Area: 0.8 acres (0.32 ha)
- Built: 1904
- NRHP reference No.: 78002433

Significant dates
- Added to NRHP: April 14, 1978
- Removed from NRHP: December 18, 1986

Worthington Hall, now known as the Shawnee Playhouse, was an historic theatre that was located in Smithfield Township, Monroe County, Pennsylvania, United States.

It was added to the National Register of Historic Places in 1978, but was delisted in 1986 after being demolished following a fire on June 24, 1985 that was caused by arson. It has since been rebuilt and now serves as a public entertainment venue.

== History and architectural features ==
Built in 1904 as a gift to residents of the village of Shawnee, Pennsylvania, Worthington Hall was incorporated in June of that year by the Monroe County Court. Its construction was funded by a $50,000 grant provided by C.C. Worthington, a New York resident and wealthy manufacturer of pumps. It was initially used as a public hall.

It was added to the National Register of Historic Places in 1978. It was delisted in 1986 after being demolished following a fire caused by arson on June 24, 1985. With help from the people of Shawnee on Delaware, the Seabees, the Hughes Foundation, the National Endowment for the Arts, The National Trust, a Community Development Block Grant, and generous donations from many individuals and friends, the playhouse was rebuilt.
