= Shawnee on Delaware, Pennsylvania =

Unincorporated community in Pennsylvania, US

Shawnee on Delaware
- Unincorporated community
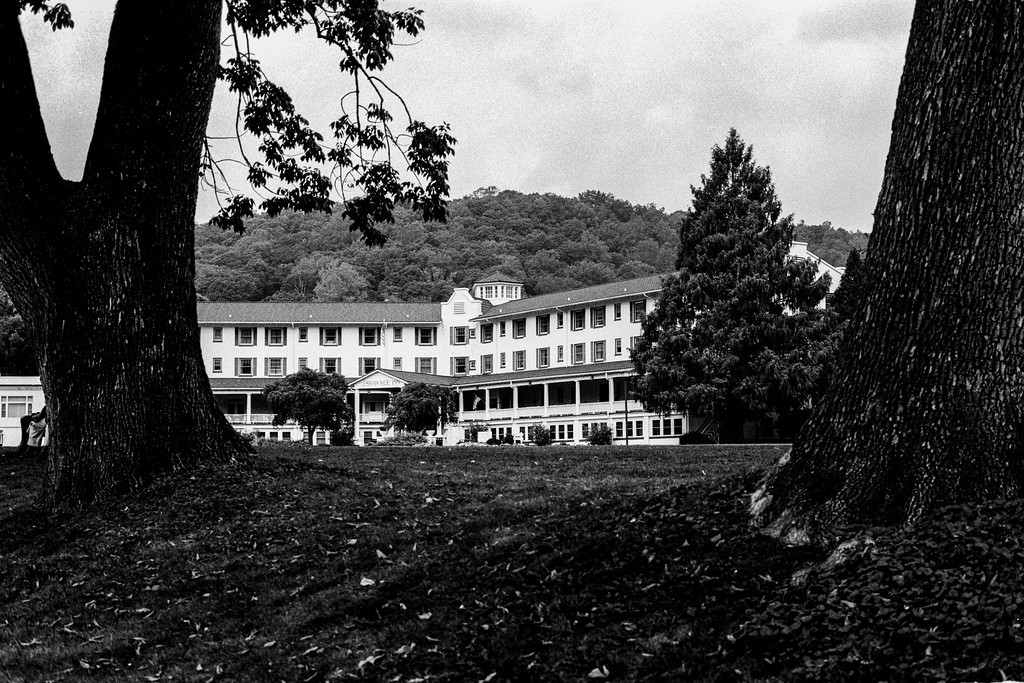
- Shawnee Inn, as seen from the banks of the Delaware River, September 2012

- Location within Pennsylvania
- Coordinates: 41.012309°N 75.110377°W
- Country: United States
- State: Pennsylvania
- County: Monroe
- Township: Smithfield
- Founder: Nicholas Depuy (1727)
- ZIP: 18356

Shawnee on Delaware is an unincorporated community on the Delaware River, part of Smithfield Township in Monroe County, Pennsylvania, United States. It is situated just south of the foothills of the Pocono Mountains, 2.6 miles (4.2 km) southwest of the Shawnee Mountain Ski Area.

The first white settler, Nicholas Depuy, arrived from New Amsterdam in 1727. His home was used as a fort during the French and Indian War (1754–1763). In 1904, Worthington Hall, later known as the Shawnee Playhouse, was built in the village. Shawnee is also the home of the Shawnee Inn and Golf Resort, originally built as the Buckwood Inn with a course designed by A. W. Tillinghast in the early 20th century. The largest red cedar tree in the state is situated at Shawnee Presbyterian Church Cemetery, standing 36 feet (11 m) high and 67 inches (1.7 m) around the trunk.

== History ==
Shawnee tribe refugees from Ohio settled in the area in 1692. The first white settler was Nicholas Depuy, from New Amsterdam, New York, who arrived in 1727 and bought 3,000 acres (1,200 ha) of land from the local Minsi tribe of Lenape Indians. During the French and Indian War (1754–1763) his home was used as a fort, and became known as Fort Depuy. The village was given its name by a surveyor sent by William Penn, who mistakenly thought the local Indians were Shawnee.

In 1736, a ferry began to operate, traveling from Shawnee between Shawnee Island and Depuy Island, then across the Delaware River to New Jersey. By 1740 Aaron Depuy was operating a store, and in 1753 he built a stone and log church used by ministers of the Dutch Reformed Church. The cornerstone of this church remains, now part of the Shawnee Presbyterian Church. The farming community grew steadily, using the river to transport produce. A post office was built in 1843, and a brick church was erected in 1853 on the foundation of the old stone and log church. Some of the original beams still remain, as well as the original sounding board. Judge J. Depue LeBar moved to Shawnee from Pahaquarry Township, New Jersey in about 1850, and by the end of the decade he'd opened a general store in the village. In 1888 the River School was built near Shawnee, made of stone and sporting a roof-framing system with wood and iron truss members.

Charles Campbell Worthington was a successful businessman, owner of the Worthington Pump and Machinery Corporation. In the late 1890s Worthington began to spend an increasing amount of time at his country home in Shawnee on Delaware, and in 1900 he retired to live in Shawnee. In 1904 he built Worthington Hall, later known as the Shawnee Playhouse. It was added to the National Register of Historic Places in 1978, but the building was de-listed in 1986 after being demolished following a fire caused by arson on June 24, 1985. The playhouse was rebuilt with help from the people of Shawnee on Delaware, the Seabees, the Hughes Foundation, the National Endowment for the Arts, The National Trust, a Community Development Block Grant, and others. Charles Campbell Worthington also established the Worthington Society, a society dedicated to ornithology which was directed by Charles W. Miller. The society caught over 300 pigeons on the grounds in less than three months.

== Geography ==
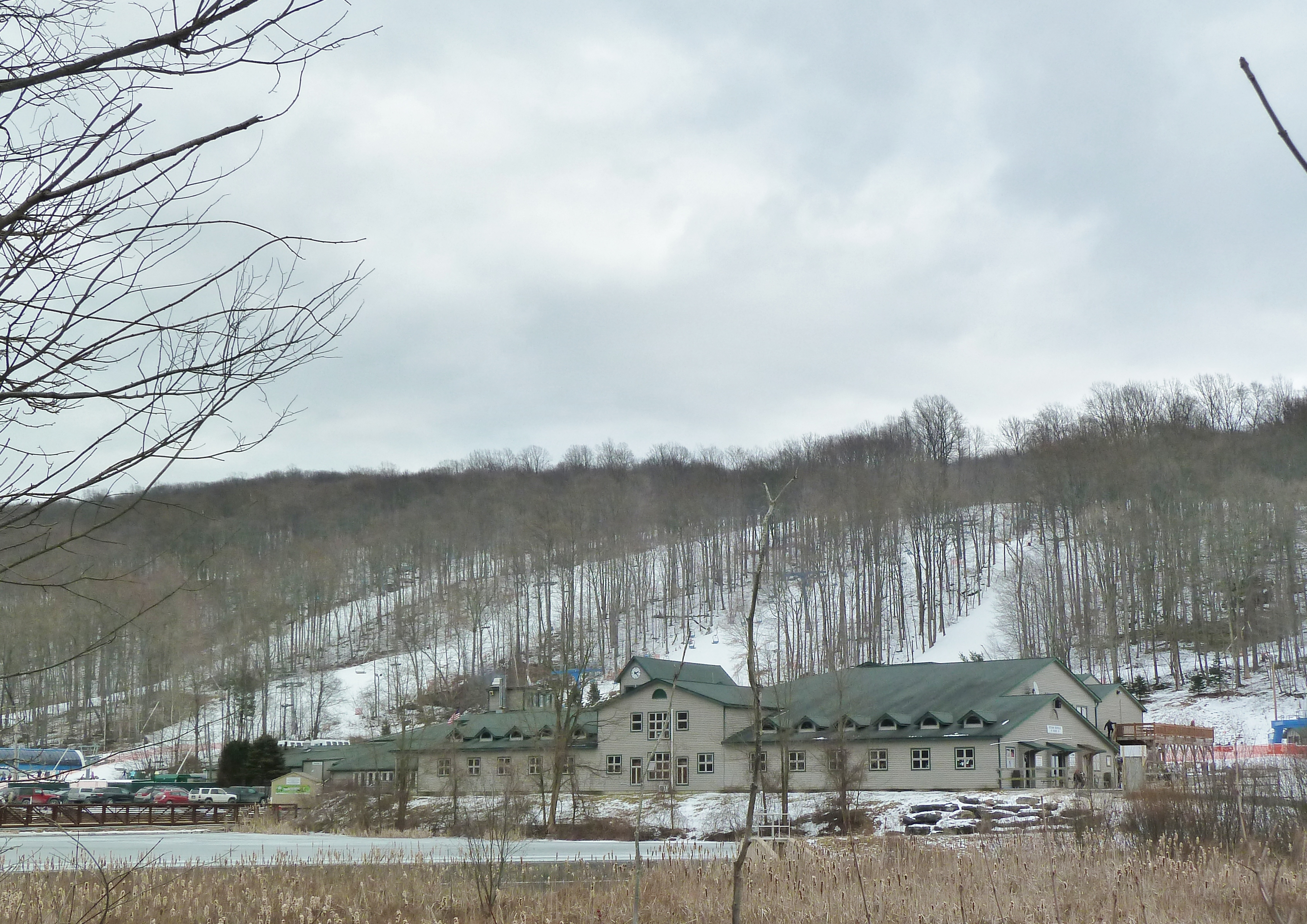
Shawnee Mountain Ski Area in East Stroudsburg

The village is just south of the foothills of the Pocono Mountains, and is 2.6 miles (4.2 km) southwest of the Shawnee Mountain Ski Area along a forested valley route. It is approximately 75 miles (121 km) to the west of New York City, and lies 5.9 miles (9.5 km) to the northeast of Stroudsburg. The village is separated from the main channel of the Delaware River by Depuy Island. Just downstream from this island is Swanee Island, now the location of the Shawnee Inn golf course. About 2.5 miles (4.0 km) upstream from Shawnee is Tocks Island, the site of a proposed controversial dam project following flooding on the river in 1955. The largest red cedar tree in the state is situated at Shawnee Presbyterian Church Cemetery, standing 36 feet (11 m) high and 67 inches (1.7 m) around the trunk, with a 36 feet (11 m) crown.

== Government ==
Although Shawnee on Delaware is an unincorporated community with no municipal or governmental structure of its own, it is subordinate to the local government of Smithfield Township and the county government of Monroe County. The Shawnee Preservation Society is a not-for-profit, voluntary organization, which functions under state law, dedicated to "preserving the quality of life in Shawnee-On-Delaware, Smithfield Township, and surrounding areas".

== Economy ==
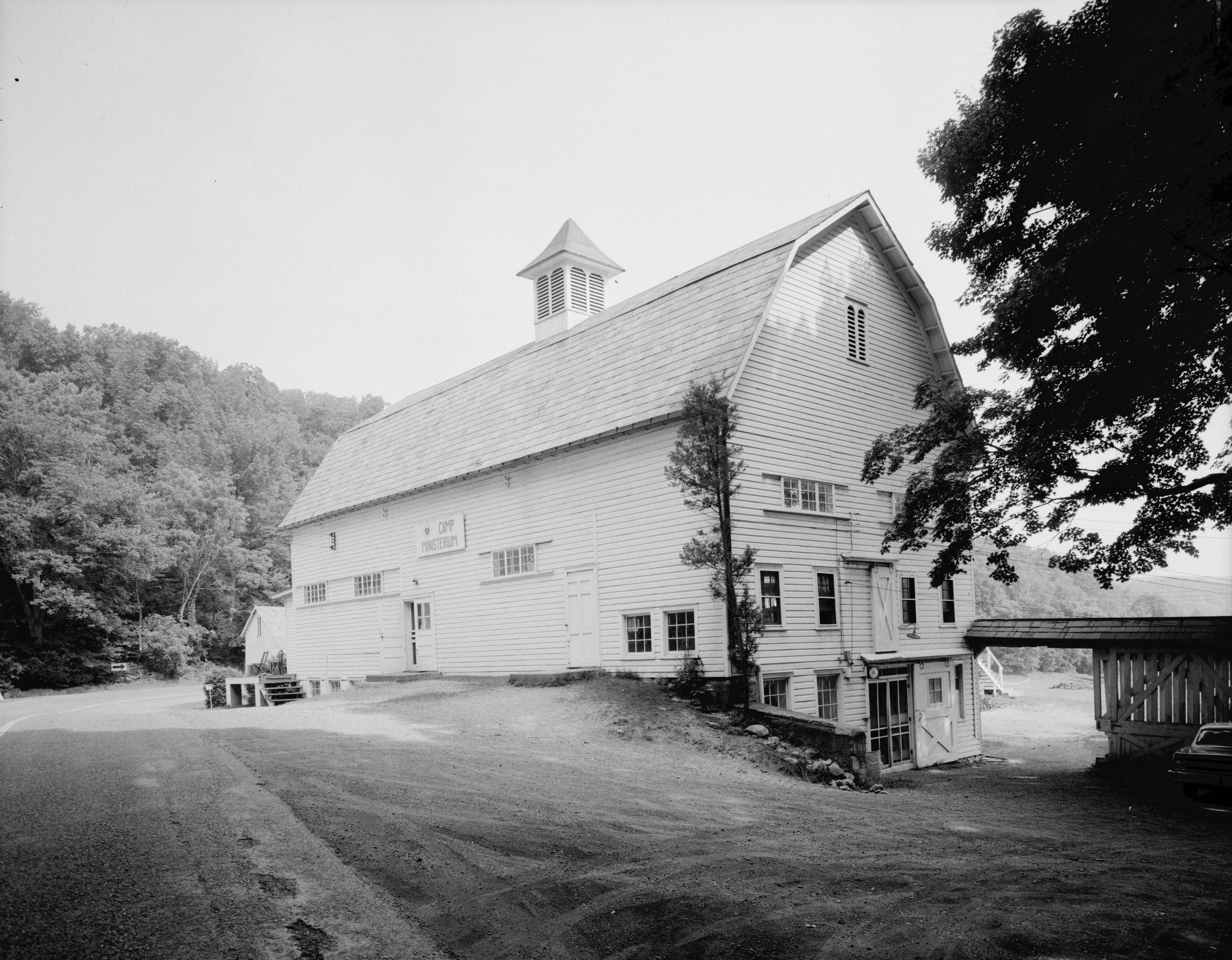
John Turn Farm barn in Middle Smithfield Township, 1970

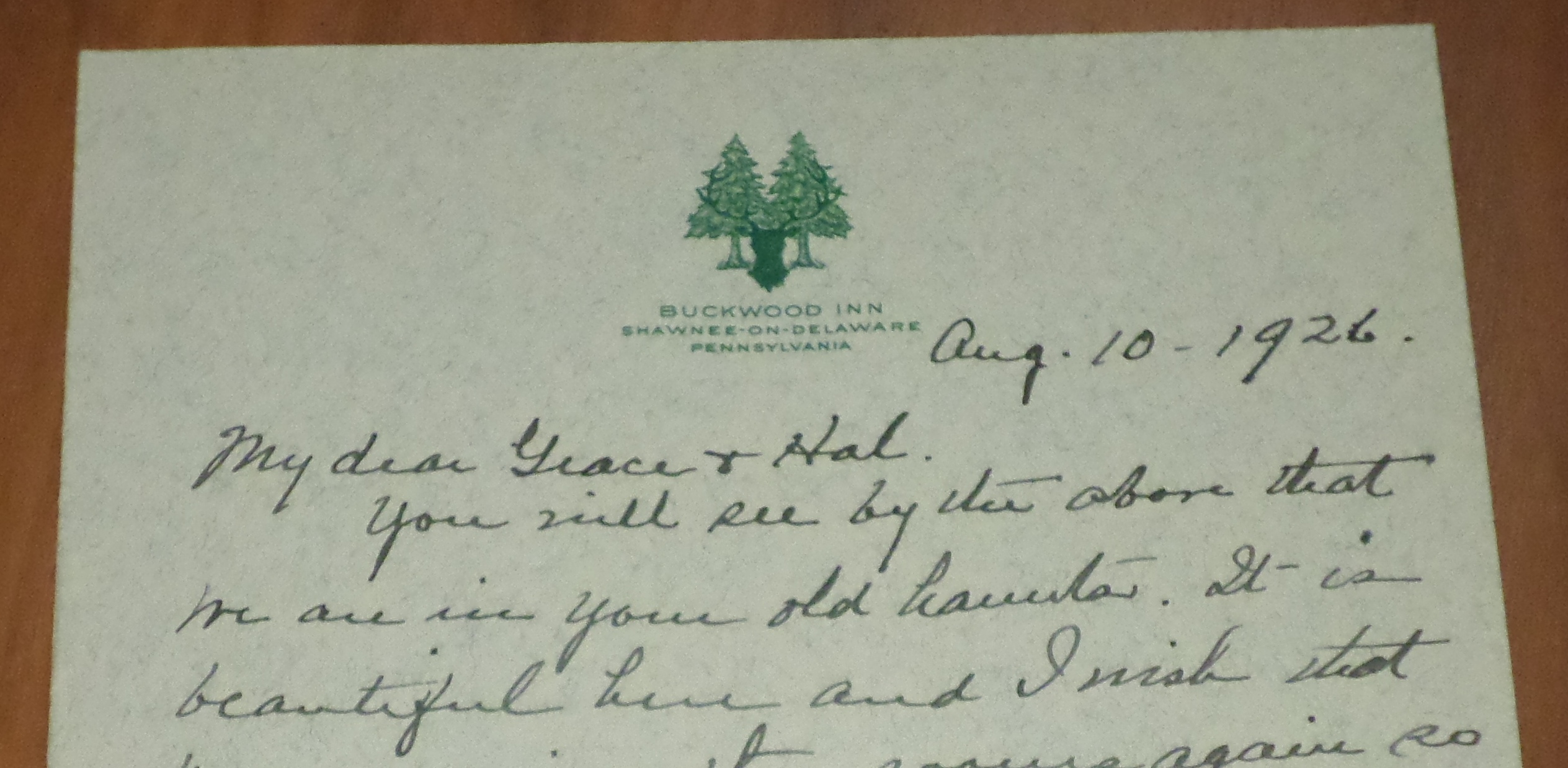
1926 letter on Buckwood Inn stationery

Lime, produced by burning limestone, was used to neutralize acidity and improve the fertility of the soil in the Shawnee area. One of the local farmers built a lime kiln into a slope on his property; the kiln on John Turn Farm is well-preserved and is listed as a historic place. Hiram, son of Judge J. Depue LeBar, farmed about three hundreds across on Shawnee Island, which included land of the present day golf course. A barn, 110 feet (34 m) long by 60 feet (18 m) was built which could hold some hundred tons of grain when full, with room to store forty acres of wheat and twenty acres of oats. A stone mill was also built in the vicinity, the first flour mill in Smithfield Township, which would be ground and loaded onto boats and sold in Philadelphia.

Worthington built the Buckwood Inn, an exclusive resort, with an eighteen-hole golf course designed by A. W. Tillinghast. This later became the Shawnee Country Club. The course was completed around 1910. In 1913, John McDermott won the Shawnee Open golf tournament at Shawnee-on-Delaware, ahead of top Englishmen Harry Vardon and Ted Ray. After trying unsuccessfully to keep the fairways in shape by grazing sheep on them, Worthington designed the gang mower with three moving wheels. He launched the Shawnee Mower Factory to manufacture it.

With the depression the inn's business suffered, and the building was not properly maintained. Worthington's family sold the inn in 1943 to Fred Waring, a famous choral master. Waring made the inn his base, and during the 1950s his radio programs featuring Fred Waring and his Pennsylvanians were broadcast from the Worthington Hall. During the 1940s and early 1950s, Waring and His Pennsylvanians produced a string of hits, selling millions of records. A few of his many choral hits include "Sleep," "Battle Hymn of the Republic," "Smoke Gets in Your Eyes," "Button Up Your Overcoat," "White Christmas," "Give Me Your Tired, Your Poor" and "Dancing in the Dark." Waring and some of his friends founded Words and Music Inc. in 1939. In 1947 he moved the company to Shawnee and renamed it the Shawnee Press. The company became a major publisher of sacred and secular music. In 2009 it was acquired by the Hal Leonard Corporation.

Many of Waring's celebrity friends visited the inn and played golf. Among them were Bob Hope, Art Carney, George Goebel, Arnold Palmer, Lucille Ball, Ed Sullivan, Eddie Fisher, Perry Como, President Dwight D. Eisenhower and Jackie Gleason. The golf architect Bill Diddle expanded the course to 27 holes. Waring sold the inn in 1974 to Philadelphia real estate developer Karl Hope, who expanded the operation and made it less exclusive, introducing timesharing and adding skiing and water activities. Hope established the Shawnee Mountain Ski Area which contributes to the income received in the Shawnee area, employing Olympic Gold medalist Jean-Claude Killy as director of ski operations.

== Media ==
WCSD-LP (104.9 FM) is a low-power FM radio station broadcasting a variety music format. The Federal Communications Commission issued a construction permit for the station on February 14, 2003. The station was assigned the WCSD-LP call sign on March 18, 2003. It received its license to cover on November 4, 2004. Licensed to Shawnee-on-Delaware, the station serves the Stroudsburg, Pennsylvania area and is currently owned by Shawnee Presbyterian Church.

== See also ==
- Fort Depuy
