= Lafayette Hill, Pennsylvania =

Unincorporated community in Pennsylvania, US

Lafayette Hill
- Unincorporated community
- Location of Lafayette Hill in Pennsylvania Lafayette Hill (the United States)
- Coordinates: 40°04′50″N 75°15′19″W
- Country: United States
- State: Pennsylvania
- County: Montgomery
- Township: Whitemarsh, Springfield
- Elevation: 259 ft (79 m)

Population (2010)
  - Total: 2,174
- Time zone: UTC-5 (EST)
  - Summer (DST): UTC-4 (EDT)
- ZIP Code: 19444
- Area codes: 610 and 484

Lafayette Hill is an unincorporated community, which is situated primarily within Whitemarsh Township, Montgomery County, Pennsylvania. A small part of this community is also located in Springfield Township.

Located just west of Philadelphia's Chestnut Hill neighborhood, and south of Plymouth Meeting, Lafayette Hill, which has also been known, historically, as "Barren Hill," draws its name from the French General Marquis de Lafayette, who encamped there with his soldiers during the American Revolution.

== History ==
Before the general decampment from Valley Forge in the spring of 1778, George Washington dispatched an estimated 2,200 troops under the command of Marquis de Lafayette to act as a defensive screen and to conduct reconnaissance of the British army, which had garrisoned in Philadelphia for the winter. The two forces had a brief engagement at nearby Barren Hill.

The community's post office name was officially changed from Barren Hill to Lafayette Hill in March 1883.

Lafayette Hill is an area with many parks and nature reserves. It is home to a Jewish community and Catholic population anchored by St. Philip Neri Church, Congregation Or Ami, and Whitemarsh Valley Country Club. Many people commute to Philadelphia to work. Its main transit system is SEPTA.

Lafayette Hill is home to the Barren Hill Volunteer Fire Company, one of the oldest fire companies in the area. It was founded after a fire destroyed a farm along with several livestock in 1915. Currently, Barren Hill Fire Company has roughly 400 to 500 calls for service each year. Their 1977 firehouse is located on 641 Germantown Pike. Whitemarsh Township is also served by the Spring Mill Fire Company.

Lafayette Hill is served by the Colonial School District.

Notable people from Lafayette Hill, Pennsylvania include: Terrence Howard, John Salmons, Da'Rel Scott, Brad Furman, Reece Whitley, billionaire Michael G. Rubin,

== Demographics ==
The 2016 Lafayette Hill, Pennsylvania, population was 10,796. There were 2,229 people per square mile (population density). The racial makeup of the town was 88.48% White, 4.47% African American, 4.62% Asian, 0.00% Native American, and 0.00% 'Other'. 1.95% of the people in Lafayette Hill (zip 19444), Pennsylvania, claim hispanic ethnicity (meaning 98.06% are non-hispanic).

In 2016, the median age was 44.5 years old. 56.60% of people in Lafayette Hill, Pennsylvania, were married. 8.65% were divorced. The average household size was 2.38 people. 37.32% of people were married, with children. 13.56% had children, but were single. The average household income was $190,170. The median household income was $142,315.
