= Llanerch Country Club =

Golf club in Haverford Township, Pennsylvania

- Location within Philadelphia
- 39°58′12″N 75°18′45″W

Club information
- Established: 1919
- Type: Private
- Tournaments: PGA Championship (1958)
- Website: www.llanerchcc.org
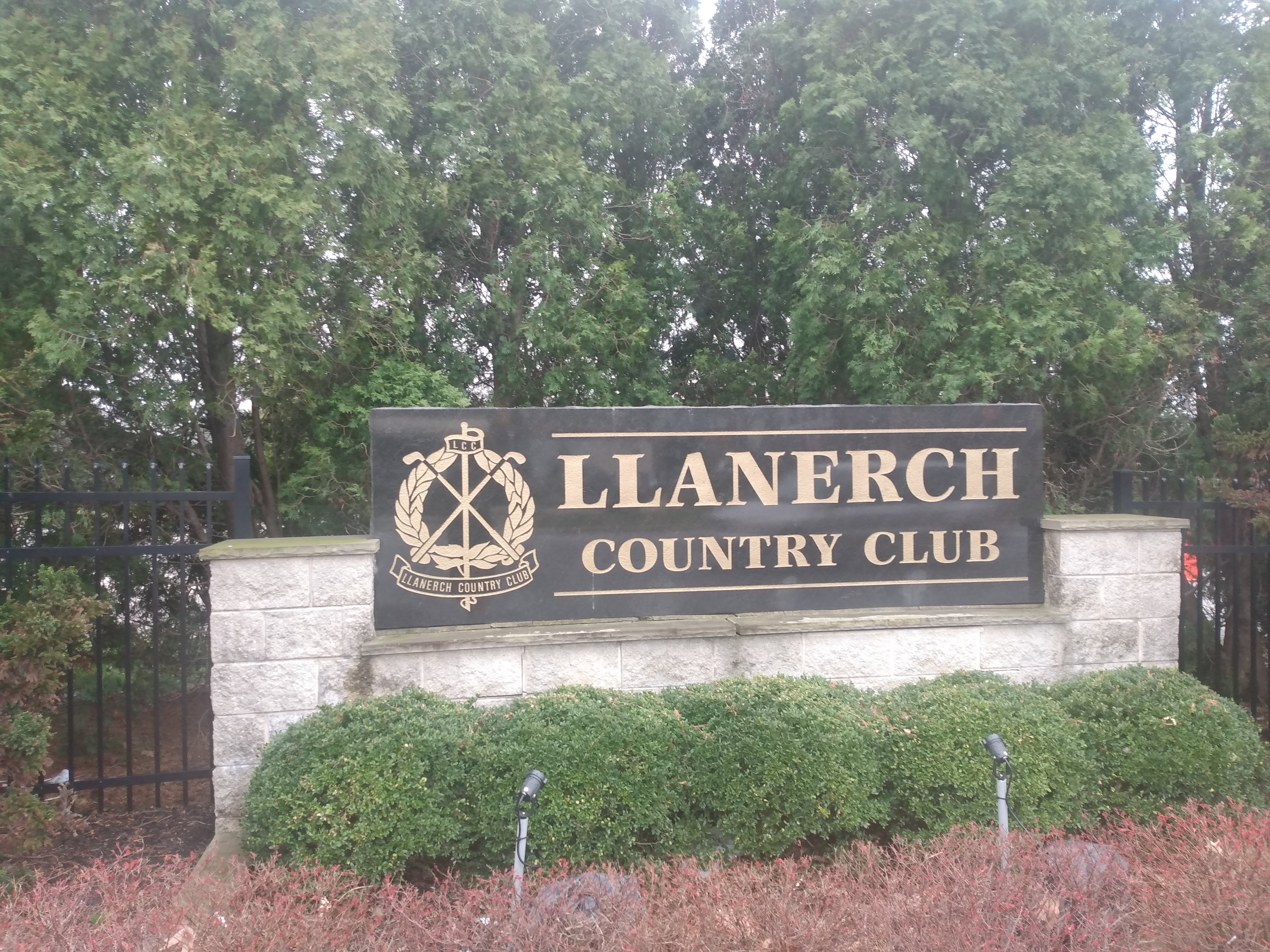

The Llanerch Country Club is a private club in Haverford Township, Delaware County, Pennsylvania, USA (postal address Havertown, Pennsylvania).

The Llanerch Country Club has been operating under its present name since 1919 and under other names since 1901. It has hosted numerous championships, including the first PGA Championship to be conducted in its modern stroke play format, won by Dow Finsterwald in 1958. World Golf Hall of Fame member Denny Shute was the head pro there from 1933 until 1936 when he resigned to become a full-time touring pro.

== Scorecard ==
Llanerch Country Club
Tee	Rating/Slope	1	2	3	4	5	6	7	8	9	Out	10	11	12	13	14	15	16	17	18	In	Total
Blue	73.7 / 140	403	432	467	205	556	416	393	221	492	3585	438	457	176	361	456	321	540	150	296	3195	6780
White	71.3 / 136	376	401	411	196	524	391	383	203	471	3356	415	406	157	333	446	313	482	144	291	2987	6343
Yellow	68.9 / 128	344	373	386	178	490	365	368	181	421	3106	397	381	129	304	402	301	447	126	247	2734	5840
Red	73.6 / 131	341	372	381	173	475	349	359	168	417	3035	393	376	126	297	395	295	404	108	247	2641	5676
Par		4	4	4	3	5	4	4	3	5	36	4	4	3	4	4	4	5	3	4	35/37	71/73
SI	Men's	9	1	5	13	15	3	7	11	17		2	6	14	18	4	12	8	10	16
SI	Women's	11	7	15	13	3	9	1	17	5		10	12	18	8	4	6	2	16	14
