= Jacobsen Manufacturing =

Defunct lawn maintenance equipment company

- Type: Subsidiary
- Traded as: NYSE:TXT
- Industry: Lawnmower Manufacturing
- Predecessor: Thor Machine Works
- Founded: c. 1921 Racine, Wisconsin, U.S.
- Founder: Knud Jacobsen
- Fate: Acquired by Textron, 1975
- Headquarters: Ipswich, UK, England
- Products: Tractors, lawnmowers

Jacobsen Manufacturing is a former U.S. lawn mower and light-duty tractor manufacturer operating from the early 1920s until around 2020. It was located in Racine, Wisconsin, from 1921 to 2001, then moving to Charlotte, North Carolina. In 2017, the company moved from Charlotte to Augusta, Georgia. In 2020, it relocated fully to its sister factory of Ransomes-Jacobsen in Ipswich, England. It has been owned by Textron since 1975.

== History ==
Jacobsen Manufacturing was founded around the turn of the 20th century as a pattern-making shop by Knud Jacobsen, a Danish immigrant who came to Racine, Wisconsin, in 1891. A skilled woodworker, Jacobsen made patterns for automobiles, agricultural machines and electrical equipment. Jacobsen restructured his business as Thor Machine Works in 1917. In 1921 it released the 4-Acre mower, a gasoline-powered reel mower marketed through Jacobsen Manufacturing. Not long after the Greens Mower was released. In 1928 Jacobsen made a notable contribution to small engines by inventing the recoil start, by 1932 all Jacobsen mowers used recoil starters. The company continued to produce mowers for estates and golf courses throughout the 1920s and 1930s, and was not damaged by the Great Depression. Knud Jacobsen retired in 1939 and was succeeded as president by his son, Oscar Jacobsen.

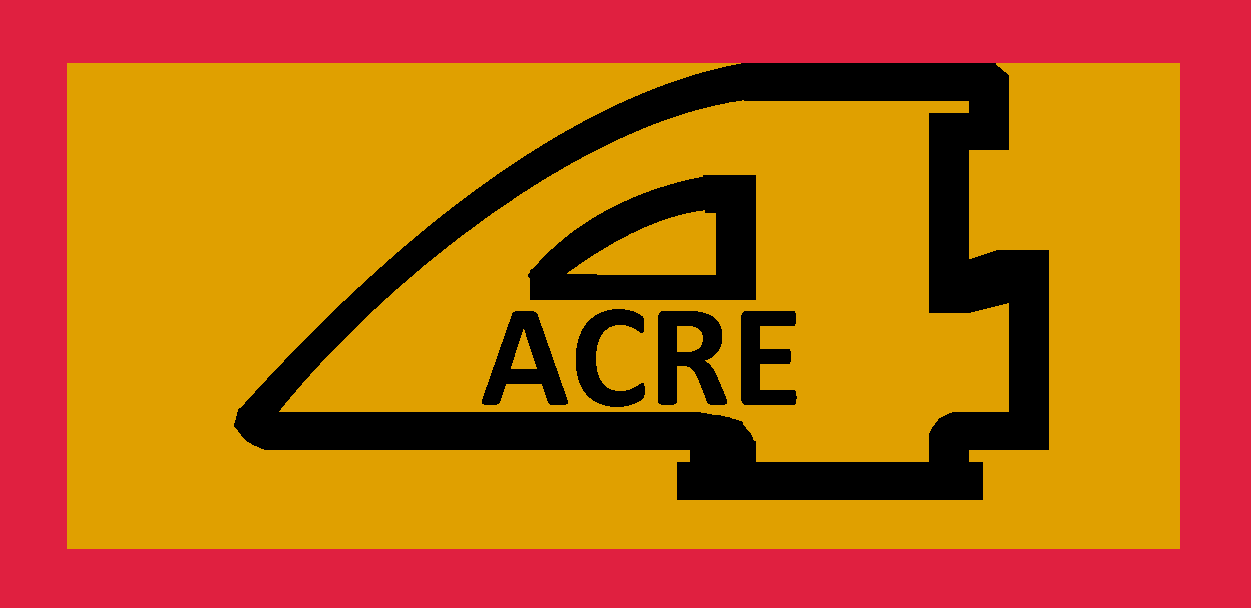
Logo used for the Jacobsen 4-Acre mower

In 1945 Jacobsen Manufacturing purchased the Worthington Mower Company of East Stroudsburg, Pennsylvania, known for its gang mowers for golf courses, parks and airfields. In 1949 the new subsidiary began making Model G tractors using Ford tractor components, mostly for use in parks and golf courses. The company introduced new products, such as a tractor-mounted compressor in 1955. It continued to make lawnmowers in Stroudsburg for golf course maintenance and for residential use until it closed around 1959. Jacobsen manufactured under the Worthington brand until the mid-1960s.

The company had purchased the Johnston Lawn Mower Company of Ottumwa, Iowa, and used this division to enter the residential mower market, offering reel-type and rotary-type mowers for this market in the 1950s. The Javelin riding mower came out at the end of the 1950s, and the Jacobsen Chief garden tractor was launched in 1961 with the 100A which was electric start with 7 hp Kohler K161 and the 100B which was rope start with 7 hp Kohler K161. In 1965 Ford entered the garden tractor market with their two models, T-800 powered by an 8 hp Kohler K181 and the T-1000 powered by a 10 hp Kohler K241. In 1966, Jacobsen Chief Tractors started using a Peerless 2300 and steering was improved as well as a style change. Jacobsen made tractors for Oliver, Ford, Minneapolis-Moline, and White. Jacobsen also made light tractors aimed at the farm market, with innovative attachments to make the tractors more useful and to make them qualify for tax breaks. Textron purchased Jacobsen in 1975, and still produces Jacobsen garden tractors and mowers today at their factory in Ipswich, UK.
