= Smithfield Township, Monroe County, Pennsylvania =

Township in Pennsylvania, US

Smithfield Township
- Township
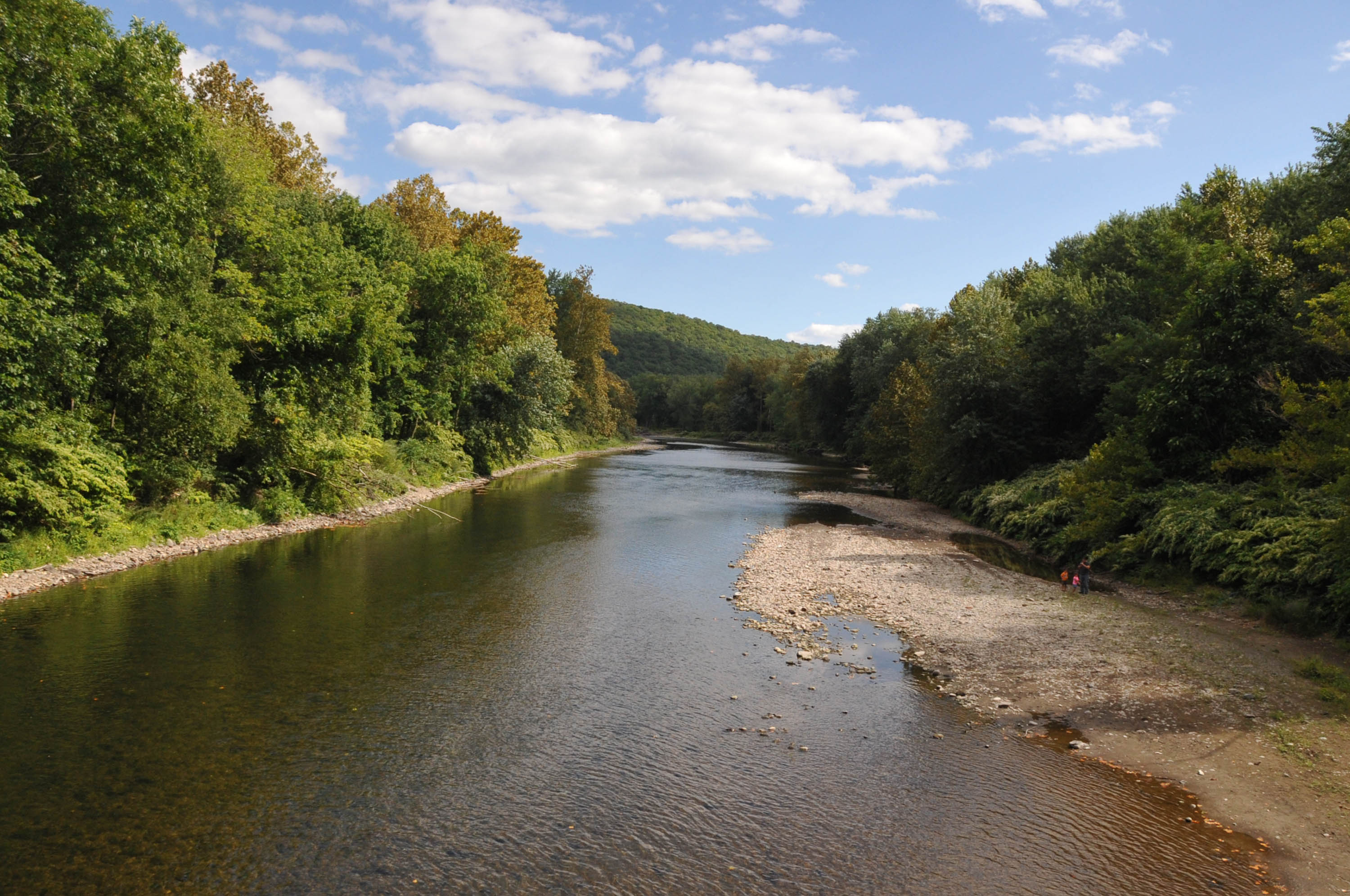
- Shawnee-Minisink Site in Smithfield Township

- Seal

- Location of Pennsylvania in the United States
- Coordinates: 41°02′00″N 75°06′59″W
- Country: United States
- State: Pennsylvania
- County: Monroe

Area
  - Total: 23.59 sq mi (61.10 km^{2})
  - Land: 22.94 sq mi (59.41 km^{2})
  - Water: 0.65 sq mi (1.69 km^{2})
- Elevation: 840 ft (260 m)

Population (2020)
  - Total: 8,001 ▲
  - Estimate (2021): 8,042
  - Density: 318.9/sq mi (123.12/km^{2})
- Time zone: UTC-5 (EST)
  - Summer (DST): UTC-4 (EDT)
- Area code: 570
- FIPS code: 42-089-71344
- Website: smithfieldtownship.com

Smithfield Township is a township in Monroe County, Pennsylvania, United States. The population was 8,001 at the 2020 census.

== History ==
"In 1746, the first action was taken for the formation of Smithfield Township, the first municipal division north of the Blue Mountains. The petition contained the names of twenty-seven landholders." The township comprised all the settlements above the mountains. Originally in Bucks County, Smithfield Township was erected in 1748. "In 1752, when Northampton County was set off from Bucks County, it comprised all of Smithfield which included what is now Lehigh, Carbon, Monroe, Pike and Wayne" Counties.

The Shawnee-Minisink Site was listed on the National Register of Historic Places in 2007. Worthington Hall was listed in 1978 and delisted in 1986 after being demolished.

== Geography ==
According to the United States Census Bureau, the township has a total area of 23.9 square miles (61.8 km^{2}), of which 23.2 square miles (60.0 km^{2}) is land and 0.7 square mile (1.8 km^{2}) (2.93%) is water.

== Demographics ==
Historical population
| Census | Pop. | Note | %± |
|---|---|---|---|
| 2000 | 5,672 | | — |
| 2010 | 7,357 | | 29.7% |
| 2020 | 8,001 | | 8.8% |
| 2021 (est.) | 8,042 | | 0.5% |
U.S. Decennial Census

As of the census of 2000, there were 5,672 people, 2,084 households, and 1,535 families residing in the township. The population density was 244.7 inhabitants per square mile (94.5/km^{2}). There were 3,028 housing units at an average density of 130.6 per square mile (50.4/km^{2}). The racial makeup of the township was 87.78% White, 5.62% African American, 0.44% Native American, 0.95% Asian, 0.02% Pacific Islander, 3.00% from other races, and 2.19% from two or more races. Hispanic or Latino of any race were 7.39% of the population.

There were 2,084 households, out of which 34.5% had children under the age of 18 living with them, 60.8% were married couples living together, 9.0% had a female householder with no husband present, and 26.3% were non-families. 20.2% of all households were made up of individuals, and 7.0% had someone living alone who was 65 years of age or older. The average household size was 2.66 and the average family size was 3.07.

In the township the population was spread out, with 26.1% under the age of 18, 7.9% from 18 to 24, 28.3% from 25 to 44, 24.9% from 45 to 64, and 12.7% who were 65 years of age or older. The median age was 38 years. For every 100 females, there were 99.7 males. For every 100 females age 18 and over, there were 95.9 males.

The median income for a household in the township was $51,607, and the median income for a family was $57,526. Males had a median income of $40,863 versus $28,772 for females. The per capita income for the township was $23,627. About 5.2% of families and 9.0% of the population were below the poverty line, including 7.7% of those under age 18 and 7.7% of those age 65 or over.

United States presidential election results for Smithfield Township, Monroe County, Pennsylvania
| Year | Republican | | Democratic | | Third party(ies) | |
| Year | No. | % | No. | % | No. | % |
|---|---|---|---|---|---|---|
| 2024 | 1,790 | 44.12% | 2,221 | 54.74% | 46 | 1.13% |
| 2020 | 1,574 | 40.57% | 2,274 | 58.61% | 32 | 0.82% |
| 2016 | 1,354 | 40.77% | 1,876 | 56.49% | 91 | 2.74% |
| 2012 | 1,154 | 40.31% | 1,675 | 58.51% | 34 | 1.19% |
| 2008 | 1,152 | 37.11% | 1,920 | 61.86% | 32 | 1.03% |
| 2004 | 1,223 | 46.22% | 1,407 | 53.17% | 16 | 0.60% |
| 2000 | 967 | 46.85% | 1,023 | 49.56% | 74 | 3.59% |

== Climate ==
According to the Trewartha climate classification system, Smithfield Township has a Temperate Continental climate (Dc) with warm summers (b), cold winters (o) and year-around precipitation (Dcbo). Dcbo climates are characterized by at least one month having an average mean temperature ≤ 32.0 °F (0.0 °C), four to seven months with an average mean temperature ≥ 50.0 °F (10.0 °C), all months with an average mean temperature < 72.0 °F (22.2 °C) and no significant precipitation difference between seasons. Although most summer days are slightly humid in Smithfield Township, episodes of heat and high humidity can occur with heat index values > 101 °F (38 °C). Since 1981, the highest air temperature was 100.0 °F (37.8 °C) on July 22, 2011, and the highest daily average mean dew point was 72.6 °F (22.6 °C) on August 1, 2006. July is the peak month for thunderstorm activity, which correlates with the average warmest month of the year. The average wettest month is September, which correlates with tropical storm remnants during the peak of the Atlantic hurricane season. Since 1981, the wettest calendar day was 6.27 inches (159 mm) on October 8, 2005. During the winter months, the plant hardiness zone is 6a, with an average annual extreme minimum air temperature of −5.8 °F (−21.0 °C). Since 1981, the coldest air temperature was −18.4 °F (−28.0 °C) on January 21, 1994. Episodes of extreme cold and wind can occur with wind chill values < −17 °F (−27 °C). The average snowiest month is January, which correlates with the average coldest month of the year. Ice storms and large snowstorms depositing ≥ 12 inches (30 cm) of snow occur once every couple of years, particularly during nor’easters from December through March.

Climate data for Smithfield Twp, Elevation 620 ft (189 m), 1981-2010 normals, extremes 1981-2018
| Month | Jan | Feb | Mar | Apr | May | Jun | Jul | Aug | Sep | Oct | Nov | Dec | Year |
|---|---|---|---|---|---|---|---|---|---|---|---|---|---|
| Record high °F (°C) | 68.4 (20.2) | 76.7 (24.8) | 86.0 (30.0) | 94.2 (34.6) | 94.5 (34.7) | 95.2 (35.1) | 100.0 (37.8) | 98.5 (36.9) | 96.2 (35.7) | 87.9 (31.1) | 79.2 (26.2) | 71.0 (21.7) | 100.0 (37.8) |
| Mean daily maximum °F (°C) | 35.6 (2.0) | 39.4 (4.1) | 48.4 (9.1) | 61.1 (16.2) | 71.5 (21.9) | 79.5 (26.4) | 83.3 (28.5) | 81.9 (27.7) | 74.7 (23.7) | 63.2 (17.3) | 51.9 (11.1) | 40.0 (4.4) | 61.0 (16.1) |
| Daily mean °F (°C) | 26.4 (−3.1) | 29.4 (−1.4) | 37.4 (3.0) | 48.7 (9.3) | 58.8 (14.9) | 67.5 (19.7) | 71.8 (22.1) | 70.4 (21.3) | 63.1 (17.3) | 51.5 (10.8) | 41.8 (5.4) | 31.4 (−0.3) | 49.9 (9.9) |
| Mean daily minimum °F (°C) | 17.2 (−8.2) | 19.4 (−7.0) | 26.4 (−3.1) | 36.3 (2.4) | 46.1 (7.8) | 55.5 (13.1) | 60.3 (15.7) | 59.0 (15.0) | 51.4 (10.8) | 39.7 (4.3) | 31.7 (−0.2) | 22.8 (−5.1) | 38.9 (3.8) |
| Record low °F (°C) | −18.4 (−28.0) | −9.0 (−22.8) | −0.7 (−18.2) | 14.1 (−9.9) | 27.4 (−2.6) | 36.3 (2.4) | 42.5 (5.8) | 37.9 (3.3) | 29.9 (−1.2) | 19.7 (−6.8) | 5.6 (−14.7) | −7.4 (−21.9) | −18.4 (−28.0) |
| Average precipitation inches (mm) | 3.38 (86) | 2.96 (75) | 3.63 (92) | 4.10 (104) | 4.42 (112) | 4.47 (114) | 4.49 (114) | 4.38 (111) | 4.94 (125) | 4.75 (121) | 4.00 (102) | 4.07 (103) | 49.59 (1,260) |
| Average snowfall inches (cm) | 12.3 (31) | 8.9 (23) | 9.2 (23) | 2.2 (5.6) | 0.0 (0.0) | 0.0 (0.0) | 0.0 (0.0) | 0.0 (0.0) | 0.0 (0.0) | 0.1 (0.25) | 2.3 (5.8) | 7.4 (19) | 42.4 (108) |
| Average relative humidity (%) | 69.3 | 64.2 | 59.6 | 57.1 | 61.5 | 68.6 | 68.8 | 71.6 | 72.5 | 70.4 | 69.3 | 70.5 | 67.0 |
| Average dew point °F (°C) | 17.7 (−7.9) | 18.8 (−7.3) | 24.6 (−4.1) | 34.2 (1.2) | 45.6 (7.6) | 56.8 (13.8) | 61.0 (16.1) | 60.8 (16.0) | 54.1 (12.3) | 42.2 (5.7) | 32.5 (0.3) | 22.9 (−5.1) | 39.4 (4.1) |
Source: PRISM

== Transportation ==
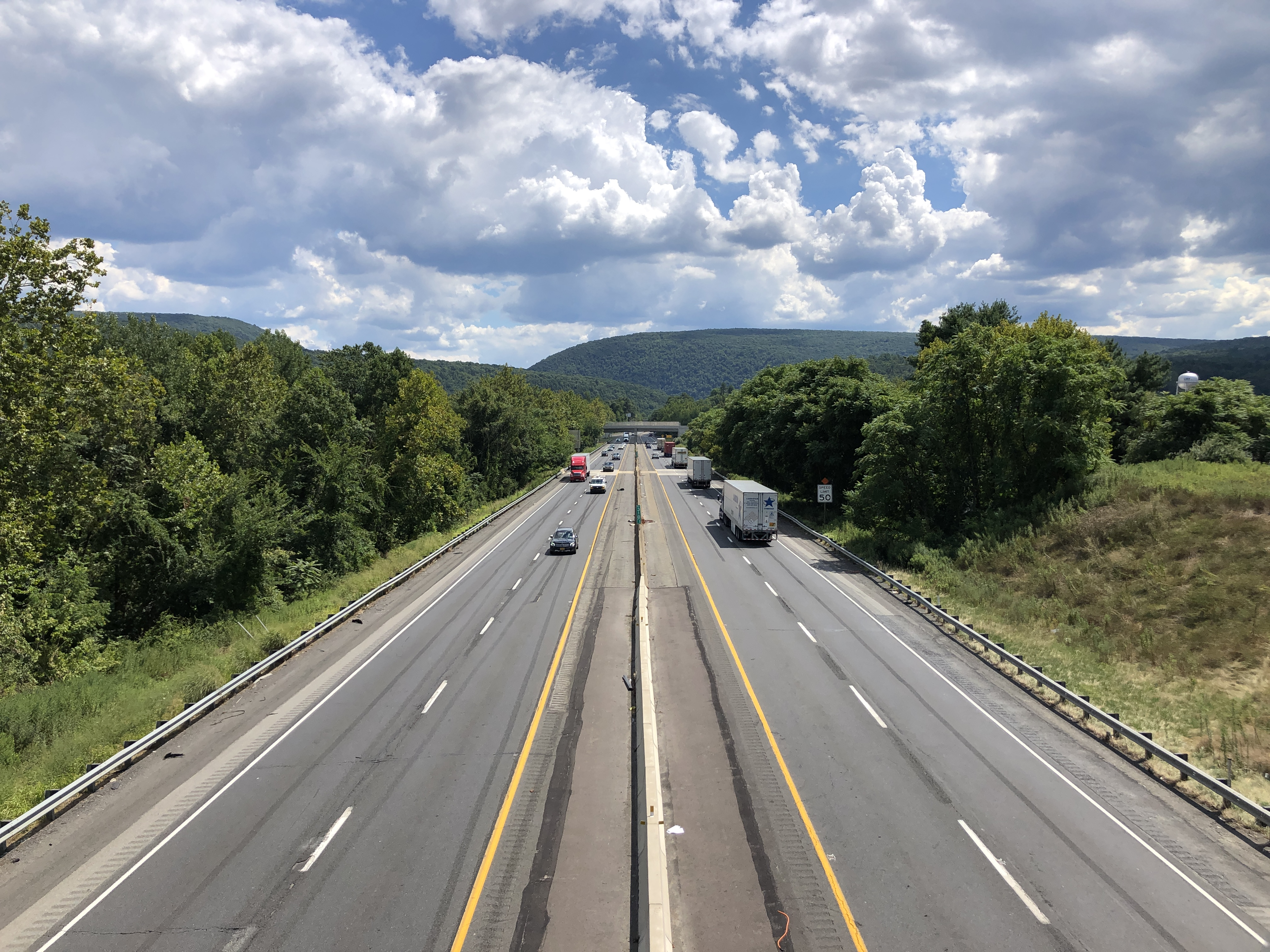
I-80 eastbound in Smithfield Township

As of 2019, there were 72.60 miles (116.84 km) of public roads in Smithfield Township, of which 18.57 miles (29.89 km) were maintained by the Pennsylvania Department of Transportation (PennDOT) and 54.03 miles (86.95 km) were maintained by the township.

Interstate 80 is the most prominent highway serving Smithfield Township. It follows the Keystone Shortway along an east–west alignment through the southwestern portion of the township. U.S. Route 209 enters the township concurrently with I-80, then turns northeastward and follows Seven Bridge Road, Marshalls Creek Bypass and Milford Road through the heart of the township. U.S. Route 209 Business begins at US 209 near the northeastern edge of the township and follows Milford Road southwestward across the northwestern portion of the township. Pennsylvania Route 402 begins at US 209 Business and heads northward across the northeastern portion of the township. Finally, Pennsylvania Route 447 begins at US 209 and heads northwestward along Independence Road across the western portion of the township.

== Ecology ==
According to the A. W. Kuchler U.S. potential natural vegetation types, Smithfield Township would have a dominant vegetation type of Appalachian Oak (104) with a dominant vegetation form of Eastern Hardwood Forest (25). The peak spring bloom typically occurs in late-April and peak fall color usually occurs in mid-October. The plant hardiness zone is 6a with an average annual extreme minimum air temperature of −5.8 °F (−21.0 °C).

== See also ==
- Mountain Lake House
