= The Shawnee Inn & Golf Resort =

Resort in Shawnee on Delaware, Pennsylvania, U.S.

Coordinates: 40°59′56″N 75°07′32″W

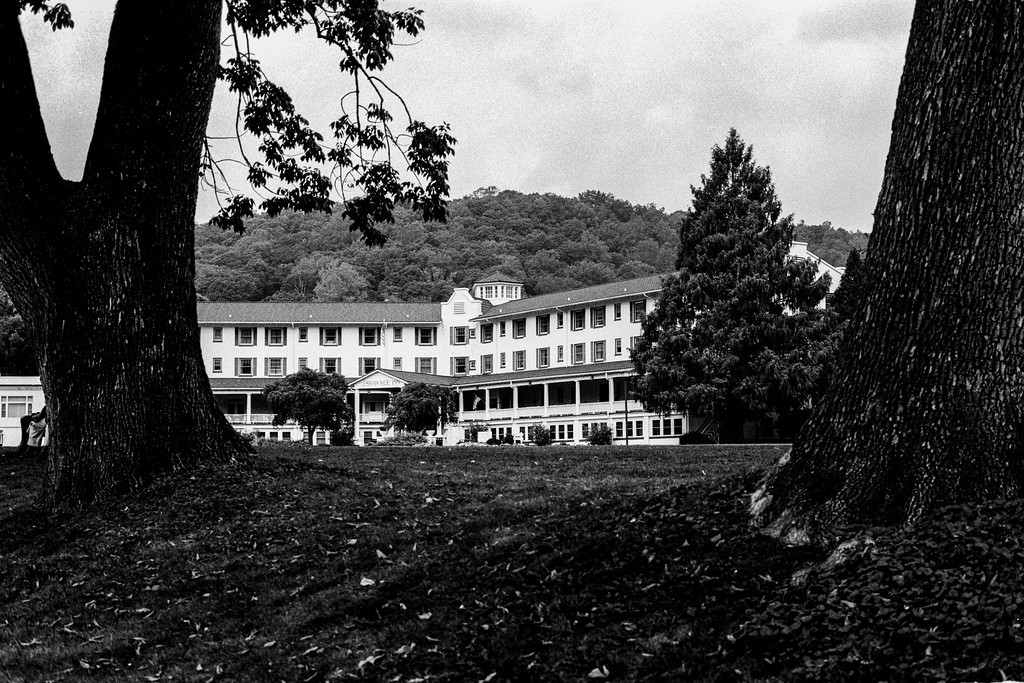
The Shawnee Inn

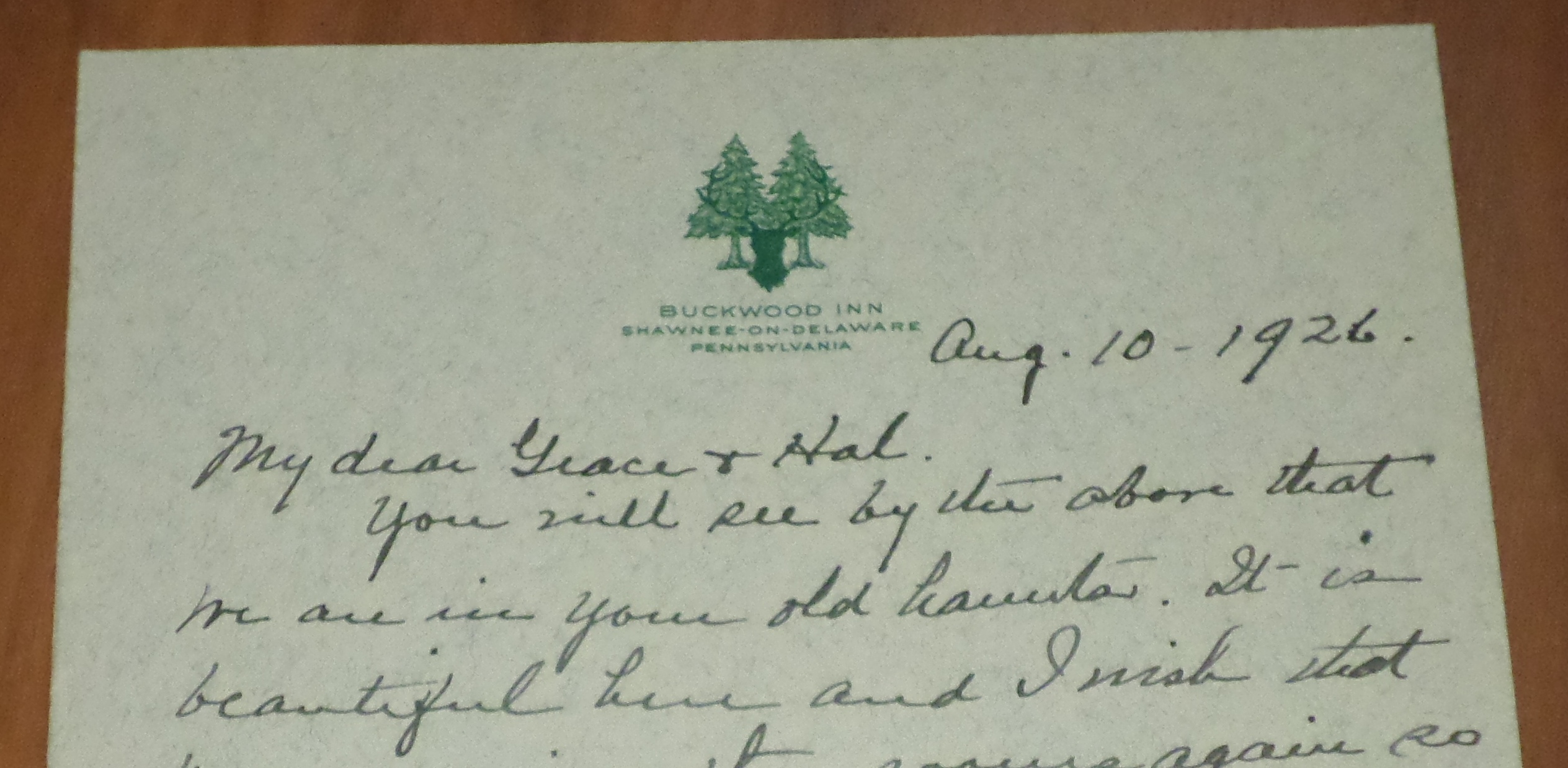
1926 letter on Buckwood Inn stationery

Location in the United States

The Shawnee Inn & Golf Resort is a resort in the village of Shawnee on Delaware, located in the foothills of the Pocono Mountains in Northeastern Pennsylvania. The hotel is a Spanish colonial revival building with white-Moorish architecture and Spanish tiled roofs. Mike Jesky of the Standard-Speaker wrote, “The three-story, 96-room inn looms large and flat on the grounds, with a stately yet inviting appearance.” In the 1990s the Shawnee Inn was identified as the only resort on the banks of the Delaware River. Tee Time magazine has ranked the golf course there as one of the finest in the Mid-Atlantic region.

== History ==
The hotel opened on June 5, 1911, as the Buckwood Inn and was built by Charles Campbell Worthington, formerly head of the Worthington Pump and Machinery Corporation. It was constructed out of concrete, considered unusual for the time, and some of the walls were a foot thick. Author Lawrence Squeri wrote, “Although the Buckwood Inn was adjacent to the Delaware River, only a few steps from the water, its management realized that guests preferred a swimming pool to river bathing.”

The golf course at the Buckwood Inn was the first to be designed by A. W. Tillinghast, a renowned golf course architect. In 1919 the resort was a host site for a U.S. Women's Amateur won by Alexa Stirling. John D. Rockefeller stopped over to play golf at the Buckwood Inn in 1920. Worthington hired “a Scotsman with a flock of sheep and dogs” to keep the fairways trim, but the efforts were not successful. He then designed the gang mower to maintain the golf course, and this led to the establishment of the Shawnee Mower Factory, which sold gang mowers all over the United States.

The annual Shawnee Open attracted well-known golfers such as Harry Vardon, Ted Ray, Freddie McLeod, and Alex Smith. At the 1913 tournament, Worthington sent a letter to participants suggesting that they get together and organize. The Buckwood Inn hosted the PGA Championship in 1938, and an excerpt from the program stated, “It was the thought expressed in that letter that gave the boys the idea of forming a professional association." Paul Runyan defeated resident pro Sam Snead 8 and 7 in the title match.

In 1943 bandleader Fred Waring purchased the resort, renamed it the Shawnee Inn, and broadcast his radio shows from the Shawnee Playhouse, a half-mile down the road. Jackie Gleason took up golf there in 1944, while Art Carney, Lucille Ball, Ed Sullivan and Perry Como would make regular appearances at the resort. Arnold Palmer met his wife Winnie at the Shawnee Inn when she was working at the clubhouse in 1954."

In 1964 the golf course was expanded from eighteen to twenty-seven holes, with nine new holes designed by Bill Diddle. Jason Scott Deegan of Golf Advisor wrote, “Where Tillinghast holes begin and where Diddle ends can be confusing, but they mesh well, nonetheless.” Twenty-four of the holes are on a private island in the Delaware River. Jesky wrote, “Several of the holes involve hitting across the Delaware River, and a 284-foot-long foot bridge helps golfers get there.”

In 1967 Hale Irwin won the NCAA Championship for the University of Colorado at the Shawnee Inn golf course.

In 1972 the resort merged with the American Landmark Corp. of Stroudsburg under developer Karl Hope. In 1974 he established the Shawnee Village, the first timeshare development in Pennsylvania. The Shawnee Inn began to offer skiing in 1975, and ski champion Jean-Claude Killy was hired to lead the new operation.

Bethlehem native Charles Kirkwood purchased the Shawnee Inn in 1977. The nine-hole, par-3 Tillinghast Approach Course, designed by Tom Doak, opened at the resort in 2006.
