= LXXXX Corps =

LXXXX Corps, XC Corps, or 90th Corps may refer to:

- LXXXX Army Corps, Wehrmacht, Germany
- 90th (Whitevale) Lanarkshire Rifle Volunteer Corps, United Kingdom

== See also ==
- List of military corps by number
- 90th Brigade (disambiguation)
- 90th Division (disambiguation)
- 90th Regiment (disambiguation)
- 90th (disambiguation)
