= 90th =

90th is the ordinal form of the number 90. 90th or Ninetieth may also refer to:

- A fraction, 1/90, equal to one of 90 equal parts

== Geography ==
- 90th meridian east, a line of longitude
- 90th meridian west, a line of longitude
- 90th parallel north, a circle of latitude
- 90th parallel south, a circle of latitude
- 90th Street (disambiguation)

== Military ==
- 90th Brigade (disambiguation)
- 90th Division (disambiguation)
- 90th Regiment (disambiguation)
- 90th Squadron (disambiguation)

== Other ==
- 90th century
- 90th century BC

== See also ==
- 90 (disambiguation)
- March 31, 90th day of the year in a standard year
