= 90 =

90 may refer to:

- 90 (number), the natural number following 89 and preceding 91
- one of the years 90 BC, AD 90, 1990, 2090, etc.
- The international calling code for Turkey
- 90 (album), an album by British electronic group 808 State
- 90 (EP), an album by Korean rock band South Club
- Atomic number 90: thorium
- 90 Antiope, a double asteroid

== Vehicles ==
- Audi 90, a compact executive car
- Saab 90, a compact executive car
- Sunbeam-Talbot 90, a compact executive car
- Alfa Romeo 90, an executive car
- Tatra 90, a prototype car
- Rover 90, a saloon car

== See also ==
- 90th (disambiguation)
- List of highways numbered 90
