= Tatra 26/30 =

Czech car model made 1926-1933

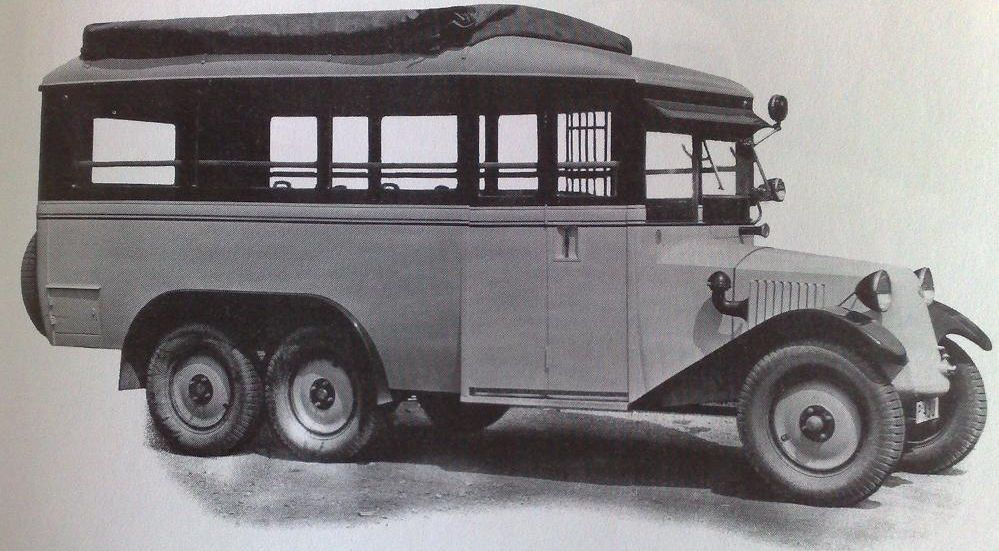
- 1930 Tatra T26/30 bus

Overview
- Manufacturer: Tatra
- Production: 1927-1933
- Designer: Hans Ledwinka

Body and chassis
- Body style: four-door saloon; Truck
- Layout: FR

Powertrain
- Engine: 1057 cc Tatra 12 F2 (26); 1679 cc Tatra 30 F4 (26/30); 1911 cc Tatra 52 F4 (26/52)
- Transmission: four-speed with another auxiliary two

Dimensions
- Wheelbase: 2,900 mm (114.2 in) + 850 mm (33.5 in)
- Length: 5,500 mm (216.5 in)
- Width: 1,800 mm (70.9 in)
- Height: 1,900 mm (74.8 in)

Chronology
- Predecessor: Tatra 13
- Successor: Tatra 72

The Tatra 26/30 is a 6x4 automobile produced by the Czech manufacturer Tatra between 1927 and 1933. Three prototypes were developed on the basis of the T 12 and given the designation T26. However, tests showed that the engine from the T12 did not have enough power. It was replaced with a Tatra 30 engine and the designation of the vehicle was changed to Tatra 26/30.

The 26/30 served in several roles, both in military and in civilian use. These included use as a troop transport, command car, ambulance, and bus.

Four Tatra 26/52 prototypes with the more powerful Tatra 52 engine were produced in 1932 as an intermediary stage between the 26/30 and the Tatra 72, one of which was converted into a fire truck.

== Gallery ==
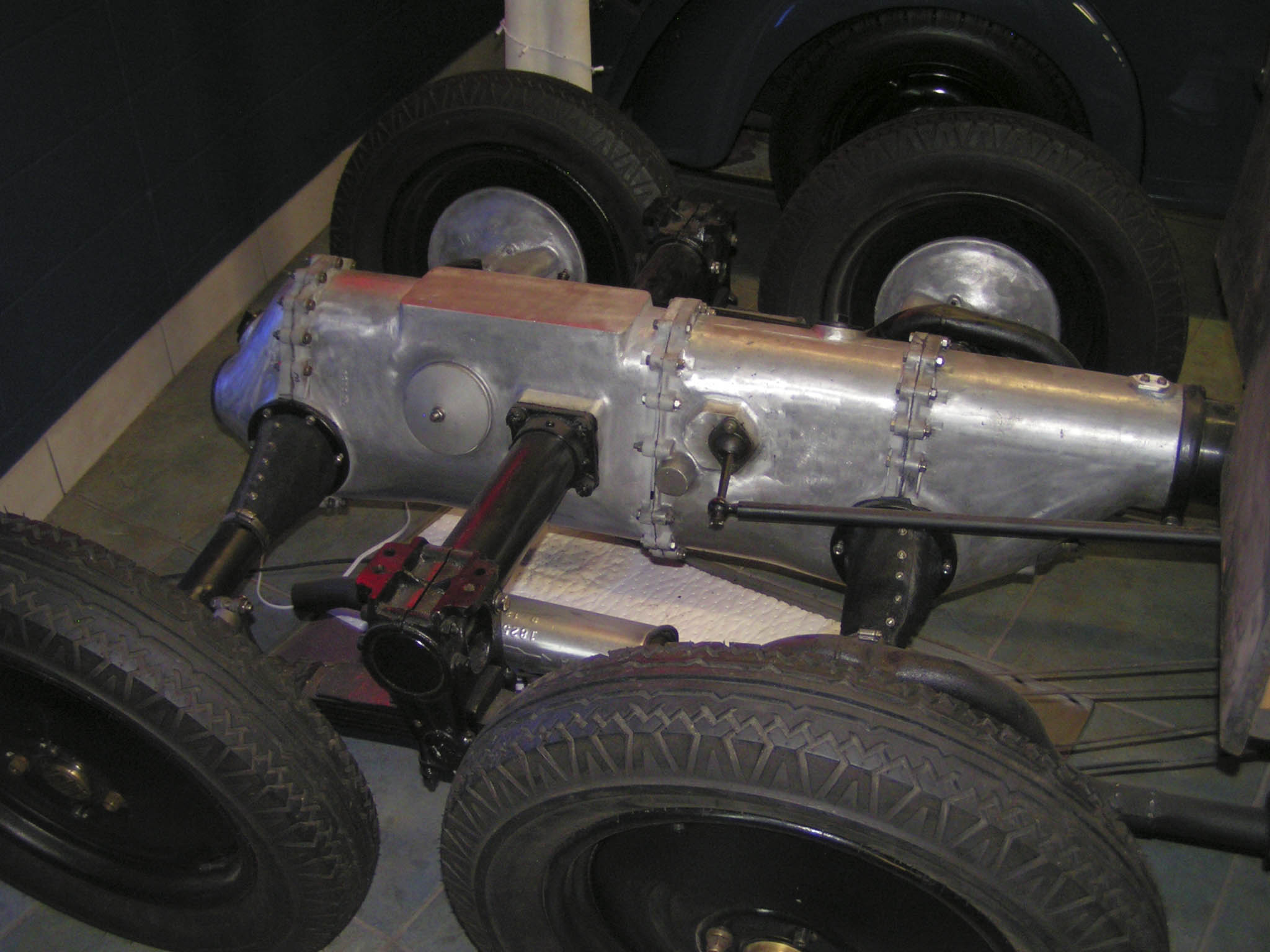
The chassis of the 26/30 truck variant

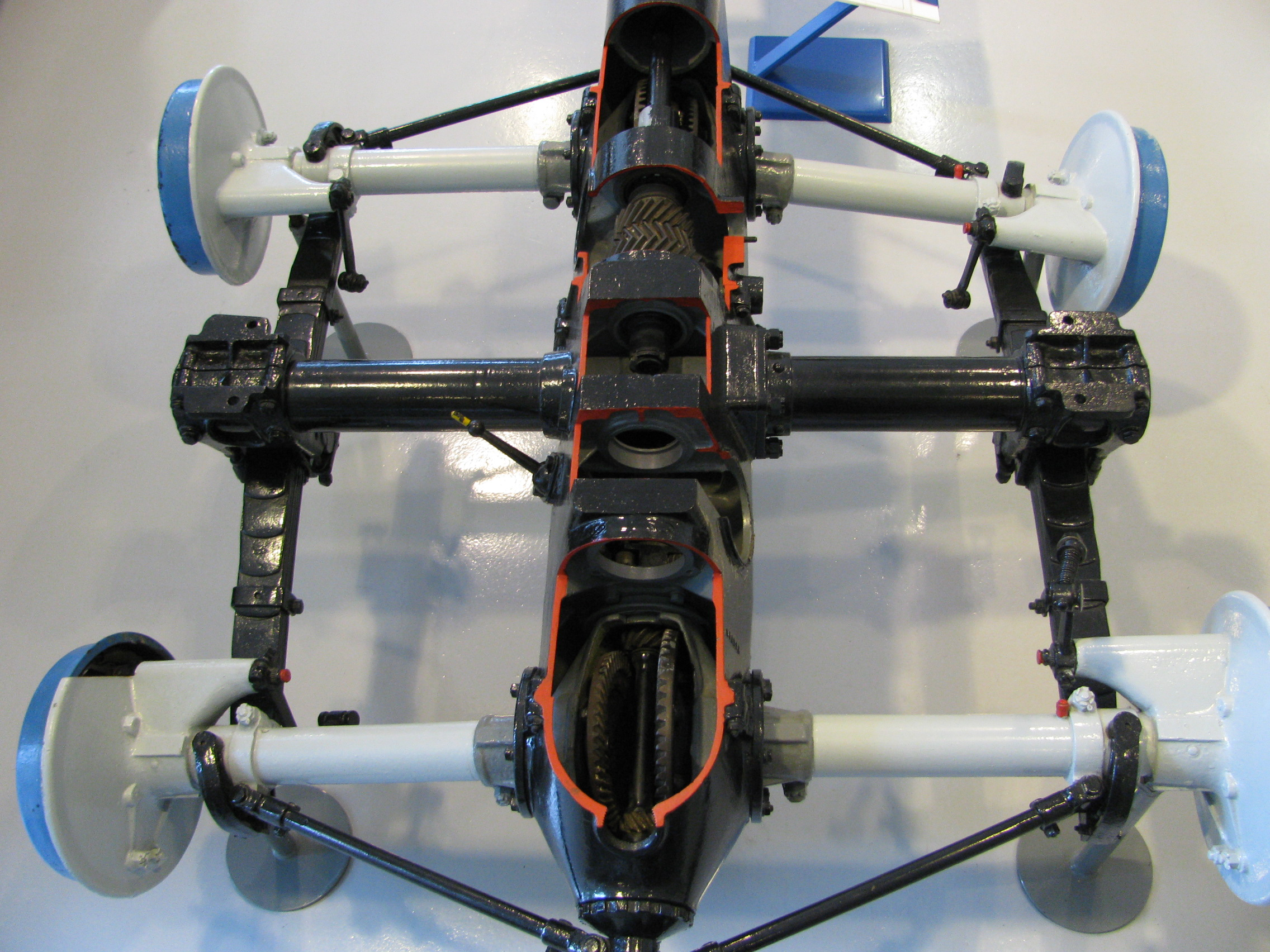
Cut through the rear axles

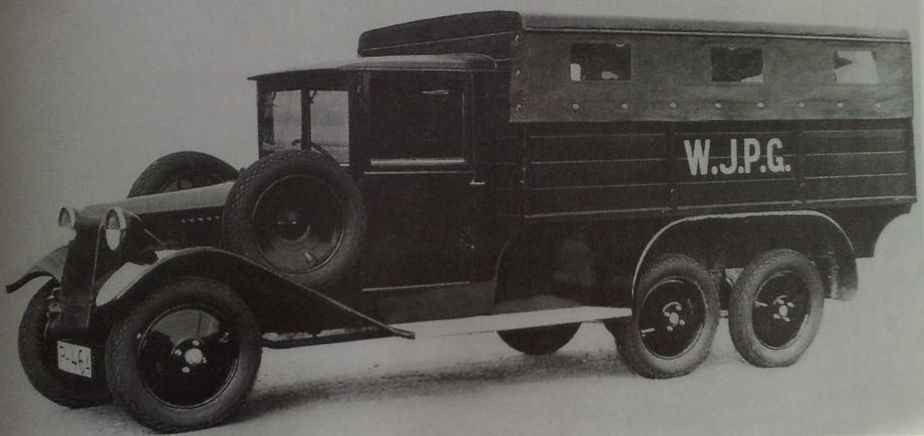
T26/30, light 6×4 truck
