= 90 Squadron =

90 Squadron or 90th Squadron may refer to:

- No. 90 Squadron RAF, a unit of the British Royal Air Force
- 90th Fighter Squadron, a unit of the United States Air Force
- VP-90, a unit of the United States Navy

== See also ==
- 90th Division (disambiguation)
- 90th Regiment (disambiguation)
