= Mechanized infantry =

Units with transport and combat vehicles

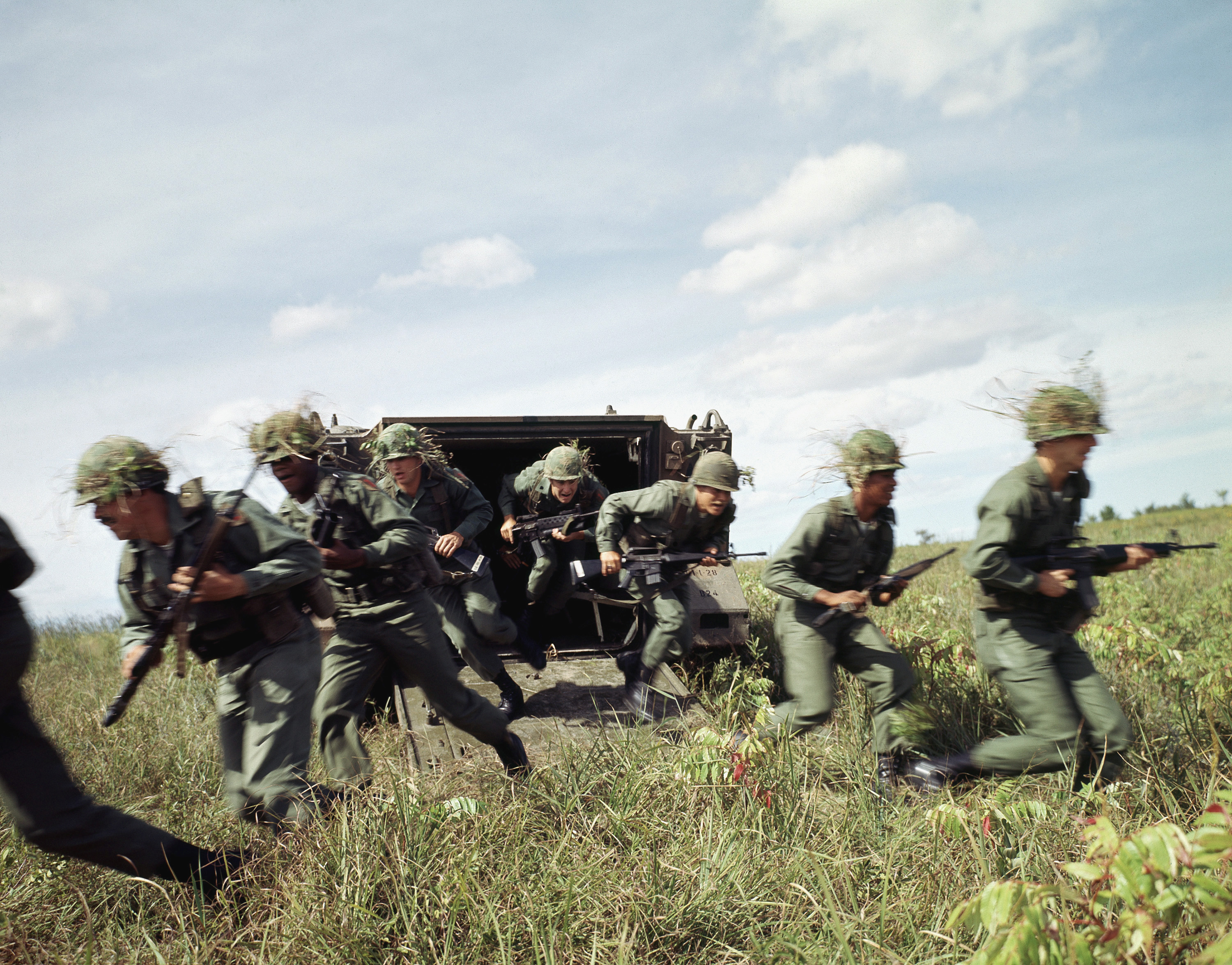
U.S. Army mechanized infantry dismount from an M113 armored personnel carrier during training in 1985.

Mechanized infantry are infantry units equipped with armored personnel carriers (APCs) or infantry fighting vehicles (IFVs) for transport and combat (see also armoured corps).

As defined by the United States Army, mechanized infantry is distinguished from motorized infantry in that its vehicles provide a degree of armor protection and armament for use in combat, whereas motorized infantry are provided with "soft-skinned" wheeled vehicles for transportation only. Most APCs and IFVs are fully tracked or are all-wheel drive vehicles (6×6 or 8×8), for mobility across rough ground. Some militaries distinguish between mechanized and armored (or armoured) infantry, designating troops carried by APCs as mechanized and those in IFVs as armored.

The support weapons for mechanized infantry are also provided with motorized transport, or they are built directly into combat vehicles to keep pace with the mechanized infantry in combat. For units equipped with most types of APC or any type of IFV, fire support weapons, such as machine guns, autocannons, small-bore direct-fire howitzers, and anti-tank guided missiles are often mounted directly on the infantry's own transport vehicles.

Compared with "light" truck-mobile infantry, mechanized infantry can maintain rapid tactical movement and, if mounted in IFVs, have more integral firepower. They require more combat supplies (ammunition and especially fuel) and ordnance supplies (spare vehicle components), and a comparatively larger proportion of manpower is required to crew and maintain the vehicles. For example, most APCs mount a section of seven or eight infantrymen but have a crew of two. Most IFVs carry only six or seven infantry but require a crew of three. To be effective in the field, mechanized units also require many mechanics, with specialized maintenance and recovery vehicles and equipment.

== History ==
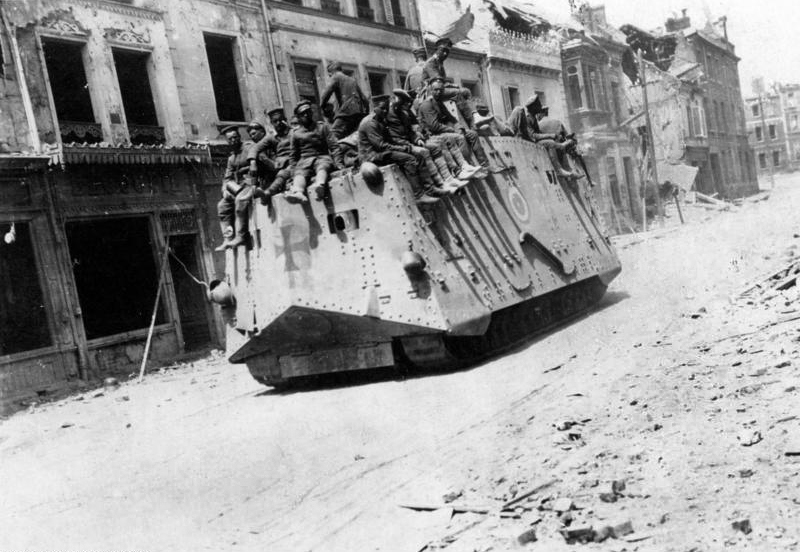
German A7V tanks in Roye, Somme during Operation Michael of World War I in 1918

As early as 1915 the British instigated a tracked vehicle that could carry 50 equipped troops under armour but the project got no further than trials before cancellation. Some of the first mechanized infantry were German assault teams mounted on A7V tanks during World War I. The vehicles were extra-large to let them carry sizeable assault teams and would regularly carry infantry on board in addition to their already large crews that were trained as stormtroopers. All machine-gun-armed A7V tanks carried two small flamethrowers for their dismounts to use. A7V tank would often carry a second officer to lead the assault team.

During the Battle of St. Quentin in late March 1918, A7Vs were accompanied by twenty stormtroopers from Rohr Assault Battalion, but it is unspecified if they were acting as dismounts or were accompanying the tanks on foot. During the battle, tank crews were reported to have dismounted and attacked enemy positions with grenades and flamethrowers on numerous occasions.

Another example is the capture of Villers-Bretonneux, in which A7Vs suppressed the defenders with machine gun fire and assault teams dismounted to attack them with grenades.

The British heavy tank design was given an extended hull to cross wide German trenches. This Mark V** had space for fourteen troops. The Mark IX tank based on the Mark V was designed solely for carrying troops with space for 30 but the war ended before the order was complete and they could be used.

Towards the end of World War I, all the armies involved were faced with the problem of maintaining the momentum of an attack. Tanks, artillery, or infiltration tactics could all be used to break through an enemy defense, but almost all offensives launched in 1918 ground to a halt after a few days. The following infantry quickly became exhausted, and artillery, supplies and fresh formations could not be brought forward over the battlefields quickly enough to maintain the pressure on the regrouping enemy forces.

It was widely acknowledged that cavalry was too vulnerable to be used on most European battlefields, but many armies continued to deploy them. Motorized infantry could maintain rapid movement, but their trucks required either a good road network or firm open terrain, such as desert. They were unable to traverse a battlefield obstructed by craters, barbed wire, and trenches. Tracked or all-wheel drive vehicles were to be the solution.

Following the war, development of mechanized forces was largely theoretical for some time, but many nations began rearming in the 1930s. The British Army had established an Experimental Mechanized Force in 1927, but it failed to pursue that line because of budget constraints and the prior need to garrison the frontiers of the British Empire.

Although some proponents of mobile warfare, such as J. F. C. Fuller, advocated building "tank fleets", other, such as Heinz Guderian in Germany, Adna R. Chaffee Jr. in the United States, and Mikhail Tukhachevsky in the Soviet Union, recognized that tank units required close support from infantry and other arms and that such supporting arms needed to maintain the same pace as the tanks.

As the Germans rearmed in the 1930s, they equipped some infantry units in their new Panzer divisions with the half-track Sd.Kfz. 251, which could keep up with tanks on most terrain. The French Army also created "light mechanized" (légère mécanisée) divisions in which some of the infantry units possessed small tracked carriers. Together with the motorization of the other infantry and support units, this gave both armies highly mobile combined-arms formations. The German doctrine was to use them to exploit breakthroughs in Blitzkrieg offensives, whereas the French envisaged them being used to shift reserves rapidly in a defensive battle.

=== World War II ===
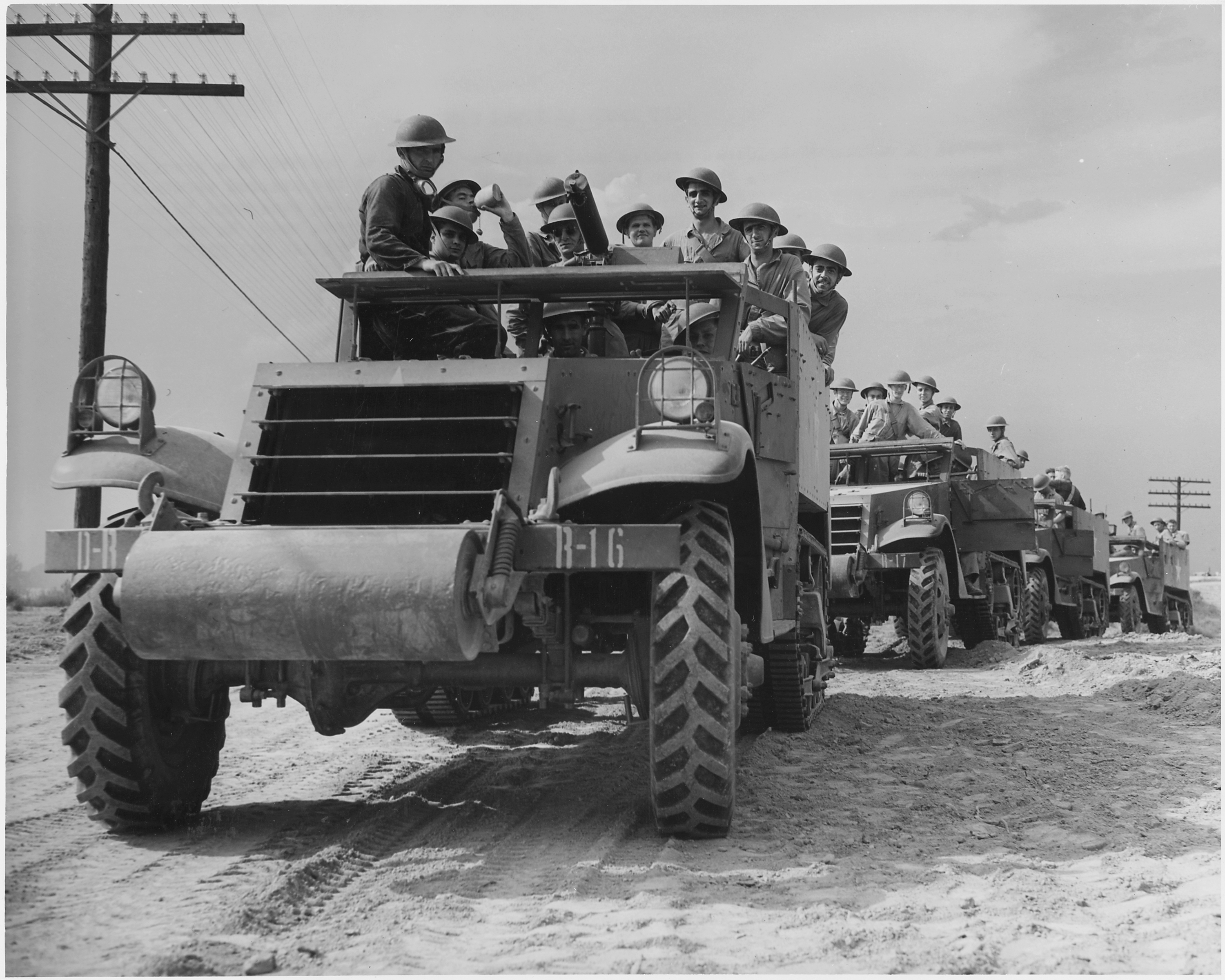
U.S. M3 half-tracks and infantry on exercises, Fort Knox, June 1942

As World War II progressed, most major armies integrated tanks or assault guns with mechanized infantry, as well as other supporting arms, such as artillery and combat engineers, as combined arms units.

Allied armored formations included a mechanized infantry element for combined arms teamwork. For example, US armored divisions had a balance of three battalions each of tanks, armored infantry, and self-propelled artillery. The US armored infantry was fully equipped with M2 and M3 halftracks. In the British and Commonwealth armies, "Type A armoured brigades," intended for independent operations or to form part of armored divisions, had a "motor infantry" battalion mounted in Universal Carriers or later in lend-lease halftracks. "Type B" brigades lacked a motor infantry component and were subordinated to infantry formations.

The Canadian Army and, subsequently the British Army, used expedients such as the Kangaroo APC, usually for specific operations rather than to create permanent mechanized infantry formations. The first such operation was Operation Totalize in the Battle of Normandy, which failed to achieve its ultimate objectives but showed that mechanized infantry could incur far fewer casualties than dismounted troops in set-piece operations.

The German Army, having introduced mechanized infantry in its Panzer divisions, later named them Panzergrenadier units. In the middle of the war, it created entire mechanized infantry divisions and named Panzergrenadier divisions.

Because the German economy could not produce adequate numbers of its half-track APC, barely a quarter or a third of the infantry in Panzer or Panzergrenadier divisions were mechanized, except in a few favored formations. The rest were moved by truck. However, most German reconnaissance units in such formations were also primarily mechanized infantry and could undertake infantry missions when it was needed. The Allies generally used jeeps, armored cars, or light tanks for reconnaissance.

The Red Army began the war while still in the process of reorganizing its armored and mechanized formations, most of which were destroyed during the first months of the German Invasion of the Soviet Union. About a year later, the Soviets recreated division-sized mechanized infantry units, termed mechanized corps, usually with one tank brigade and three mechanized infantry brigades, with motorized supporting arms. They were generally used in the exploitation phase of offensives, as part of the prewar Soviet concept of deep operations.

The Soviet Army also created several cavalry mechanized groups in which tanks, mechanized infantry and horsed cavalry were mixed. They were also used in the exploitation and pursuit phases of offensives. Red Army mechanized infantry were generally carried on tanks or trucks, with only a few dedicated lend-lease half-track APCs.

The New Zealand Army ultimately fielded a division of a roughly similar composition to a Soviet mechanized corps, which fought in the Italian Campaign, but it had little scope for mobile operations until near the end of the war.

The Romanian Army fielded a mixed assortment of vehicles. These amounted to 126 French-designed Renault UE Chenillettes which were licence-built locally, 34 captured and refurbished Soviet armored tractors, 27 German-made armored half-tracks of the Sd.Kfz. 250 and Sd.Kfz. 251 types, over 200 Czechoslovak Tatra, Praga and Skoda trucks (the Tatra trucks were a model which was specifically built for the Romanian Army) as well as 300 German Horch 901 4x4 field cars. Sd.Kfz. 8 and Sd.Kfz. 9 half-tracks were also acquired, as well as nine vehicles of the Sd.Kfz. 10 type and 100 RSO/01 fully tracked tractors. The Romanians also produced five prototypes of an indigenous artillery tractor.

=== Cold War ===
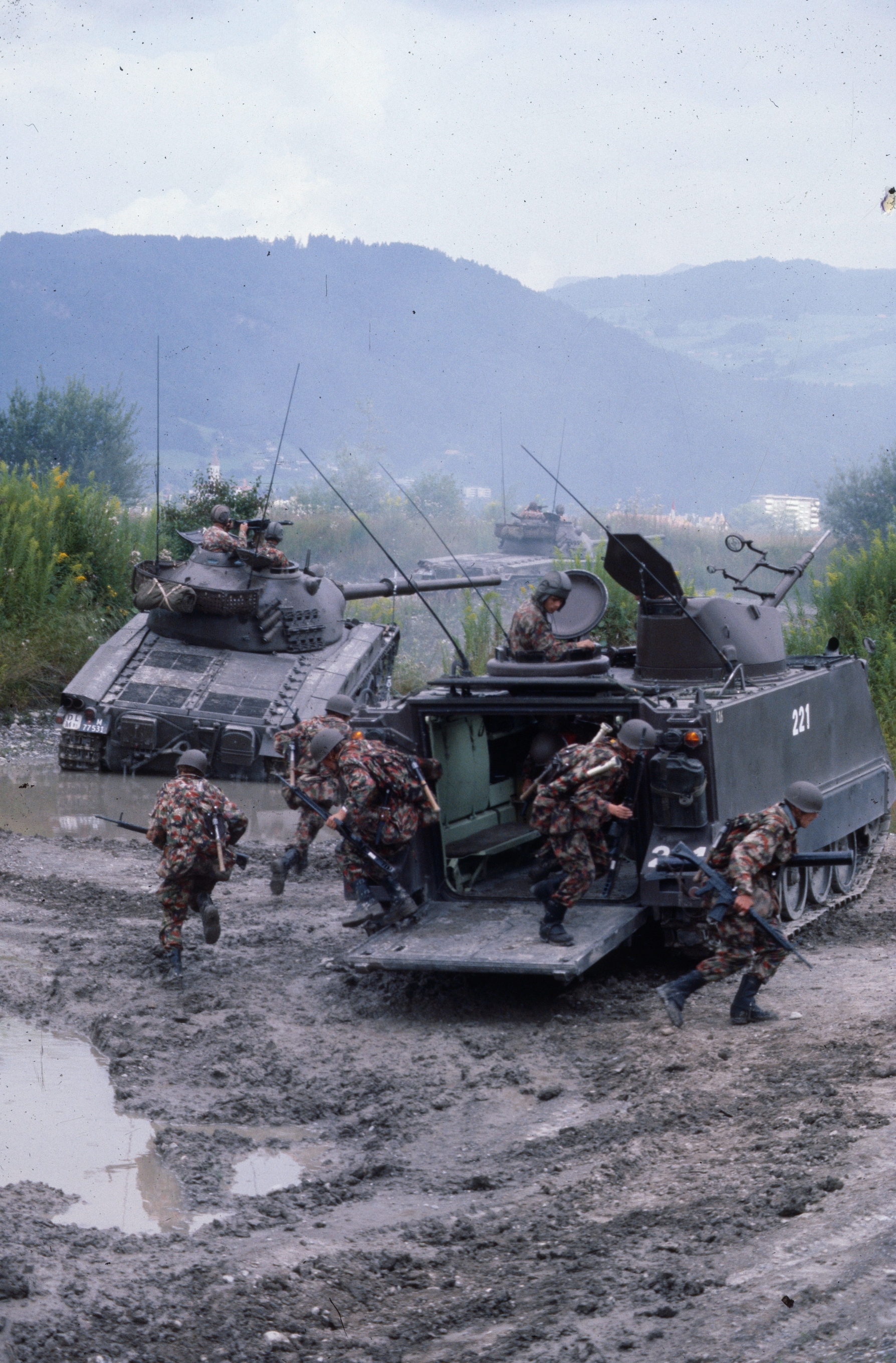
Swiss Armed Forces Panzer 61 and SPz 63/73 armored vehicles deploying mounted infantry in 1979

On July 9, 1945, Decree of the State Defence Committee No. GKO-9488ss, "On the Resupply of Armored and Mechanized Forces of the Red Army" was issued. It ordered the creation of mechanised divisions from many rifle divisions, included in the Armored and Mechanised Troops. In some cases, cavalry divisions and airborne divisions also became mechanised divisions The Soviet motorised rifle troops officially appeared in accordance with the Directive of the Minister of Defense of the USSR No. org. / 3/62540 of February 27, 1957. This directive ordered part of the mechanized divisions and all rifle units and formations reorganized into 'motorised rifle' in the period 1957 to 1964. Creation of the motorised rifle troops was facilitated by large-scale mechanisation of the whole Soviet Ground Forces.

This became possible due to the increase in the production of armored personnel carriers, self-propelled guns and so on. For example, in the period before the formation and in the initial period of the formation of the motorized rifle troops:

- BTR-40 – in the period from 1950 to 1960s, 8,500 units were produced
- BTR-50 — 1954 to 1970s – 6,500 pieces
- BTR-152 — 1947 to 1962 – 12,421 pieces
- BRDM-1 — 1957 to 1966 – 10,000 units

One or two motorised rifle regiments were also present in each tank division, and many tank regiments included one motorised rifle battalion.

After 1945, the Soviet Armed Forces and NATO further developed the equipment and doctrine for mechanized infantry. With the exception of airborne formations, the Red Army mechanized all its infantry formations. Initially, wheeled APCs, like the BTR-152, were used, some of which lacked overhead protection and were therefore vulnerable to artillery fire. It still gave the Soviet Army greater strategic flexibility because of the large land area and the long borders of the Soviet Union and its allies in the Warsaw Pact. Armored vehicles meant infantry were capable of overcoming water barriers and having means of protection against Weapons of Mass Destruction.

The US Army established the basic configuration of the tracked APC with the M75 and M59 before it adopted the lighter M113, which could be carried by Lockheed C-130 Hercules and other transport aircraft. The vehicle gave infantry the same mobility as tanks but with much less effective armor protection (it still had nuclear, biological, and chemical protection).

In the Vietnam War, the M113 was often fitted with extra armament and used as an ad hoc infantry fighting vehicle. Early operations by the Army of the Republic of Vietnam using the vehicle showed that troops were far more effective while they were mounted in the vehicles than when they dismounted. American doctrine subsequently emphasized mounted tactics. The Americans ultimately deployed a mechanized brigade and ten mechanized battalions to Vietnam.

The motorized rifle troops of the Soviet Armed Forces were the world's first infantry units that adopted a new class of combat vehicles in 1966 – Infantry fighting vehicles. BMP-1 began entering service in 1966. In the Federal Republic of Germany, an approximate analogue, the Marder, appeared only in 1970. Unlike the APC, which was intended merely to transport the infantry from place to place under armor, the IFV had heavy firepower that could support infantry. The Infantry fighting vehicle concept was subsequently copied by almost all countries of the world.

The introduction of the BMP-1 prompted the development of similar vehicles in Western armies, such as the West German Marder and American M2 Bradley. Many IFVs were also equipped with firing ports from which their infantry could fire their weapons from inside, but they were generally not successful and have been dropped from modern IFVs.

"How to Fight the Soviet Tank-Mechanized Infantry Team" (1976) - De-classified US Army training information reel.

Soviet organization led to different tactics between the "light" and the "heavy" varieties of mechanized infantry. In the Soviet Army, a first-line "motor rifle" division from the 1970s onward usually had two regiments equipped with wheeled BTR-60 APCs and one with the tracked BMP-1 IFV. The "light" regiments were intended to make dismounted attacks on the division's flanks, while the BMP-equipped "heavy" regiment remained mounted and supported the division's tank regiment on the main axis of advance. Both types of infantry regiment still were officially titled "motor rifle" units.

A line of development in the Soviet Armed Forces from the 1980s was the provision of specialized IFVs for use by the Russian Airborne Troops. The first of them was the BMD-1, which had the same firepower as the BMP-1 but could be carried in or even parachuted from the standard Soviet transport aircraft. That made airborne formations into mechanized infantry at the cost of reducing their "bayonet" strength, as the BMD could carry only three or at most four paratroopers in addition to its three-man crew. They were used in that role in the Soviet invasion of Afghanistan in 1979.

== Present day ==
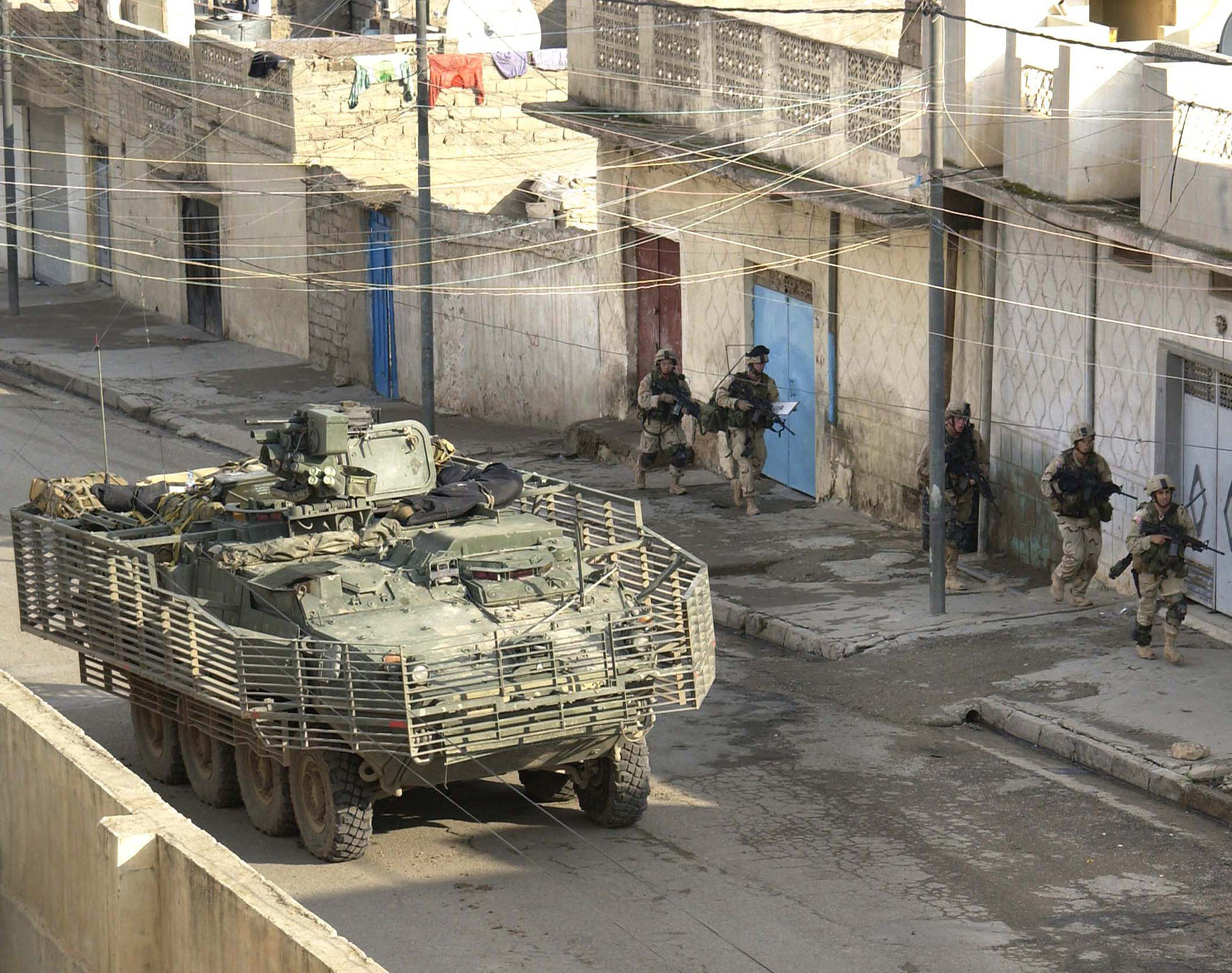
Stryker vehicle and dismounted infantry of the US Army's 1st Brigade Combat Team, 25th Infantry Division in Mosul, Iraq, 2004.

At present, almost all infantry units from industrialized nations are provided with some type of motor transport. Infantry units equipped with IFVs rather than lighter vehicles are commonly designated as "heavy", indicating more combat power but also more costly long-range transportation requirements. In Operation Desert Shield, during the buildup phase of the First Gulf War, the U.S. Army was concerned about the lack of mobility, protection and firepower offered by existing rapid deployment (i.e., airborne) formations; and also about the slowness of deploying regular armored units. The experience led the U.S. Army to form combat brigades based on the Stryker wheeled IFV.

In the British Army, "heavy" units equipped with the Warrior IFV are described as "armoured infantry", and units with the Bulldog APC as "mechanised infantry". This convention is becoming widespread; for example the French Army has "motorisées" units equipped with the wheeled VAB and "mécanisées" units with the tracked AMX-10P.

The transport and other logistic requirements have led many armies to adopt wheeled APCs when their existing stocks of tracked APCs require replacement. An example is the Canadian Army, which has used the LAV III wheeled IFV in fighting in Afghanistan. The Italian, Spanish and Swedish armies are adopting (and exporting) new indigenous-produced tracked IFVs. The Swedish CV90 IFV in particular has been adopted by several armies.

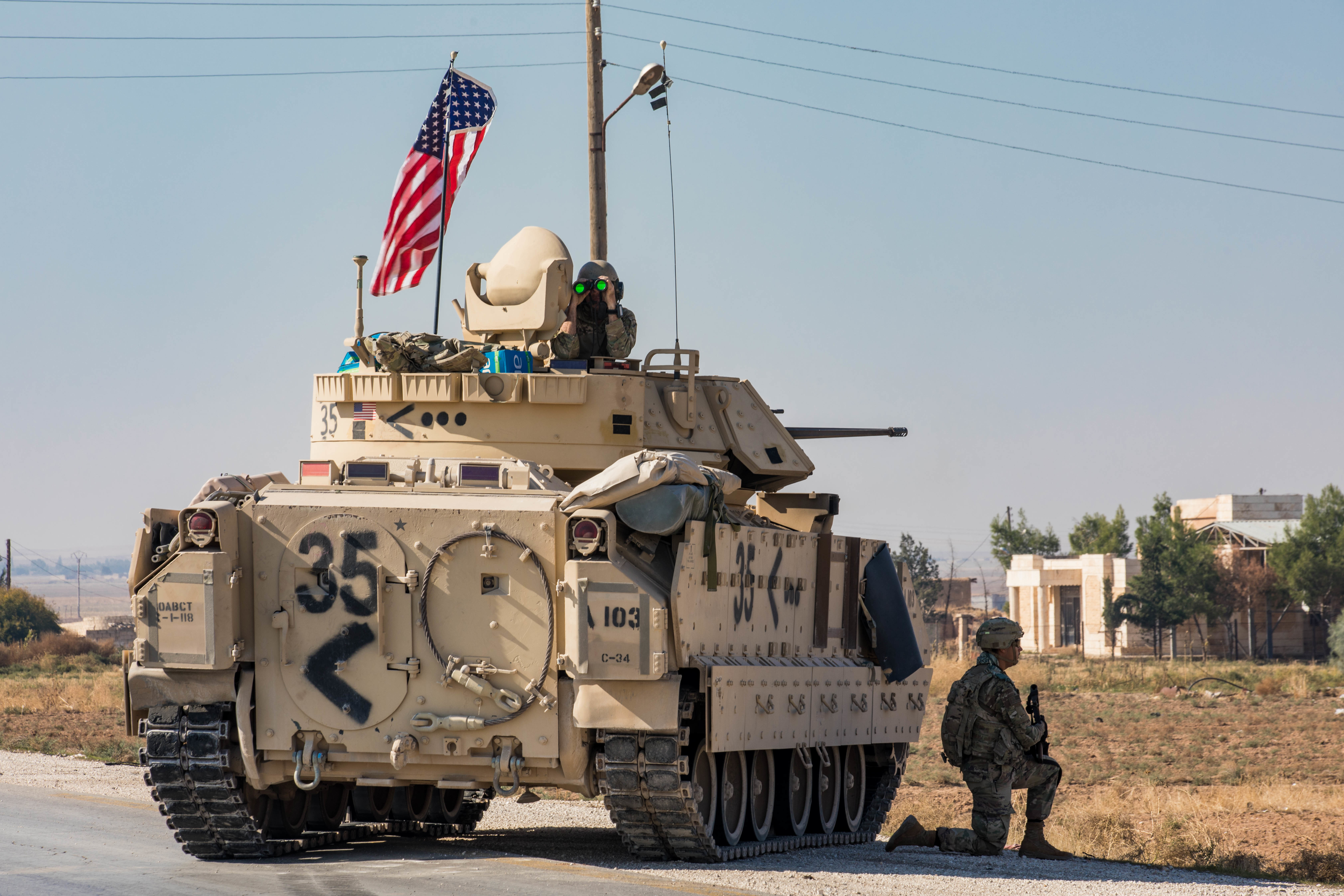
A tracked IFV, the US 30th ABCT's M2A2 Bradley, on patrol in eastern Syria, 2019.

A recent trend among the Israel Defense Forces (IDF) and the Armed Forces of the Russian Federation has been the development and introduction of heavily armored personnel carriers (HAPCs). These vehicles are often converted from obsolete main battle tanks, such as the Soviet T-55, with the IDF Achzarit serving as a prominent example.

Such conversions are generally expedient solutions. Their heavy armor provides greater protection than conventional APCs, particularly in urban combat, but the limited internal space often prevents them from carrying the heavier armament found on infantry fighting vehicles (IFVs) while also accommodating a full infantry squad.

In the Russian Army, heavily armored APCs were developed in part for urban warfare, where vehicles face a high risk from short-range infantry anti-tank weapons such as the RPG-7. This vulnerability became particularly evident during the First Chechen War, when Russian tank and motorized infantry units suffered heavy losses fighting Chechen forces in Grozny in 1995 during the First Chechen War.

Many APCs and IFVs currently under development are intended for rapid deployment by aircraft. New technologies that promise reduction in weight, such as electric drive, may be incorporated. However, facing a similar threat in post-invasion Iraq to that which prompted the Russians to convert tanks to APCs, the occupying armies have found it necessary to apply extra armor to existing APCs and IFVs, which adds to the overall size and weight. Some of the latest designs (such as the German Puma) are intended to allow a light, basic model vehicle, which is air-transportable, to be fitted in the field with additional protection, thereby ensuring both strategic flexibility and survivability.

=== Medium mechanized forces ===
In the late Cold War and early 21st century, various countries developed medium infantry forces armed with armored vehicles, which typically consisted of wheeled armored personnel carriers, infantry fighting vehicles, and assault guns. Medium mechanized forces are characterized by having more strategic air and road mobility than heavier, tank-based armored forces while offering better armor protection for the formation than the lighter motorized infantry formation, in which vehicles were considered "battle taxis" due to poor protection. The earliest experiment was the short-lived Soviet Light Motor Rifle Division in 1987, which consisted of wheeled BTR platforms for its primary armament. In the 1990s, the United States explored Stryker Brigade Combat Team (SBCT) formation and doctrines, which was a medium mechanized infantry formation with all-wheeled platforms centered around Stryker armored personnel carrier. In the early 21st century, China reformed its ground forces with the concept called Medium Combined Arms Brigade (CA-BDE), armed with Type 08 universal wheeled platform. A similar trend of adopting the medium mechanized forces was observed in European countries, including the Italian, Polish, and French armed forces.

== Combined arms operations ==
It is generally accepted that single weapons system types are much less effective without the support of the full combined arms team; the pre-World War II notion of "tank fleets" has proven to be as unsound as the World War I idea of unsupported infantry attacks. Though many nations' armored formations included an organic mechanized infantry component at the start of World War II, the proportion of mechanized infantry in such combined arms formations was increased by most armies as the war progressed.

The lesson was re-learned, first by the Pakistani Army in the 1965 war with India, where the nation fielded two different types of armored divisions: one which was almost exclusively armor (the 1st), while another was more balanced (the 6th). The latter division showed itself to be far more combat-capable than the former.

Having achieved spectacular successes in the offensive with tank-heavy formations during the Six-Day War, the Israel Defense Forces found in the Yom Kippur War of 1973 that a doctrine that relied primarily on tanks and aircraft had proven inadequate. As a makeshift remedy, paratroopers were provided with motorized transport and used as mechanized infantry in coordination with the armor.

== See also ==
- Armoured warfare

== Sources ==
- Dunstan, Simon. Vietnam Tracks: Armor In Battle 1945–1975. 1982 edition, Osprey Publishing; ISBN 0-89141-171-2.
- Starry, Donn A., General. Armored Combat in Vietnam. 1980, Arno Press Inc. ISBN 0-672-52673-5.
