= Tatra 54 =

Tatra 54; Tatra 54/30
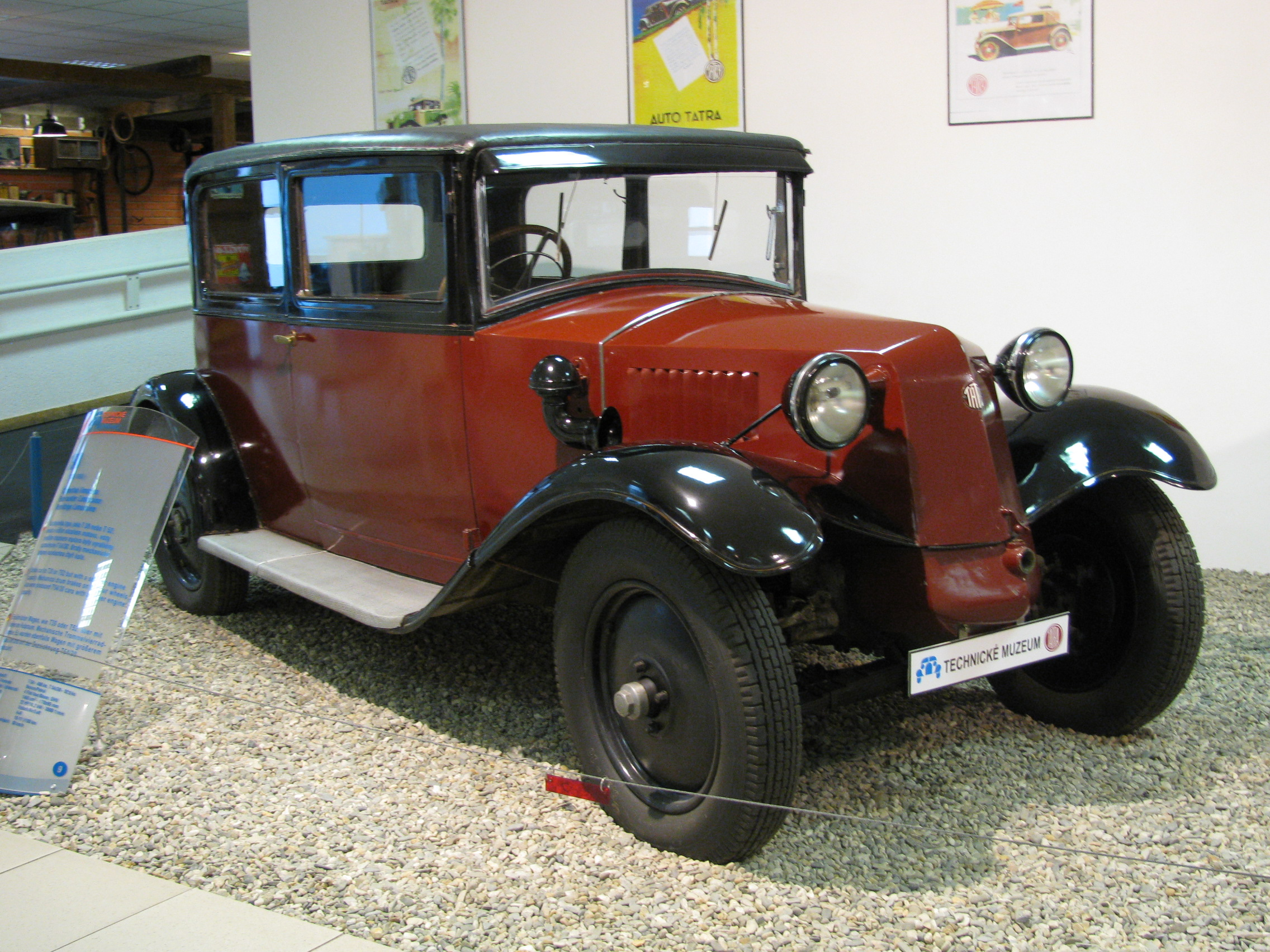

Overview
- Manufacturer: TATRA, a. s.
- Production: 1931–1934; 1510 produced
- Assembly: Kopřivnice, Czechoslovakia

Body and chassis
- Body style: 2+2, Sedan
- Layout: FR
- Related: Tatra 52

Powertrain
- Engine: 1.5L (1465 cc) Tatra 54 F4 (T54); 1.7L (1679 cc) Tatra 30 F4 (T54/30)
- Transmission: 4-speed manual

Dimensions
- Wheelbase: 2,820 mm (111.0 in)

Chronology
- Predecessor: Tatra 30
- Successor: Tatra 75

The Tatra 54 is an automobile launched by Tatra in 1931. An economy version of the Tatra 52, it was replaced in 1933 by the Tatra 75.

The car was powered by an ohv air-cooled four-cylinder boxer motor of 1465 cc, positioned at the front, and giving a claimed output of 22 PS (16 kW; 22 hp). Power was delivered to the rear wheels via a four-speed gear-box. The Tatra 54 featured a central "backbone chassis" a hallmark of Design Chief Ledwinka: the front axle was supported by a transverse leaf spring while a second transverse leaf spring supported the swing rear axle.

Various four- and six-seater saloon bodies were available with two or four doors. During its three-year production run, 1510 Tatra 54s were built.

== Differences between Tatra 30, Tatra 54 and Tatra 54/30 ==
In the 1930s there was rather gradual evolution of Tatra models rather than sudden revolutionary succession, which is typical for auto manufacturers today. In this sense we can see mid-types, which were typical especially for T30, as the car was in production during the Great Depression's economical crises. Although the initial model of T30 is easily distinguishable from last T54, the interim years of production make it sometimes difficult to differentiate, which type a given car might be. The most visible differences cover:

- T54 twodoor looks the same as T30 and T52. The undercarriage is the same as T30 - it has the same front axle, the same gearbox, same rear axle (although with less leaf springs), and the backbone tube is also similar (its length corresponds with given carrossery). The main differentiating characteristic is, that T54 has the bottom edge of the doors at the same height as the sidestep, while T30 has the bottom edge higher than sidestep. There also isn't any steel edge between the bonnet and the front window.
- T54/30 twodoor has the same carrossery as the classical T54. The only difference is that it uses the stronger T30 engine.
- T54/30 fourdoor has a modified carrossery from Tatra 52. It is a kind of transitional type, as it is a merger of older version of T52 and T52's newer carrossery. The roof itself "peaks" over the front window. The adjustment of carrossery lacks the third side window as the roof part is mounted directly behind the second doors. The front door remained unchanged, while the rear doors were adjusted by cutting them in a way to follow the line of the rear mudguard (which makes it look alike Tatra 75 four-door). This type was made because there was surplus of parts of the T52 "transitional" model.
- T54/30 Ambulance - this car needed long tube and therefore it used the long version of T30's backbone. It had the weaker engine from T54 (probably for its economization).
- The first T54s may be liken to the last T12s.

== Gallery ==
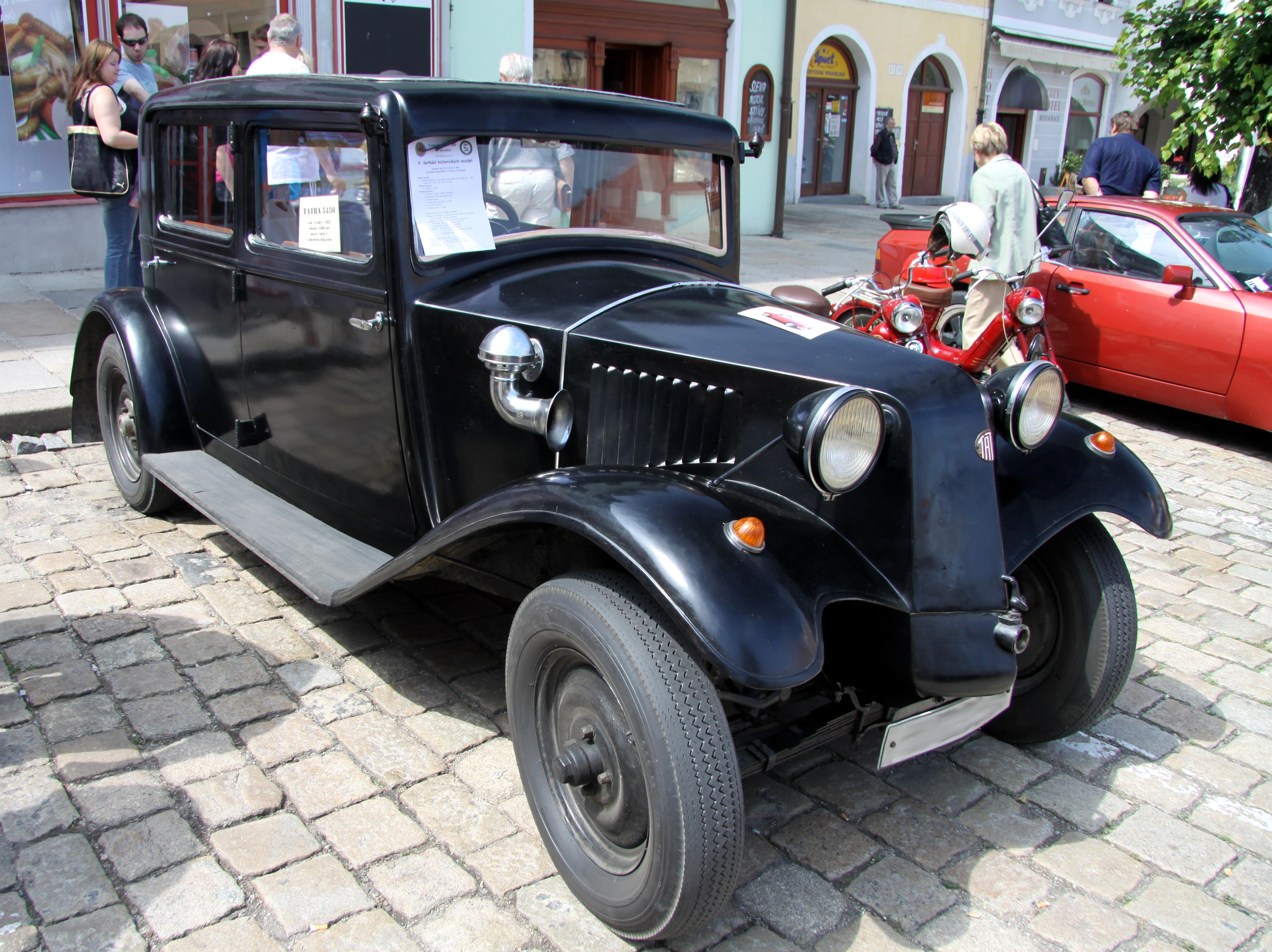

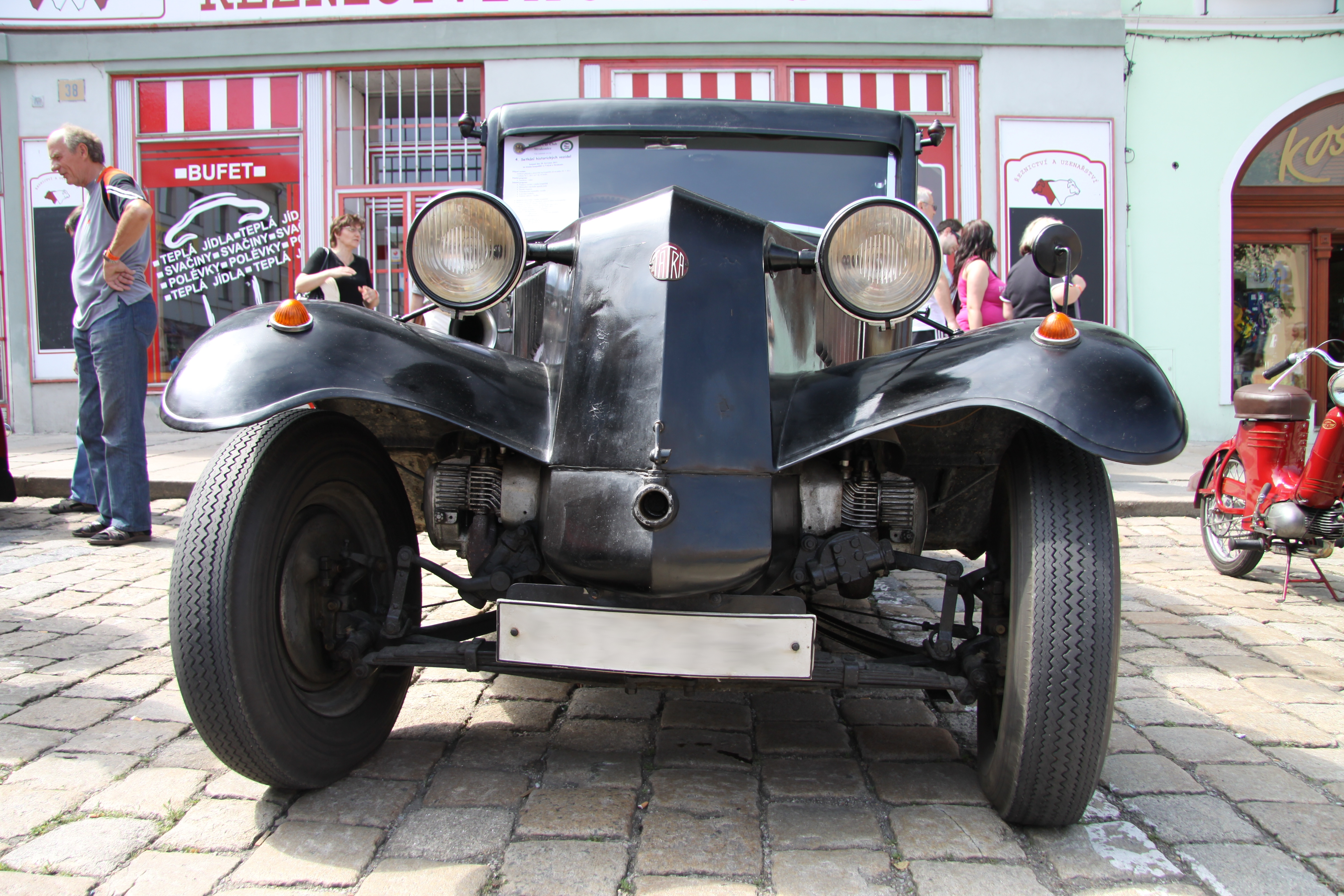

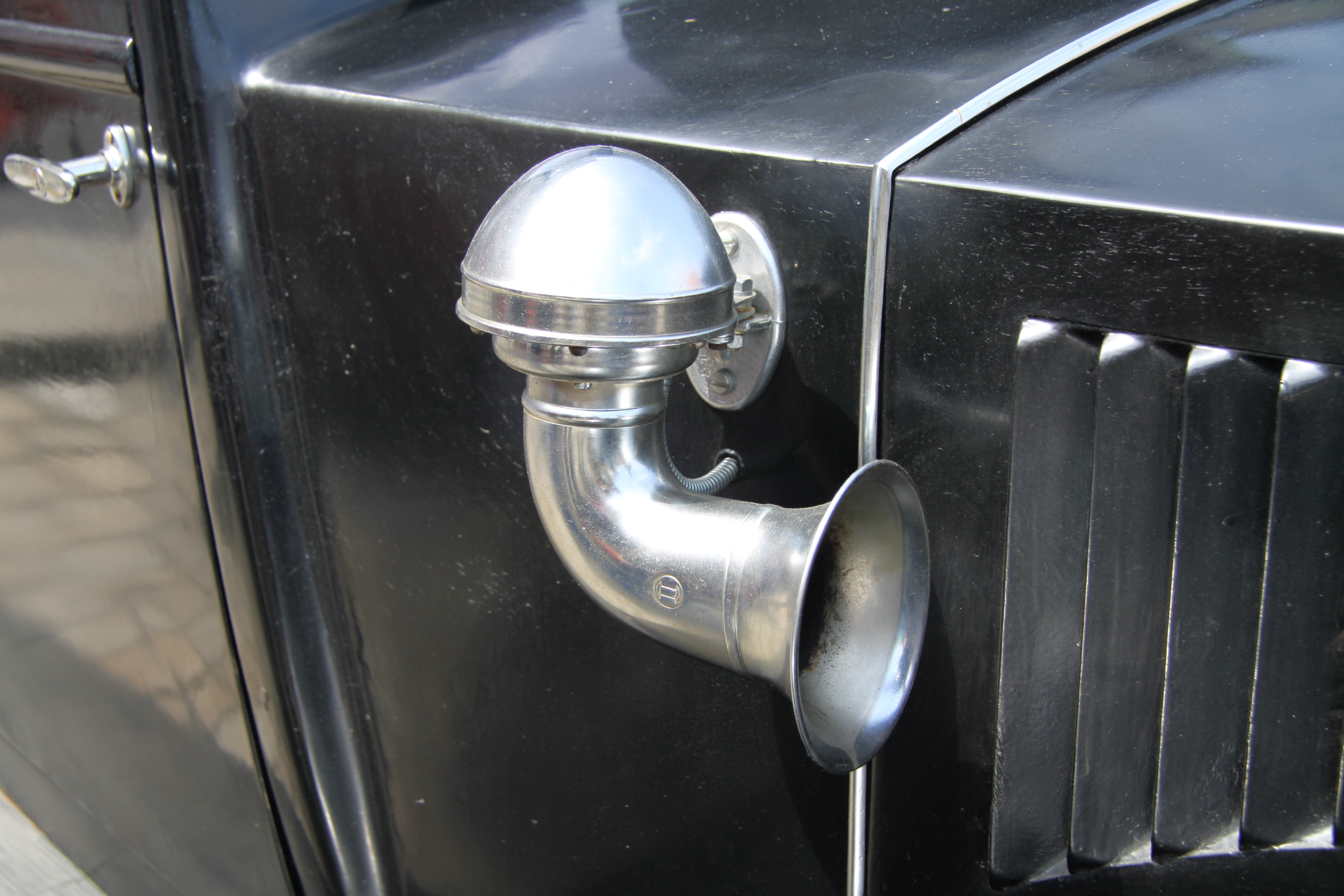
