= Tatra 52 =

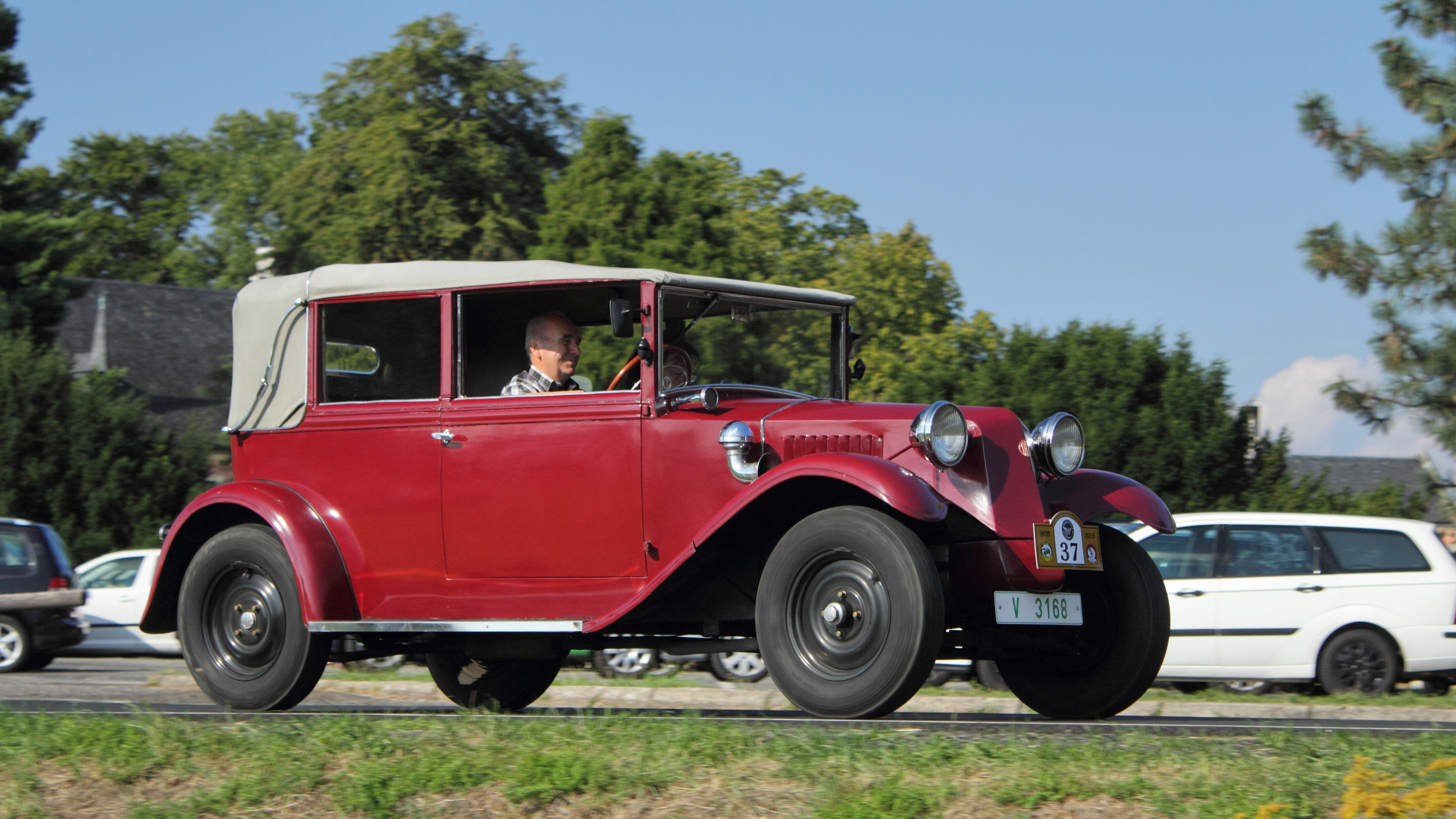
- Tatra 52 two-door convertible

Overview
- Manufacturer: Závody Tatra
- Production: 1931–1939

Body and chassis
- Class: Mid-size car
- Body style: various including sedan, limousine & convertible
- Layout: FR layout
- Chassis: Backbone chassis

Powertrain
- Engine: 1.9L (1911 cc) Tatra 52 F4
- Transmission: 4-speed gearbox

Chronology
- Predecessor: Tatra 30/52

The Tatra 52 is a Czechoslovak mid-size car that was made by Závody Tatra from 1931 to 1939. It was built both at the Tatra factory in Kopřivnice and also under licence by Rohr at Frankfurt am Main in Germany.

== History ==
Tatra launched the Type 52 in 1931 to replace the Type 30/52. Like its predecessor the Type 52 has a Tatra concept backbone chassis. It also has the same 30 hp (22 kW) air-cooled 1,910 cc overhead valve flat-four engine, which gives it a top speed of 90 km/h (56 mph). Its fuel consumption is between 13 and 15 litres per 100 km.

Transmission is by a dry clutch and four-speed gearbox. The rear wheels are on half-axles with transverse leaf springs. The drum brakes are hydraulically operated.

The choice of bodies offered included a four-door sedan, two-door, four-seat convertible, six-seat landaulet by Tatra and more luxurious versions with bodies by a choice of coachbuilders: Bohemia in Česká Lípa and Sodomka in Vysoké Mýto. By 1934 the bonnet had been restyled, with Tatra's traditional enclosed front replaced with a conventional grille.

For 1935 Tatra revised the Type 52 body again to be the same style as the 1,688 cc Tatra 75. Tatra increased the Type 52's power output to 32 hp (24 kW). Bodies offered included a six-seat limousine, six-seat convertible and also an ambulance.

Tatra also used the engine of the Type 52 in other vehicles, including trucks and the Tatra 72 three-axle off-road vehicle.

Type 52 production ceased in 1939, by which time about 1,700 cars had been built. 1,157 of these were four-door limousines.

== Bibliography ==
- Schmarbeck, Wolfgang (1977). Tatra, Die Geshichte Tatra Automobile (in German). Bad Oeynhausen: Verlag des Internationalen Auto und Motorrad-Museums. ASIN B015S8O2OS.
- Tuček, Jan (2017). Auta první republiky 1918–1938 (in Czech). Prague: Grada Publishing. pp. 152–156, 281–283. ISBN 978-80-271-0466-6.
