= Tae-hyun =

- Hangul: 태현
- RR: Taehyeon
- MR: T'aehyŏn

Tae-hyun, also spelled Tae-hyeon, is a Korean given name.

People with this name include:

- Kim Tae-hyun (weightlifter) (born 1969), South Korean weightlifter
- Samuel Youn (born Yoon Tae-hyun, 1971), South Korean operatic bass baritone
- Cha Tae-hyun (born 1976), South Korean actor
- Jin Tae-hyun (born 1981), South Korean actor
- Tae Hyun Bang (born 1983), South Korean mixed martial artist
- Jeon Soo-hyun (born Jeon Tae-hyun, 1986), South Korean football player
- Roh Tae-hyun (born 1993), South Korean singer, former member of boy group Hotshot
- Nam Tae-hyun (born 1994), South Korean singer, member of band South Club, and former member of boy group Winner
- Hwang Tae-hyeon (born 1999), South Korean football player
- Kang Tae-hyun (stage name Taehyun, born 2002), South Korean singer, member of boy group Tomorrow X Together

Fictional characters:

- Kim Tae-hyun from 2015 television series Yong-pal

== See also ==
- List of Korean given names
