= Tatra 90 =

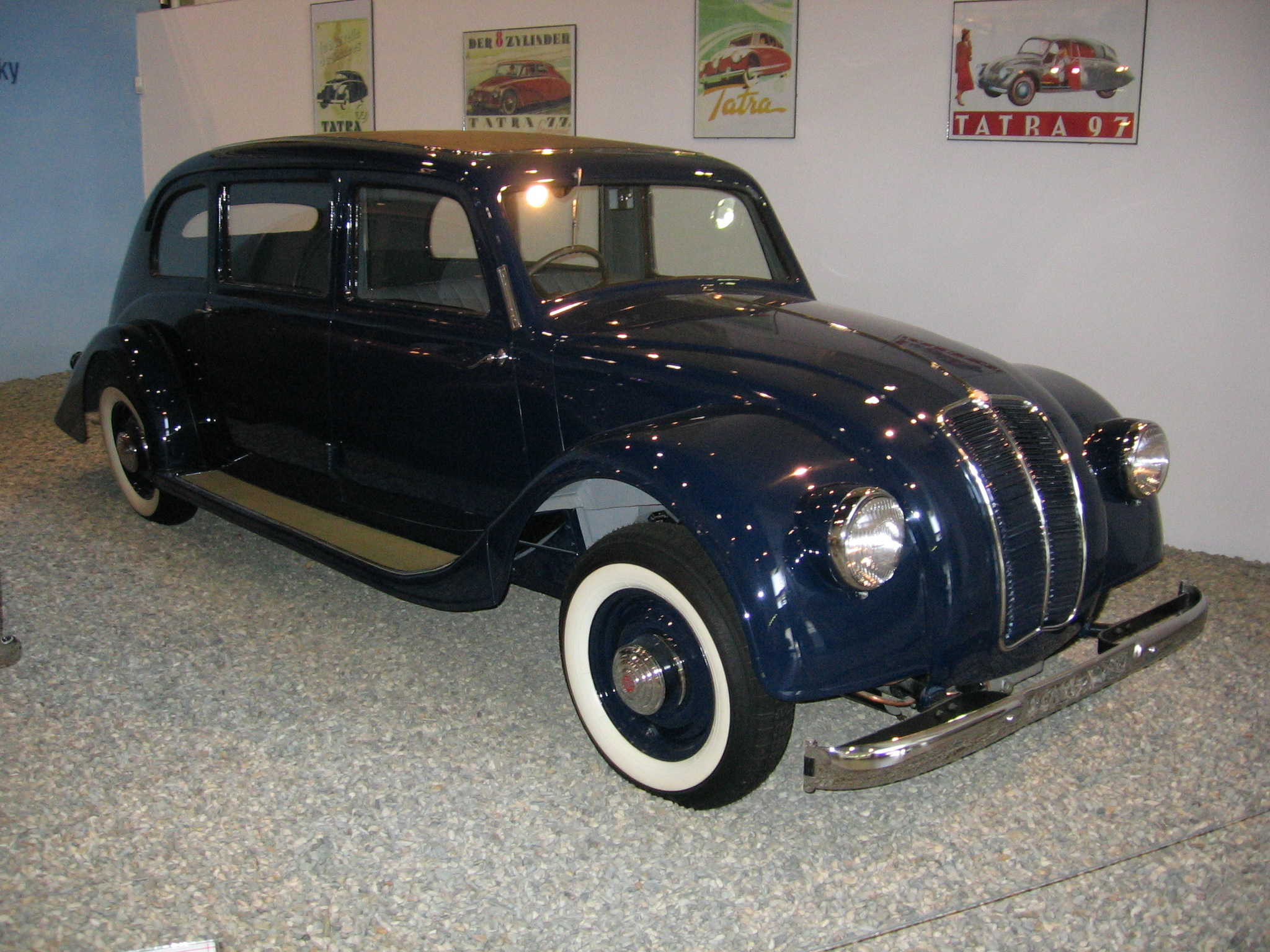
- Tatra 90 in the Tatra Museum

Overview
- Manufacturer: Tatra
- Production: 1935; 2 produced

Body and chassis
- Class: Mid-size
- Body style: 4-door sedan
- Layout: FR layout

Powertrain
- Engine: 2.5L Tatra 82 F4
- Transmission: 4-speed manual

Dimensions
- Wheelbase: 3,220 mm (126.8 in)
- Curb weight: 1,450 kg (3,197 lb)

The Tatra 90 is a Czechoslovak prototype mid-size car, made by Tatra in Kopřivnice in 1935.

The car has an air-cooled four-cylinder OHC 2,490 cc boxer engine, the same as in the Type 82. The engine produced 55 hp (41 kW), giving the car a 90 km/h (56 mph) top speed. The engine is front-mounted engine with rear-wheel drive. Transmission is via a single-disc dry clutch and four-speed transmission with synchronized third and fourth gears. The car has a tubular backbone chassis, front axle with transverse leaf spring, and oscillating rear axles with a transverse leaf spring.

The body is a four-door, six-seater sedan, reminiscent of the aerodynamic Type 77 at the front and rear, but with separate fenders and integrated headlights and running boards.

Probably two prototypes were built. The car did not enter series production.

== Sources ==
- Schmarbeck, Wolfgang (1977). Tatra, Die Geshichte Tatra Automobile (in German). Bad Oeynhausen: Verlag des Internationalen Auto und Motorrad-Museums. ASIN B015S8O2OS.
- Tuček, Jan (2017). Auta první republiky 1918–1938 (in Czech). Prague: Grada Publishing. p. 284. ISBN 978-80-271-0466-6.
