= List of awards and nominations received by Winner =

Winner awards and nominations
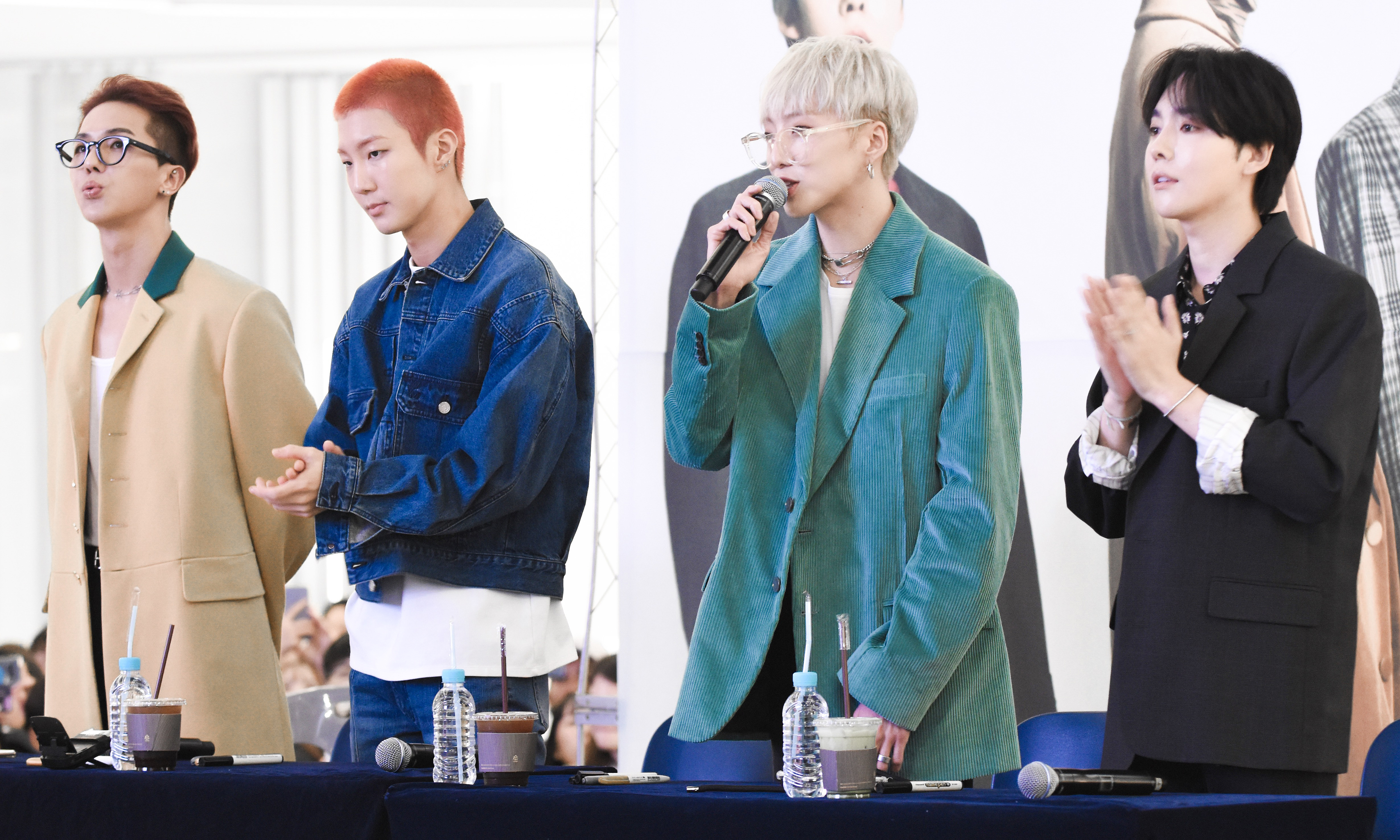
- Winner in 2019
Awards and nominations
| Award | Wins | Nominations |
| Asia Artist Awards | 0 | 3 |
| Asian Pop Music Awards | 0 | 1 |
| Gaon Chart Music Awards | 1 | 8 |
| Golden Disc Awards | 2 | 9 |
| MBC Plus X Genie Music Awards | 0 | 3 |
| Melon Music Awards | 3 | 16 |
| Mnet Asian Music Awards | 1 | 11 |
| MTV Asia Music Gala | 1 | 1 |
| QQ Music Awards | 1 | 1 |
| Seoul Music Awards | 0 | 14 |
| Soribada Best K-Music Awards | 0 | 5 |
| Tudou Young Choice Awards | 1 | 1 |
| Other awards | 7 | 9 |

Totals (Note: Certain award groups do not simply award one winner. They acknowledge several different recipients, have runners-up, and have third place. Since this is a specific recognition and is different from losing an award, runner-up mentions are considered wins in this award tally. For simplification and to avoid errors, each award in this list has been presumed to have had a prior nomination.)
- Wins: 17
- Nominations: 82

This is a list of awards and nominations received by Winner, a South Korean boy band who debuted under YG Entertainment in August 2014. Winner has received a total of 17 awards out of 82 nominations.

== Korean ==
=== Asia Artist Awards ===
| Year | Category | Recipient | Result |
|---|---|---|---|
| 2016 | Most Popular Artists (Singer) – Top 50 | Winner | Nominated |
| 2017 | Popularity Award (Singer) | Winner | Nominated |
| 2018 | Popularity Award (Singer) | Winner | Nominated |

=== Circle Chart Music Awards (formerly Gaon Chart Music Awards) ===
| Year | Category | Recipient | Result |
|---|---|---|---|
| 2015 | New Artist of the Year (Male Group) | Winner | Won |
| 2015 | Song of the Year (August) | "Empty" | Nominated |
| 2015 | Song of the Year (September) | "Empty" | Nominated |
| 2017 | Song of the Year (February) | "Baby Baby" | Nominated |
| 2017 | Song of the Year (February) | "Sentimental" | Nominated |
| 2018 | Song of the Year (April) | "Really Really" | Nominated |
| 2018 | Song of the Year (August) | "Love Me Love Me" | Nominated |
| 2020 | Song of the Year (May) | "Ah Yeah (아예)" | Nominated |

=== Golden Disc Awards ===
| Year | Category | Recipient | Result |
|---|---|---|---|
| 2015 | Disc Bonsang | 2014 S/S | Nominated |
| 2015 | Digital Bonsang | "Empty" | Nominated |
| 2015 | Best New Artist of the Year (Male Group) | Winner | Won |
| 2015 | Popularity Award | Winner | Nominated |
| 2018 | Digital Daesang | "Really Really" | Nominated |
| 2018 | Digital Bonsang | "Really Really" | Won |
| 2018 | Global Popularity Award | Winner | Nominated |
| 2019 | Popularity Award | Winner | Nominated |
| 2019 | NetEase Most Popular K-pop Star | Winner | Nominated |

=== MBC Plus X Genie Music Awards ===
| Year | Category | Recipient | Result |
|---|---|---|---|
| 2018 | Song of the Year | "Everyday" | Nominated |
| 2018 | Rap/Hip Hop Music Award | "Everyday" | Nominated |
| 2018 | Genie Music Popularity Award | Winner | Nominated |

=== Melon Music Awards ===
| Year | Category | Recipient | Result |
|---|---|---|---|
| 2014 | Best New Artist | Winner | Won |
| 2014 | Top 10 Artists | Winner | Won |
| 2014 | Netizen Popularity Award | Winner | Nominated |
| 2014 | Artist of the Year | Winner | Nominated |
| 2014 | Album of the Year | 2014 S/S | Nominated |
| 2016 | Top 10 Artists | Winner | Nominated |
| 2016 | Netizen Popularity Award | Winner | Nominated |
| 2016 | Kakao Hot Star Award | Winner | Nominated |
| 2016 | Best Dance Track Award | "Sentimental" | Nominated |
| 2017 | Top 10 Artists | Winner | Won |
| 2017 | Artist of the Year | Winner | Nominated |
| 2017 | Netizen Popularity Award | Winner | Nominated |
| 2017 | Kakao Hot Star Award | Winner | Nominated |
| 2017 | Song of the Year | "Really Really" | Nominated |
| 2017 | Best Dance Track Award | "Really Really" | Nominated |
| 2019 | Top 10 Artists | Winner | Nominated |

=== Mnet Asian Music Awards ===
| Year | Category | Recipient | Result |
|---|---|---|---|
| 2014 | Best New Artist | Winner | Won |
| 2014 | Artist of the Year | Winner | Nominated |
| 2017 | 2017 Favorite KPOP Star | Winner | Nominated |
| 2017 | Best Vocal Performance Group | "Really Really" | Nominated |
| 2017 | Song of the Year | "Really Really" | Nominated |
| 2017 | Mwave Global Fans' Choice | "Really Really" | Nominated |
| 2019 | Song of the Year | "Millions" | Nominated |
| 2019 | Worldwide Fans' Choice | Winner | Nominated |
| 2019 | Best Vocal Performance Group | Winner | Nominated |
| 2020 | Best Vocal Performance – Group | "Hold" | Nominated |
| 2020 | Song of the Year | "Hold" | Nominated |
| 2022 | Worldwide Fans' Choice | Winner | Nominated |
| 2022 | Best Vocal Performance - Group | "I LOVE U" | Nominated |

=== Seoul Music Awards ===
Winner was nominated in 15 categories without a single win.

| Year | Category | Recipient | Result |
|---|---|---|---|
| 2015 | Bonsang Award | Winner | Nominated |
| 2015 | New Artist Award | Winner | Nominated |
| 2015 | Popularity Award | Winner | Nominated |
| 2015 | Hallyu Special Award | Winner | Nominated |
| 2017 | Bonsang Award | Winner | Nominated |
| 2017 | Popularity Award | Winner | Nominated |
| 2017 | Hallyu Special Award | Winner | Nominated |
| 2018 | Bonsang Award | Winner | Nominated |
| 2018 | Popularity Award | Winner | Nominated |
| 2018 | Hallyu Special Award | Winner | Nominated |
| 2020 | Bonsang Award | Winner | Nominated |
| 2020 | Hallyu Special Award | Winner | Nominated |
| 2020 | Popularity Award | Winner | Nominated |
| 2020 | QQ Music Most Popular K-Pop Artist Award | Winner | Nominated |
| 2022 | Bonsang Award | Winner | Nominated |

=== Soribada Best K-Music Awards ===
| Year | Category | Recipient | Result |
|---|---|---|---|
| 2017 | Bonsang Award | Winner | Nominated |
| 2017 | Popularity Award | Winner | Nominated |
| 2018 | Bonsang Award | Winner | Nominated |
| 2019 | Bonsang Award | Winner | Nominated |
| 2019 | Popularity Award | Winner | Nominated |

== Chinese ==
=== Tudou Young Choice Awards ===
| Year | Category | Recipient | Result |
|---|---|---|---|
| 2014 | Most Popular Korean Group | Winner | Won |

=== QQ Music Awards ===
| Year | Category | Recipient | Result |
|---|---|---|---|
| 2015 | Best New Force Group | Winner | Won |

=== MTV Asia Music Gala ===
| Year | Category | Recipient | Result |
|---|---|---|---|
| 2016 | Overseas Popularity Award | Winner | Won |

== Other awards ==
| Year | Award | Category | Recipient | Result |
|---|---|---|---|---|
| 2014 | A-Awards | Contemporary (Mont Blanc Homme) Award | Winner | Won |
| 2014 | SBS MTV Best of the Best | Rookie of the Year | Winner | Nominated |
| 2014 | SBS Gayo Daejeon | Best New Artist | Winner | Won |
| 2014 | Style Icon Awards | New Icons | Winner | Won |
| 2016 | Style Icon Awards | Awesome K-Style | Winner | Won |
| 2017 | Sports Dong-a Awards | The Flower Path of the Year | Winner | Won |
| 2019 | V Live Awards | Artist Top 10 | Winner | Won |
| 2019 | V Live Awards | Best Channel – 1 million followers | Winner | Nominated |
| 2019 | V Live Awards | Global Artist Top 12 | Winner | Won |
| 2020 | Asian Pop Music Awards (Note: Hosted by the Hong Kong Asia Pacific International Group and Sunway Records, the Asian Pop Music Awards bases its winners on the "Asian Pop Music Chart" which opened in September 2019.) | Best Male Group (Overseas) | Remember | Nominated |
| 2022 | Asian Pop Music Awards | Best Album (Overseas) | Holiday | Nominated |
