= 90 (EP) =

EP by South Club
- Released: June 27, 2017
- Studio: Tone (Seoul)
- Genres: Rock, blues
- Length: 23:56
- Label: South Buyers Club
- Producers: Nam Tae-hyun; Kim Eui-myeong

South Club chronology
90 (2017)	20 (2018)

Singles from 90
- 1. "I Got the Blues" Released: June 27, 2017; 2. "Liar" Released: June 27, 2017

90 is the debut EP of Korean rock band South Club. They released their first single, "Hug Me" on May 26, 2017, which was then followed by their studio album released on June 27, 2017 under the record label South Buyers Club. The album was mainly composed and produced by Nam Tae-hyun, who is also the leader of the band.

== Background and release ==
On June 22, 2017, Nam uploaded a teaser of the album cover and also announced the release date of the album, With double title tracks "I Got the blues" and "Liar".

== Track listing ==
No.	Title	Lyrics	Music	Arrangement	Length
1.	"Dirty House" (더러운 집; Deoreoun jip)	Nam Tae-hyun	Nam Tae-hyun	South Club	3:14
2.	"I Got the Blues"	Nam Tae-hyun	Nam Tae-hyun	South Club	3:09
3.	"Believe U"	Nam Tae-hyun	Nam Tae-hyun	South Club	3:46
4.	"Hug Me"	Nam Tae-hyun	Nam Tae-hyun	Nam Tae-hyun	4:23
5.	"I.D.S"	Nam Tae-hyun	Nam Tae-hyun	South Club	3:51
6.	"Liar"	Nam Tae-hyun	Nam Tae-hyun	Nam Tae-hyun	3:58
7.	"See you" (Outro)		Kim Eui-myeong	Kim Eui-myeong	2:55
Total length:					23:56

== Sales ==
According to Gaon Albums Chart, the EP sold over 5,155 copies.

== Chart ==
Chart (2017)	Peak position
South Korean Albums (Gaon)	4

== Release history ==
Region	Date	Format	Label
Various	June 27, 2017	Digital download; streaming	South Buyers Club; NHN
South Korea	June 27, 2017	CD	South Buyers Club; NHN
