= 90th Brigade =

90th Brigade may refer to:

== British India ==
- 90th Indian Infantry Brigade

== Spain ==
- 90th Mixed Brigade, see Mixed brigade § 1st to 100th

== United Kingdom ==
- 90th Brigade (United Kingdom)
- 90th Brigade, Royal Field Artillery, British Army unit in World War I
- 90th (City of London) Brigade, Royal Field Artillery, British Army unit after World War I

== United States ==
- 90th Sustainment Brigade
- 90th Troop Command, a brigade-sized unit

== See also ==
- 90th Division (disambiguation)
- 90th Regiment (disambiguation)
