= Tatra 75 =

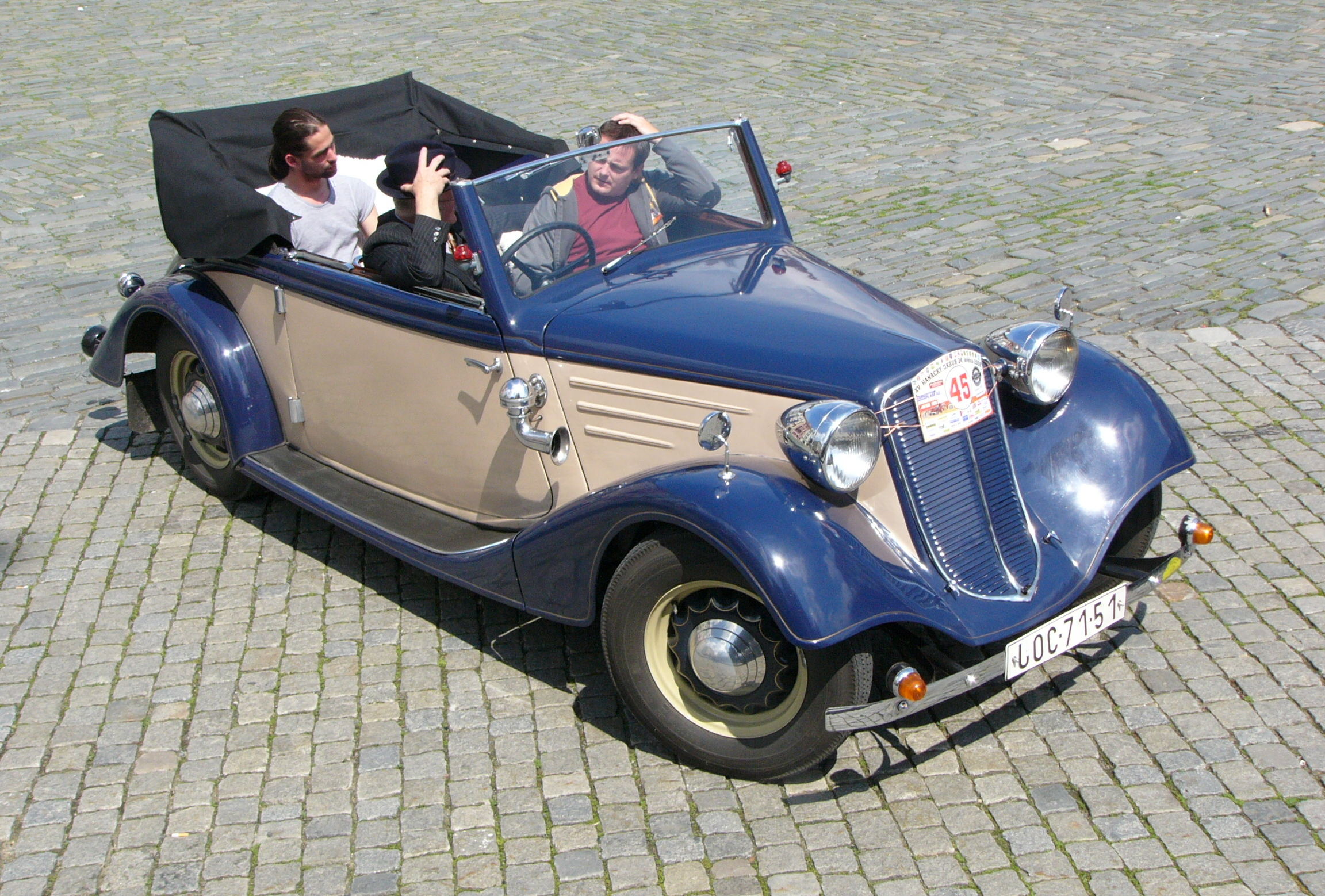
- Tatra 75 convertible

Overview
- Manufacturer: Tatra
- Production: 1933–1942

Body and chassis
- Layout: Front-engine, rear-wheel-drive

Powertrain
- Engine: 1.7L (1688 cc) Tatra 75 F4
- Transmission: 4-speed manual

Dimensions
- Wheelbase: 2,700 mm (106.3 in); 3,200 mm (126.0 in)

Chronology
- Predecessor: Tatra 54
- Successor: Tatra 600

The Tatra 75 is a Czechoslovak mid-size car that Tatra introduced in 1933 as the successor to the Tatra 54 and was Tatra's last front-engined car.

The front-mounted 1,688 cc air-cooled OHV air-cooled boxer engine produces 30 PS (22 kW). This gives a top speed of 90 km/h (56 mph) and fuel consumption of 12 or 13 litres per 100 km (62 mi).

Attention was paid to weight reduction, with light alloy used for the cylinder head castings. In common with other Tatras of this time, the 75 had four-speed transmission and rear-wheel drive.

The car was offered with a range of bodies including two- and four-door sedans and convertibles and a six-seat limousine with a longer wheelbase. In its nine-year production run 4,501 Tatra 75s were built. After the Second World War, in 1947, the model was belatedly replaced with the radically different Tatra 600.

Three Tatra 75 Sport roadsters were built by Bohemia in the 1930s. These were 3 seat vehicles based on the 75 chassis.

== Sources ==
- Schmarbeck, Wolfgang (1977). Tatra, Die Geshichte Tatra Automobile (in German). Bad Oeynhausen: Verlag des Internationalen Auto und Motorrad-Museums. ASIN B015S8O2OS.
- Tuček, Jan (2017). Auta první republiky 1918–1938 (in Czech). Prague: Grada Publishing. pp. 160–162, 278–280. ISBN 978-80-271-0466-6.
