= Tatra 92 =

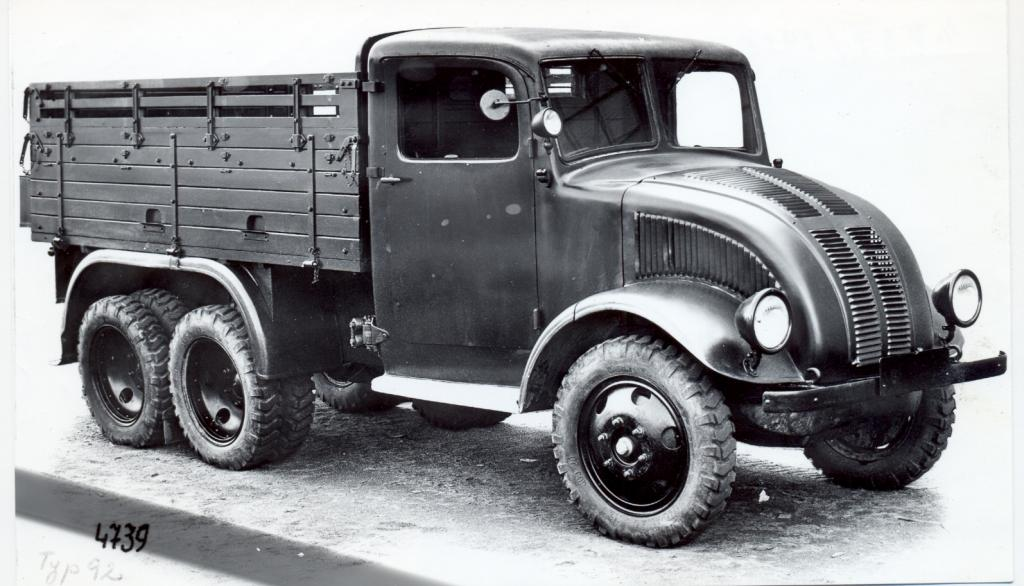
- Tatra 92 early model

Overview
- Manufacturer: Tatra
- Also called: Tatra 93 (6×6 version)
- Production: 1937-1941; 529 produced

Body and chassis
- Class: Truck
- Body style: Conventional

Powertrain
- Engine: 4.0L Tatra 92 V8
- Transmission: 4-speed manual + 1-speed gearbox

Dimensions
- Wheelbase: 2,800 mm (110.2 in) + 940 mm (37.0 in)
- Length: 5.5 m (18 ft)
- Width: 2 m (6.6 ft)
- Curb weight: 3,800 kg (8,378 lb)

Chronology
- Predecessor: Tatra 82

The Tatra 92 was an 6×4 off-road military truck model made by Czech manufacturer Tatra between 1937 and 1941. It was mainly used for transporting military cargo and personnel in Czech and later German armies, variants such as ambulance and field kitchen trucks were also produced. The significant part of the production batch was exported to Kingdom of Romania.

The vehicle was equipped with an air-cooled OHC V8 engine with 3981 cc rated to 54.5 kW (73.1 hp) power at 2500 rpm. The fuel consumption was up to 35 liters per 100 km (62 mi). The truck had three axles, of which both back axles were driven. It had 4 forward gears and 1 reverse gear. The truck chassis, based on the Tatra backbone chassis conception, has 1,800 kg (3,968 lb) empty weight. It was rated for 2,000 kg (4,409 lb) payload. The Tatra 92 was capable of traveling at 65 km/h (40 mph) speed.

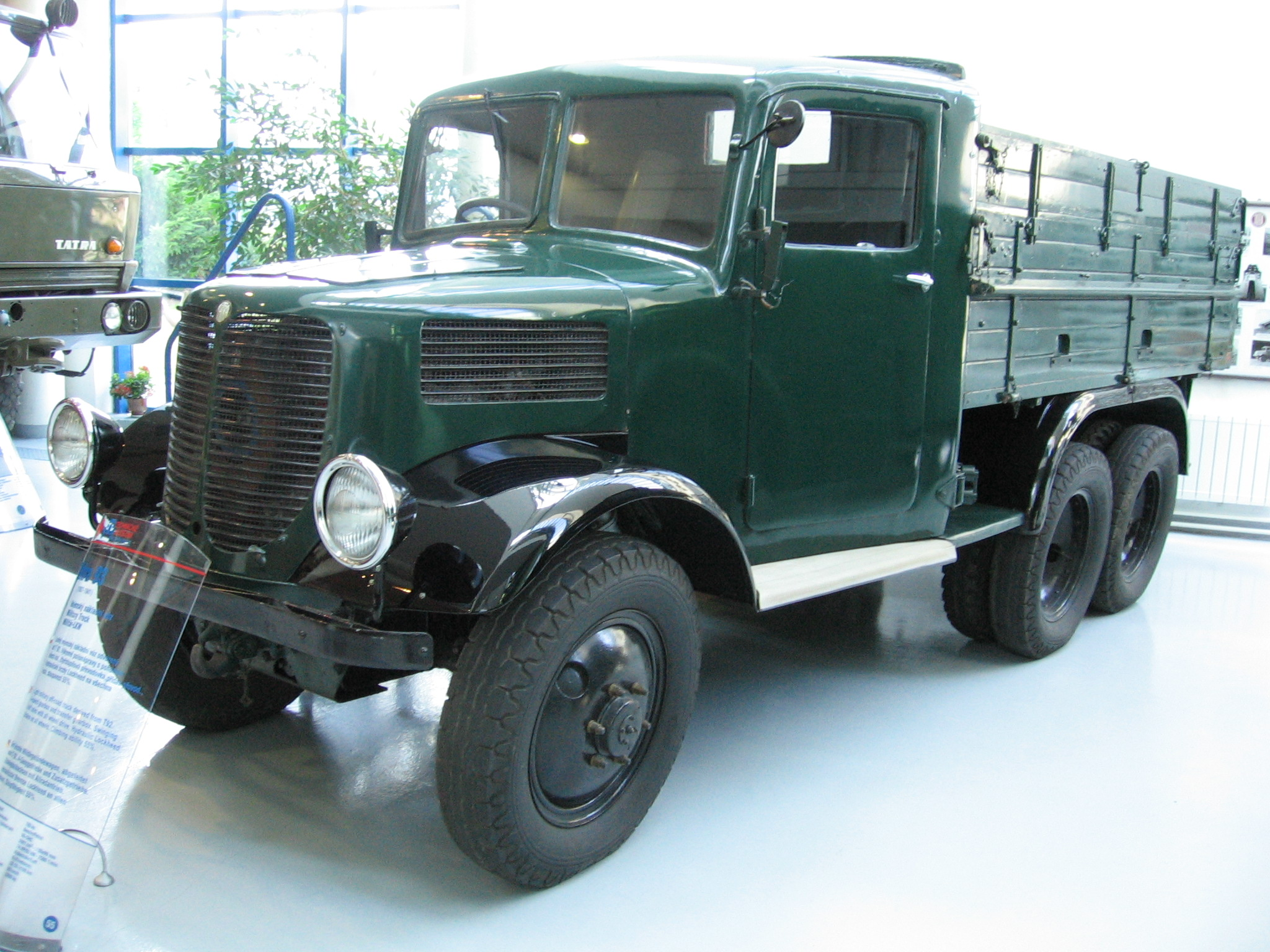
Tatra 93

In 1939, 80 cars of the Tatra 93 version with all three axles driven (6×6) were also produced exclusively for the Kingdom of Romania's Army. Tatra 93 was built as a high capacity staff car with removable roof. The modification increased the chassis weight by 50 kg (110 lb). In total, 200 Tatra 93 trucks were acquired by the Romanian Army.
