= Tatra 72 =

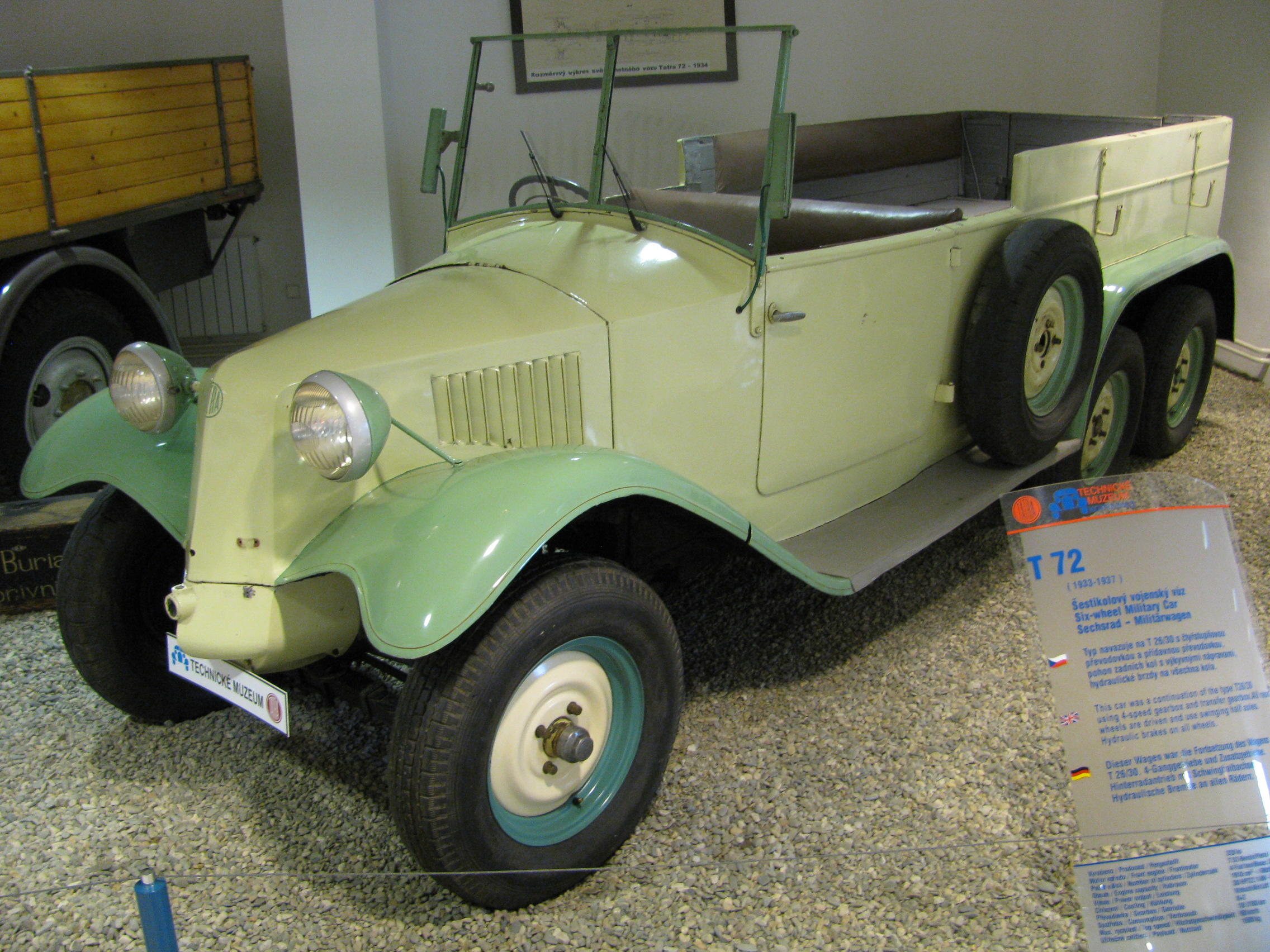
- Tatra 72

Overview
- Manufacturer: Tatra
- Production: 321+license production

Body and chassis
- Class: Truck
- Body style: Conventional

Powertrain
- Engine: 1.9 L Tatra 52 F4
- Transmission: 4-speed manual + 1-speed gearbox

Dimensions
- Wheelbase: 3,820 mm (150.4 in)
- Curb weight: 1,350 kg (2,976 lb)

Chronology
- Predecessor: Tatra 26/30
- Successor: Tatra 82

The Tatra 72 was an army off-road truck model made by Czech manufacturer Tatra between 1933 and 1937. It was mainly used for transporting military cargo (mainly ammunition), personnel and towing artillery pieces in Czech and later German armies. The design was also license-built in France by Lorraine-Dietrich, as the Lorraine 72.

The vehicle had an air-cooled OHC four-cylinder engine with 1981 cc rated to 22 kW (30 hp) power. Fuel consumption was up to 20 liters per 100 km. The car had 3 axles, of which both back axles were driven, resulting in offroad capabilities significantly superior to the majority of contemporary models. It had 4 gears and 1 reverse gear. The truck chassis, based on the Tatra backbone chassis conception, has a 908 kg (2,002 lb) empty weight, and the passenger version typically weighted between 1,300–1,400 kg (2,866–3,086 lb). The Tatra 72 was capable of traveling at 65 km/h (40 mph) speed. In the most common passenger version it was capable of carrying 13 men besides the driver, or 1,500 kg (3,307 lb) of cargo.

Since 1934, the 52 chassis of the Tatra 72 version were extensively modified to produce an armored car OA vz. 30. Other specialized versions have included telephone cable layers (52 built in 1933–1935), and machine gun carriers (23 delivered in August 1934). Also, in the first half of 1935 Tatra has delivered 100 pure cargo chassis. Another common (80 produced) model were command-maintenance cars build with two different cabin lengths, capable of carrying 5 passengers plus mixed cargo-passenger space at the rear. These cars were routinely issued to the commanders of the artillery regiments of the Czechoslovak army. Finally, 14 chassis were built as tourers with passenger space only.

== Image gallery ==
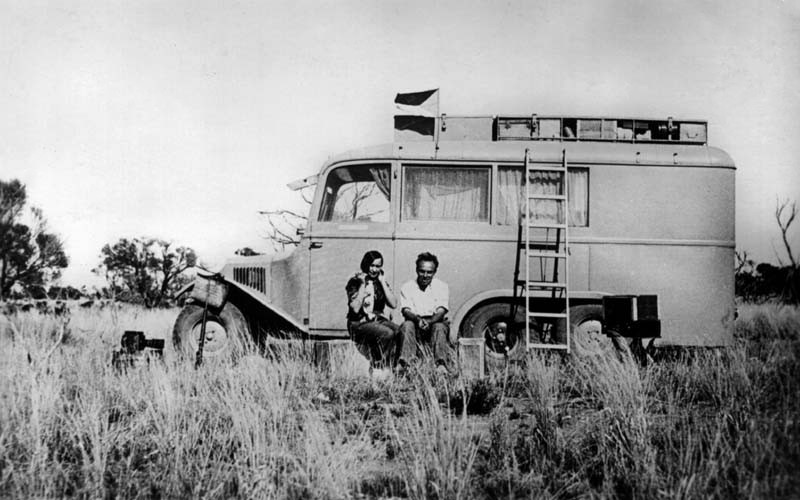
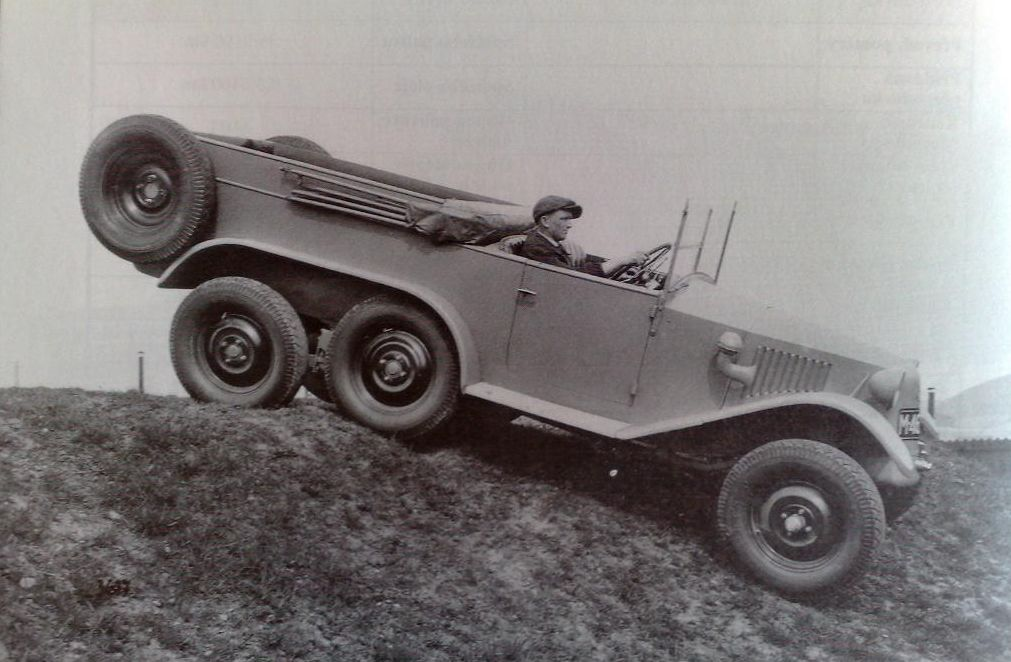
