= 90th Division (2nd Formation) (People's Republic of China) =

90th Division (1950–52)
- Active: 1950.10 - 1952.5
- Country: People's Republic of China
- Branch: People's Liberation Army
- Type: Division
- Role: Infantry

The 90th Division (Chinese: 第90师)(2nd Formation) was created in October 1950 basing on the 15th Security Brigade of Huadong Military Region.

In June 1952 the division was inactivated and reorganized as 1st Hydraulic Engineering Construction Division.

As of inactivation the division was composed of:

- 268th Regiment;
- 269th Regiment;
- 270th Regiment.
