= 90th Division =

90th Division may refer to:

== Infantry divisions ==
- 90th Division (1st Formation) (People's Republic of China), 1949–1950
- 90th Division (2nd Formation) (People's Republic of China), 1950–1952
- 90th Light Infantry Division, Wehrmacht, Germany
- 90th Guards Rifle Division, Soviet Union
- 90th Infantry Division (United States)

== Armoured division ==
- 90th Guards Tank Division (1965–1985), Soviet Union
- 90th Guards Tank Division (1985–1997), Soviet Union, 1985–1992 and Russia, 1992–1997
- 90th Guards Tank Division (2016–present), Russia

== Aviation divisions ==
- 90th Air Division, United States

== See also ==
- List of military divisions by number
- 90th Brigade (disambiguation)
- 90th Regiment (disambiguation)
- 90th Squadron (disambiguation)
