= 90th Division (1st Formation) (People's Republic of China) =

90th Division (1949–50)
- Active: 1949.2 - 1950.6
- Country: People's Republic of China
- Branch: People's Liberation Army
- Type: Division
- Role: Infantry
- Part of: 30th Army
- Engagements: Chinese Civil War

The 90th Division (Chinese: 第90师) was created in February 1949 under the Regulation of the Redesignations of All Organizations and Units of the Army, issued by Central Military Commission on November 1, 1948, basing on the 36th Brigade, 12th Column of the PLA Huadong Field Army, formed in July 1948.

The division was part of 30th Army. Under the flag of 90th division it took part in the Chinese Civil War. In July 1950 the division was inactivated and reorganized as 4th Aviation Brigade.

As of inactivation the division was composed of:

- 268th Regiment
- 269th Regiment
- 270th Regiment
