= Tatra 30 =

Tatra 30; Tatra 30/52
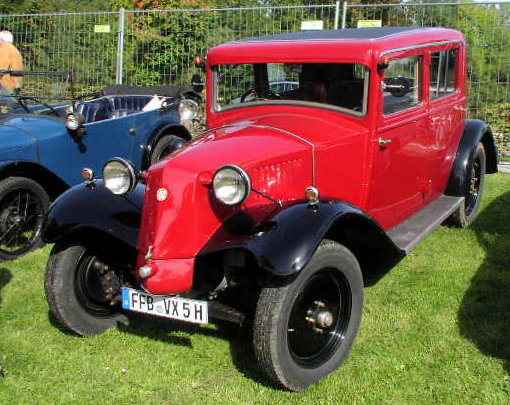

Overview
- Manufacturer: Tatra
- Production: 1926–1931 Tatra 30; 1929–1931 Tatra 30/52; 3785 Tatra 30 produced; 94 Tatra 30/52 produced
- Assembly: Kopřivnice, Czech Republic (formerly Czechoslovakia)

Body and chassis
- Class: FR layout
- Body style: 2+2; Roadster; Town car; Touring; Pickup

Powertrain
- Engine: 1.7L (1679 cc) Tatra 30 F4 (T30); 1.9L (1911 cc) Tatra 52 F4 (T30/52)
- Transmission: 4-speed manual

Dimensions
- Wheelbase: 2,770 mm (109.1 in); 3,170 mm (124.8 in)
- Length: 3,700 mm (145.7 in); 4,100 mm (161.4 in)
- Width: 1,650 mm (65.0 in)
- Height: 1,650 mm (65.0 in)
- Curb weight: 1,000 kg (2,205 lb)

Chronology
- Predecessor: Tatra 11
- Successor: Tatra 52; Tatra 54

The Tatra 30 is an automobile formerly made by the Czech manufacturer Tatra. It was manufactured between 1926 and 1928. From 1928 to 1931 the car was fitted with a newer engine and is therefore called the Tatra 30/52.

== Design ==
=== Engine ===
==== Tatra 30 ====
The Tatra 30 was powered by an OHV air-cooled four-cylinder boxer engine of 1679 cc, positioned at the front and giving a claimed output of 24 PS (17.6 kW). The maximum speed was around 90 km/h.

==== Tatra 30 Sport ====
The Tatra 30 Sport was powered by an engine of a similar design, but with 1910 cc, which gave it 32–35 PS (23.5–25.7 kW). This version was capable of speeds up to 130 km/h.

==== Tatra 30/52 ====
During the modernization process the "52" engine was fitted. It had 1911 cc and 22 kW (30 PS; 30 hp). This was a transitory mid-version before the production of the successor fully began. It was manufactured for a period of about one year.

The Tatra 30 was gradually modernized until it was replaced by the Tatra 52.

=== Backbone tube ===
Power was delivered to the rear wheels via a four-speed gearbox. The Tatra 30 featured a central backbone chassis, a hallmark of chief designer Ledwinka: the front axle was supported by a transverse leaf spring while a second transverse leaf spring supported the swing rear half-axle. The drive shaft was situated inside the backbone tube. The gearbox and engine are mounted in front of the backbone tube, while the differential is at the rear.

== Versions ==
The Tatra 30 was in the medium size category. Many different versions were made from four seat cabriolets to six seat limousines.

=== Differences from the Tatra 52 ===
- The Tatra 30 has mechanical brakes, while the Tatra 52 has hydraulic ones.
- The Tatra 30 is more angular, especially its fenders. A problem is that during the 1940s to 1960s, many cars were rebuilt, e.g. by the owner replacing a mechanical-brakes undercarriage for one with hydraulic brakes.
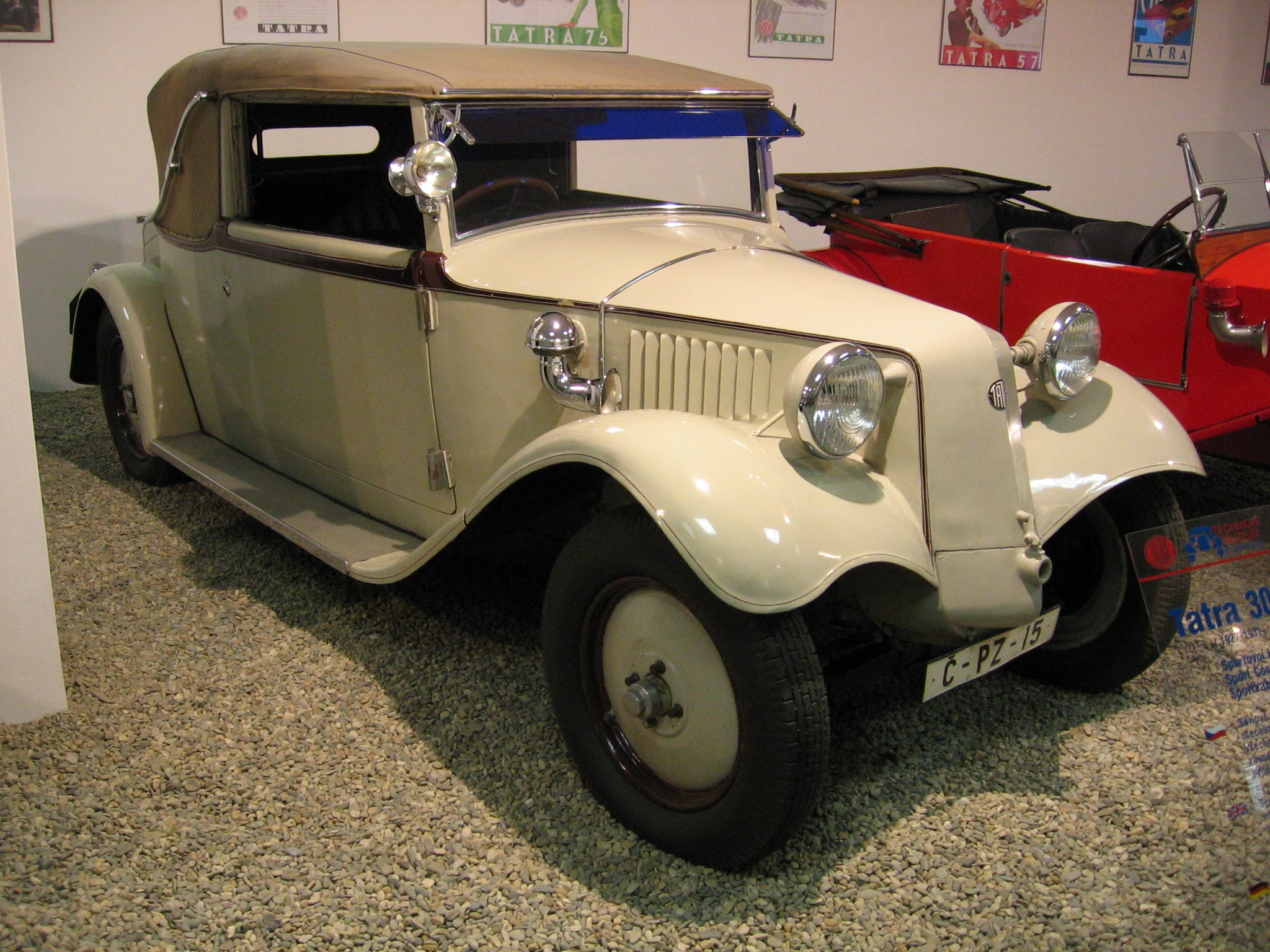
Tatra 30 with Sodomka bodywork

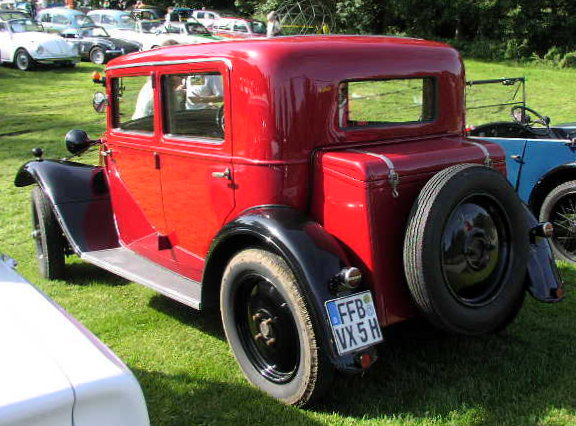
Tatra 30 rear
