= 90th Street =

90th Street may refer to:

- 90th Street – Elmhurst Avenue (IRT Flushing Line), a New York City Subway station
- 90th Street (Manhattan), an east–west street in Manhattan, New York City
