= South Club =

South Korean band

South Club 사우스클럽
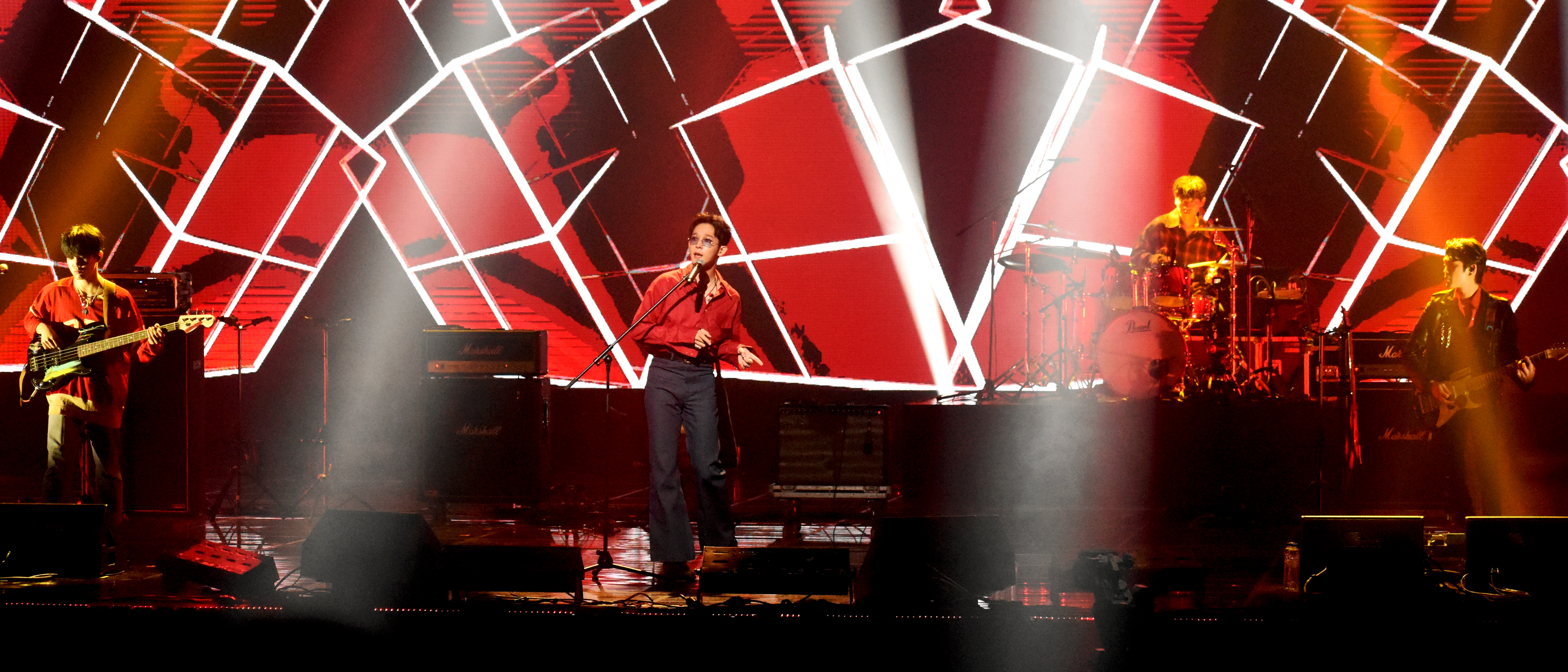
- South Club performing at the 2018 Indiestance Final Concert

Background information
- Origin: Seoul, South Korea
- Genres: Indie pop; alternative rock; indie rock; blues
- Years active: 2017–present
- Labels: P&B
- Members: Nam Tae-hyun; Kang Min-Jun; Lee Dong-Geun; Jung Hoe-Min
- Past members: Kim Eui-myeong; Choi Yun-hee; Jang Won-young; Kang Kun-ku; Nam Dong-hyun
- Website: pnbent.com

South Club (Korean: 사우스클럽) is a South Korean band formed in 2017 by singer Nam Tae-hyun. The band's current line-up consists of four members: leader, vocalist, guitarist, composer and producer Nam Tae-hyun, bassist Jung Hoe-Min, drummer Lee Dong-Geun and guitarist Kang Min-Jun. South Club debuted with the release of their first single, "Hug Me", on May 26, 2017 which was also included in their first EP, 90.

== History ==
=== Formation ===
After Nam Tae-hyun's departure from his previous label on November 25, 2016, he decided to continue to pursue music by forming a band. Tae-hyun then posted a recruitment announcement online, and eventually met his future bandmate Kim Eui-myeong at a church. Kim Eui-myeong then later introduced Nam Tae-hyun to his musician friends Kang Kun-ku, Jang Won-young, and Choi Yun-hee and together they formed a five member band. Besides Tae-hyun who already had some experience in the entertainment industry, Kang Kun-ku and Kim Eui-myeong were former members of a band. Jang Won-young would often help his fellow musician friends

Their first performance was announced by Tae-hyun on his social media on March 25, along with the name of the band, "South Club". The formation of the band was then made official and Nam Tae-hyun established a music company called "South Buyers Club" under his name, in order to pursue the musical style that he likes. Tae-hyun then became the leader and main composer, while all the members help with the arrangement adding their own style to the songs.

=== 2017: The beginning, 90 ===
South Club debuted on May 26, 2017, with their first single "Hug Me", a melancholy song that expresses people’s loneliness. Their first single received a good response from fans and other fellow artists and from there the band started to perform at many events and festivals. On June 18, South Club had their first official public stage at the music festival "Smile, Love, Weekend", where they gave an album preview and played the songs they have prepared for their first EP. Their first seven-track EP 90 was released on June 27. South Club described their music style as alternative rock with blues as the foundation. Along with the album release, they also released three music videos. "Dirty House" (더러운 집), "I Got the Blues", and "Liar". They spoke about freedom and youth throughout their songs. Their music is heavily inspired by rock bands in the 90's, such as Nirvana.

On July 8, the band released their second single "NO" and the accompanying music video was uploaded on South Club’s official YouTube account.

Later that year, Choi Yun-hee wasn't seen performing together with South Club. On September 16, 2017, Nam Tae-hyun announced that they would continue as a four member band from then on and that Choi Yun-hee had left the band for personal reasons.

They then proceeded to have more live performances and guerilla concerts around South Korea. They then started to reach out to their fans from overseas and prepared Music Fan Meetings in Tokyo, Bangkok, and Taipei, where they have received a warm response. On November 18 and 19, South Club held their first official solo concert curated by Kim Tae-won at the Hyundai Card Understage, in Seoul, with the appearances of 10cm, Heize, and Nam Dong-hyun as their guests.

Their third single "누굴 위한 노래인가요 (Who Is This Song For?)" was released through digital music websites on December 5. The song itself was based on Nam Tae-hyun's personal love story. He admitted that at first it was supposed to be a warm love song, but that after his lover left him, he rewrote the song to describe his feelings of getting lost.

South Club's official logo

=== 2018–present: South Club's Europe tour & Japan tour, 20 and other plans ===
At the start of 2018, Tae-hyun announced on his radio show that South Club would be touring across Europe, visiting London, Paris, Cologne, and Madrid in April.

On January 27, the band hosted their first Music Fan Meeting of the year in Hong Kong, where they shot a music video for their upcoming album.

A few weeks later, South Buyers Club announced that South Club's bassist Kim Eui-myeong left the band for personal reasons. The band uploaded a video saying that they have a new bassist taking his place. On February 18, South Club performed at the Rolling Hall 23rd Anniversary Concert along with their new bassist Nam Dong-hyun.

On March 28, 2018, South Buyers Club revealed that South Club will be touring in several places in Japan.

== Band members ==
Current members

- Nam Tae-hyun (남태현) – vocalist, composer, lyricist, guitarist
- Jung Hoe-Min (정회민) – bassist
- Kang Min-Jun (강민준) – guitarist
- Lee Dong-Geun (이동근) – drummer

Former members

- Jang Won-young (장원영) – drummer
- Kang Kun-ku (강건구) – guitarist
- Kim Eui-myeong (김의명) – bassist
- Choi Yun-hee (최윤희) – keyboardist
- Nam Dong-hyun (남동현) – bassist

== Discography ==
=== Extended plays ===
| Title | Album details | Peak chart positions | Sales |
| Title | Album details | KOR | Sales |
|---|---|---|---|
| 90 | Released: June 27, 2017; Label: South Buyers Club, NHN Entertainment; Formats: CD, digital download | 4 | KOR: 5,155+ |
| 20 | Released: May 30, 2018; Label: South Buyers Club, Stone Music Entertainment; Formats: CD, digital download | 14 | KOR: 2,664+ |
| Contact Information | Released: October 24, 2018; Label: South Buyers Club; Formats: CD, digital download | 25 | —N/a |

=== Single albums ===
| Title | Album details | Peak chart positions | Sales |
| Title | Album details | KOR | Sales |
|---|---|---|---|
| Twice (두 번) | Released: November 15, 2019; Label: P&B Entertainment, Kakao M; Formats: CD, digital download, streaming | 32 | KOR: 1,889 |

=== Singles ===
| Title | Year | Peak chart positions | Album |
| Title | Year | KOR | Album |
|---|---|---|---|
| "Hug Me" | 2017 | — | 90 |
| "No" (아니) | 2017 | — | Non-album singles |
| "Who’s This Song For?" (누굴 위한 노래인가요) | 2017 | — | Non-album singles |
| "Outcast" | 2018 | — | 20 |
| "I'm Crazy" | 2018 | — | Contact Information |
| "Twice" | 2019 | — | Twice |
| "To My Friends" | 2020 | — | Non-album singles |
| "Rock Star" | 2020 | — | Non-album singles |
| "Star Dust" | 2021 | — | Non-album singles |

=== Music videos ===
| Year | Title | Album |
|---|---|---|
| 2017 | "Hug Me" | 90 |
| 2017 | "Dirty House" | 90 |
| 2017 | "I Got The Blues" | 90 |
| 2017 | "Liar" | 90 |
| 2017 | "No" | Non-album single |
| 2018 | "왕따 (Outcast)" | 20 |
| 2019 | "두번 (Twice)" | Twice |

== Tours and concerts ==
| Year | Tour Name | Dates | | Concerts | Tour Date |
| Year | Tour Name | Start | End | Concerts | Tour Date |
|---|---|---|---|---|---|
| 2017 | South Club the 1st Concert | November 18 (Hyundai Card Understage) | November 19 (Hyundai Card Understage) | 2 | Location: 1. 18 November (Hyundai Card Understage) Seoul; 2. 19 November (Hyundai Card Understage) Seoul |
| 2018 | South Club 1st FanMeeting in Europe | April 20 (Underworld Camden) | April 29 (Die Kantine) | 4 | Location: 1. 20 April (Underworld Camden) London, England; 2. 23 April (Sala But) Madrid, Spain; 3. 27 April (Le Trabendo) Paris, France; 4. 29 April (Die Kantine) Cologne, Germany |
| 2018 | Summer Memory: South Club 1st Japan Tour | June 20 (amHALL) | June 23 (Shinjuku Loft) | 3 | Location: 1. 20 June (amHall) Osaka; 2. 21 June (ElectricLadyLand Aichi; 3. 23 June (Shinjuku Loft) Tokyo(2 shows) |
