= Tatra 82 =

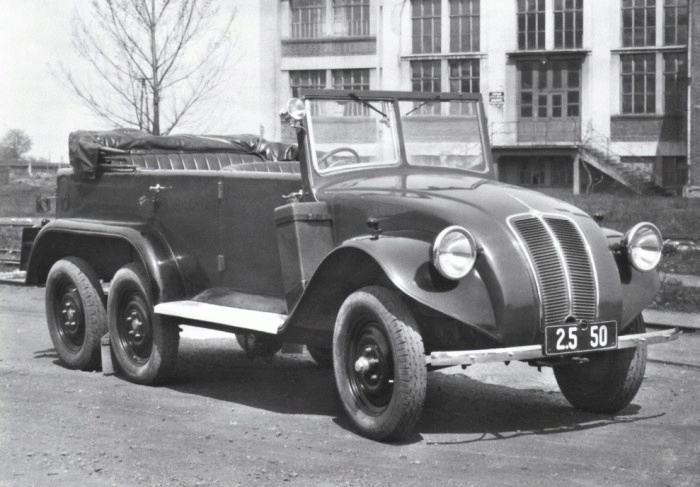

Overview
- Manufacturer: Tatra
- Production: 1935-1938; 325 produced

Body and chassis
- Class: Truck
- Body style: Conventional

Powertrain
- Engine: 2.5L Tatra 82 F4 (T82); 3.0L Tatra 87 V8 (T82/87)
- Transmission: 4-speed manual + 2-speed gearbox

Chronology
- Predecessor: Tatra 72
- Successor: Tatra 92

The Tatra 82 was a heavy-duty car model made by Czech manufacturer Tatra between 1935 and 1938. It was mainly used for military cargo and personnel.

The vehicle had an air-cooled OHC four-cylinder boxer engine with 2490 cc and 55 hp (41 kW) power. The car had 3 axles, of which both back axles were driven. It had 8 forward gears and 1 reverse gear. The maximum attainable speed of the 3,150 kg (6,945 lb) car was 65 km/h (40 mph). It was based on the Tatra backbone chassis conception.

In two years, a total of 325 vehicles produced. The last specimens had the V8 engine of the Tatra 87 and increased to 4,000 kg (8,818 lb) in total weight.
