= 90th Regiment =

90th Regiment or 90th Infantry Regiment may refer to:

- 90th Regiment of Foot (Yorkshire Volunteers), a unit of the British Army, 1779-1784
- 90th Regiment of Foot (Perthshire Volunteers), a unit of the British Army
- 90th Armoured Regiment (India), a unit of the Indian Army
- Royal Winnipeg Rifles, was first raised as the 90th Winnipeg Battalion of Rifles in 1883
- 90th Infantry Regiment (United States), a unit of the United States Army

American Civil War

- 90th Illinois Volunteer Infantry Regiment, a unit of the Union (North) Army during the American Civil War
- 90th New York Volunteer Infantry Regiment, a unit of the Union (Northern) Army
- 90th Ohio Infantry, a unit of the Union (Northern) Army
- 90th Pennsylvania Infantry, a unit of the Union (Northern) Army

== See also ==
- 90th Division (disambiguation)
- 90 Squadron (disambiguation)
