= Tatra 13 =

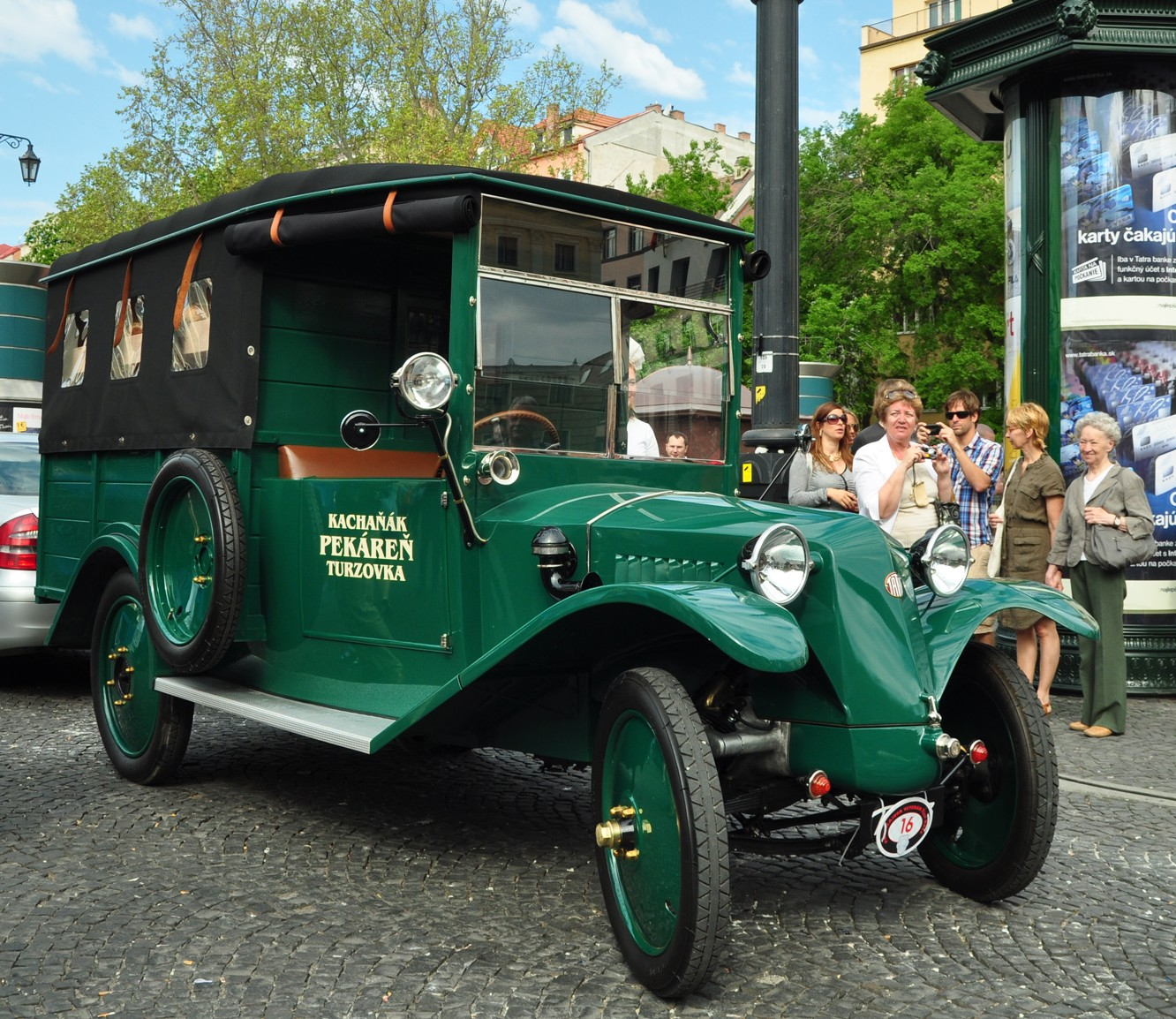

Overview
- Manufacturer: Tatra
- Production: 1924-1933; 762 produced
- Assembly: Kopřivnice, Moravia, Czechoslovakia

Body and chassis
- Class: small truck
- Layout: FR layout

Powertrain
- Engine: 1.1L Tatra 11 air-cooled flat-twin (1924-1926); 1.1L Tatra 12 air-cooled flat-twin (1926-1933)
- Transmission: 4-speed manual

Dimensions
- Wheelbase: 2,646 mm (104.2 in)
- Curb weight: 800–1,200 kg (1,800–2,600 lb)

The Tatra 13 is a vintage truck made by Czech manufacturer Tatra. It was manufactured between 1924 and 1933. The Tatra 13 can be considered one of the first utility vehicles designed, constructed, and mass produced by Tatra.

The truck was derived from model Tatra 11, with which it shared components and differed from it by strengthened rear axle. Initially the front wheels didn't have brakes. As Tatra 11 was succeeded by Tatra 12 (1926), the truck underwent modernization, which among other things brought it brakes to all four wheels.

== Design ==
=== Engine ===
The Tatra 13 initially used the engine from the Tatra 11, and later (since 1926) was manufactured with the Tatra 12 engine. It is a four-stroke, spark ignition, two-cylinder air-cooled boxer engine, with a capacity of 1057 cc and power of about 10 kilowatts (13 hp) at 2800 rpm.

The gearbox had four speeds (+reverse).

=== Chassis ===
The initial chassis was derived from Tatra 11, while later from Tatra 12.

The front axle is stiff, suspended by transverse half-elliptic spring, carried by the aluminium engine block, while the rear axle consists of two independent swinging half-axles, suspended by a transverse half-elliptic spring, which is mounted on top of the differential box and leaning its ends against the brake plates. The advantage of this solution is excellent progressiveness of the suspension.

== Versions ==
The vehicle weighed about 1000 kg while it had payload of 800–1200 kg depending on version.

Tatra 13 was offered foremost as a small truck, however also buses were derived from it. It differs from Tatra 11 and 12 not only by the carrossery, but also by use of larger wheels at the rear.
