= Tatra 49 =

Vintage motor vehicle

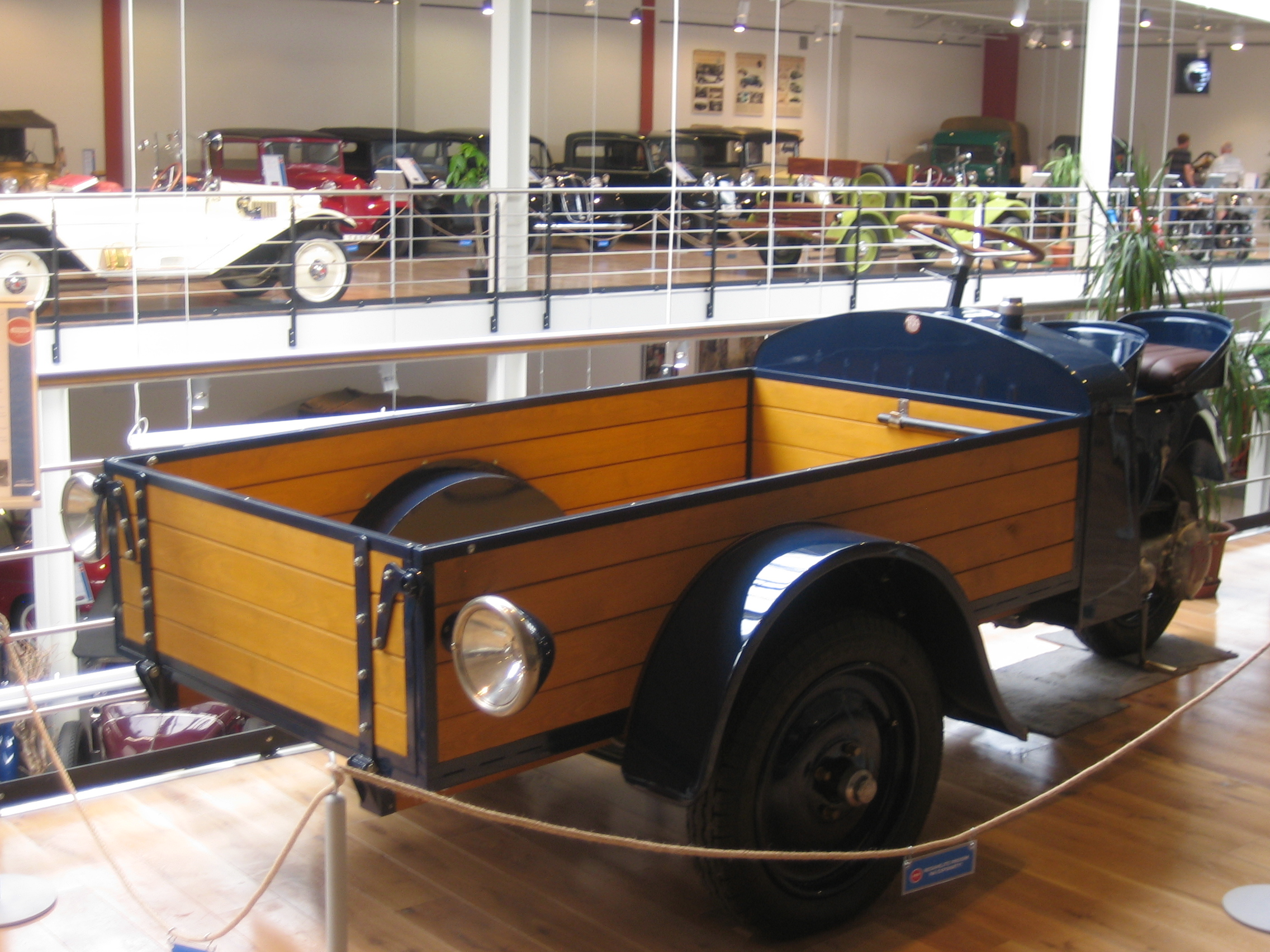
- View from the front

Overview
- Manufacturer: Tatra
- Production: 1929-1939; about 200 produced
- Assembly: Kopřivnice, Moravia, Czechoslovakia

Powertrain
- Engine: 529 cc Tatra 49 single-cylinder (based on T12 engine)
- Transmission: 3-speed manual

Dimensions
- Wheelbase: 2,265 mm (89.2 in)
- Curb weight: about 500 kg (1,100 lb) depending on version

The Tatra 49 is a model of vintage three-wheeled motor vehicle made by Czech manufacturer Tatra.

It was developed with an aim to offer a reliable commercial car at the lowest possible cost. It shared some parts with the Tatra 12 and Tatra 30. However the motor tricycle wasn't a commercial success and only about 200 of them were made from 1929 to 1930. Other sources claim that about 210 were produced: 97 in 1930, nine in 1931, another four in 1932, and about 100 between 1934 and 1939.

A few cars of the type also had a body shell similar to the one used by the Tatra 12.

== Design ==
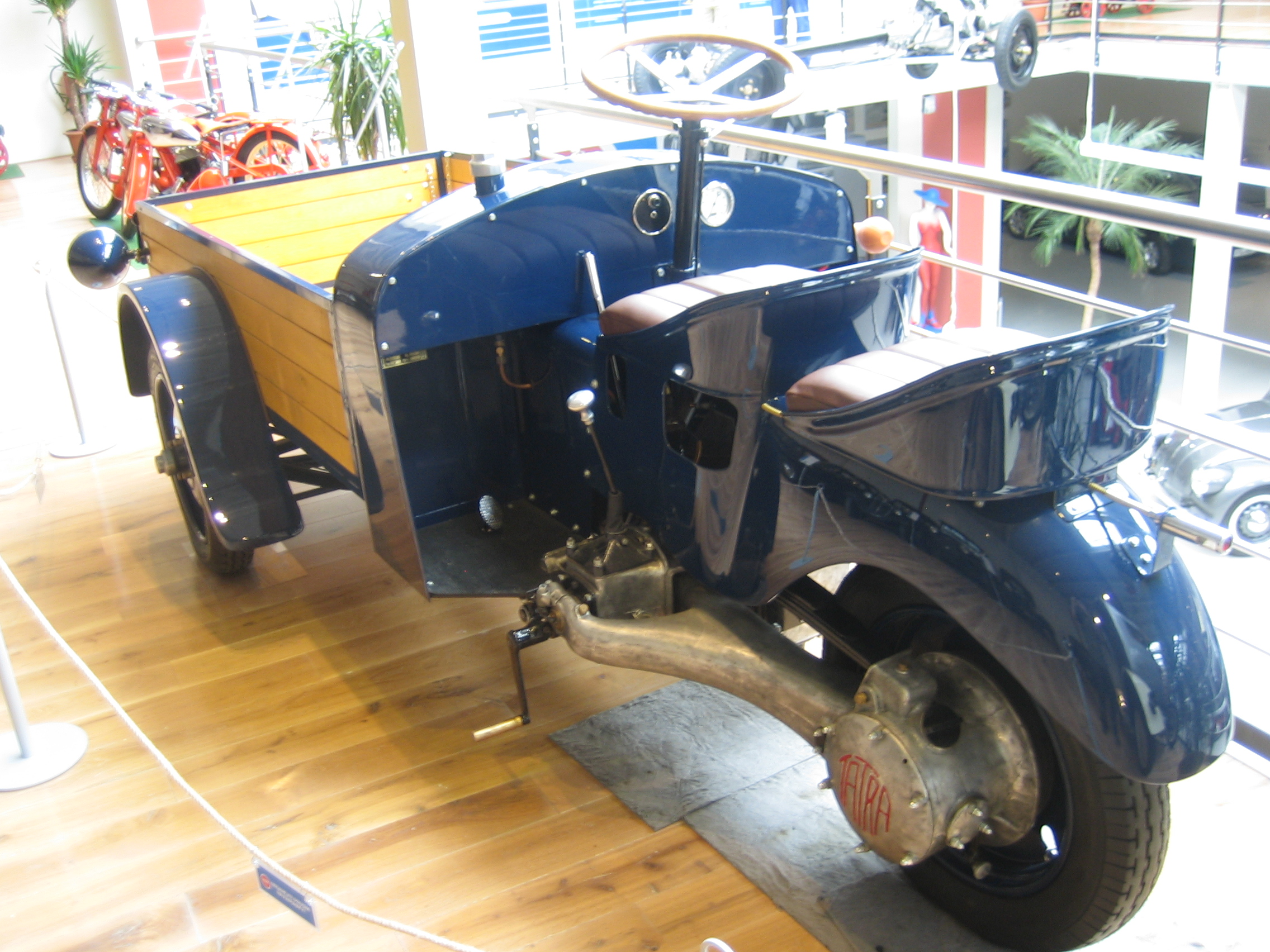
Tatra 49 rear

=== Engine ===
The car had Tatra 49 engine. This was a four stroke, spark ignition, air cooled, single-cylinder petrol engine based on that of the Tatra 12 (basically being a Tatra 12 engine cut in half). The engine had a power output of 5 kW (7 PS; 7 hp) at 2,501 rpm with a displacement of 529 cc (32 cu in).

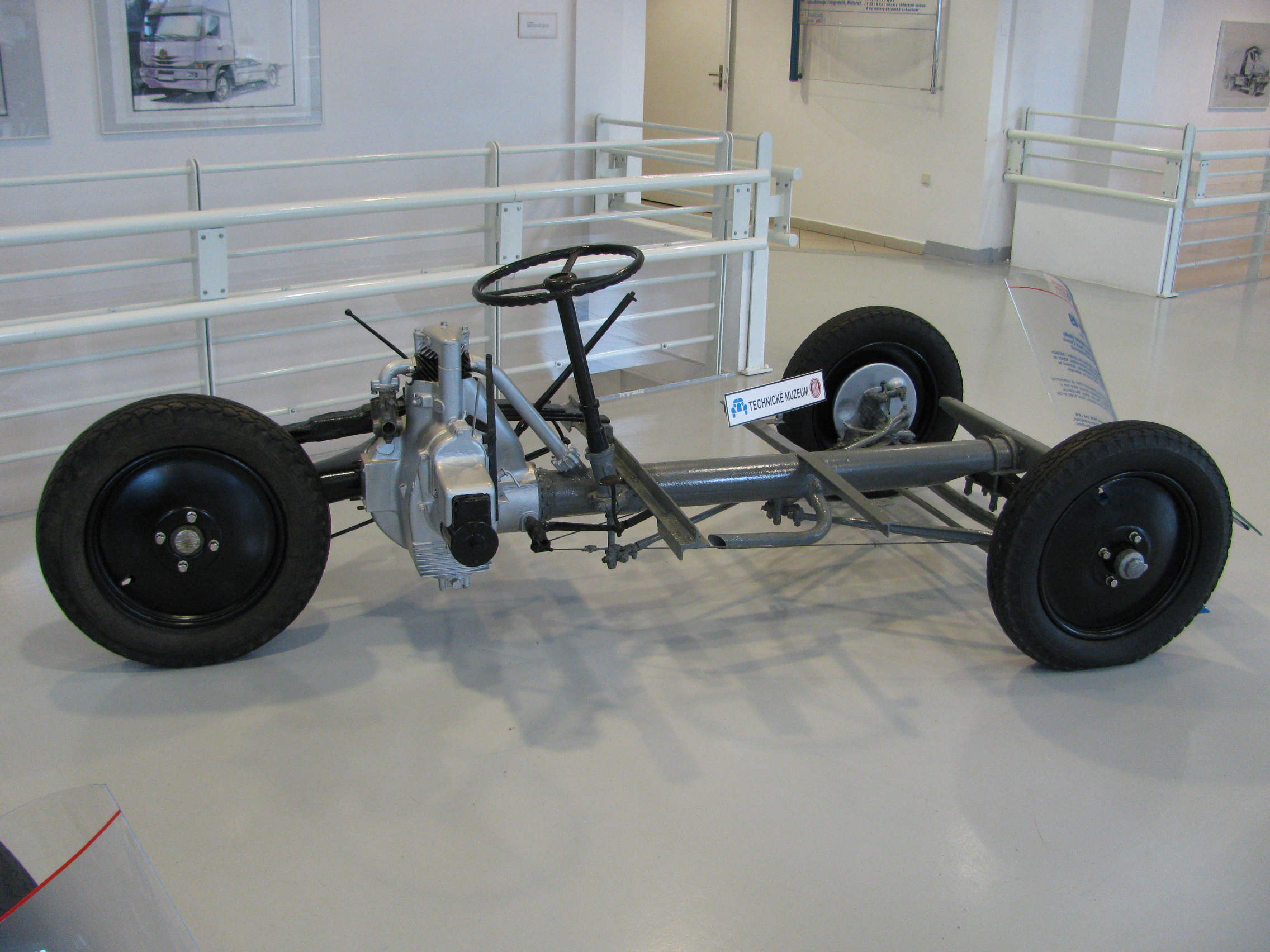
The chassis of a Tatra 49

=== Chassis ===
The central backbone tube chassis is supported by a stiff front axle taken from a Tatra 30, while the engine and transmission box are bolted to the rear end. The freight version uses the central chassis tube as an exhaust muffler, while the personal motor car version has an extra standard exhaust muffler. Only the rear wheel is driven. The chassis weights 325 kg (717 lb).
