= Tatra 57 =

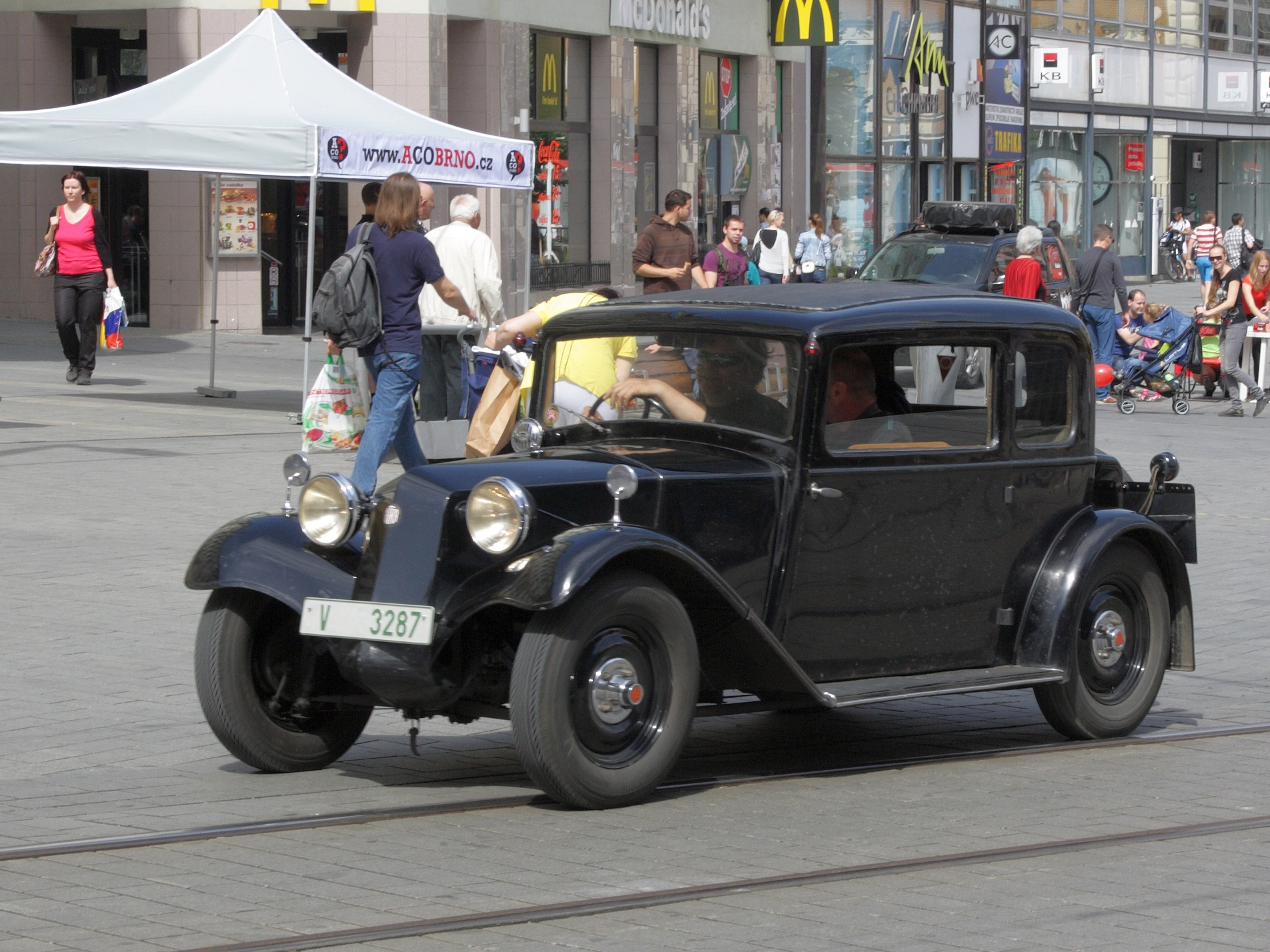

Overview
- Manufacturer: Závody Tatra
- Production: 1932–1949; T 57: 1932–36; T 57A: 1936–38; T 57B: 1938–49

Body and chassis
- Class: compact car
- Body style: two-door sedan, convertible or coupé
- Layout: FR layout
- Chassis: backbone chassis
- Related: Austro-Tatra 57 L

Powertrain
- Engine: 1,155 cc Tatra 57 H4 (T57); 1,155 cc Tatra 57a H4 (T57A); 1,256 cc Tatra 57b H4 (T57B)
- Transmission: 4-speed manual

Dimensions
- Length: 3,500 mm (137.8 in)
- Width: 1,500 mm (59.1 in)
- Height: 1,500 mm (59.1 in)
- Curb weight: 730 kg (1,609 lb)

Chronology
- Predecessor: Tatra 12

The Tatra 57 are a series of two-door compact cars, built by Czechoslovak company Tatra from 1932. They are popularly known by the nickname "Hadimrška".

Tatra updated the model as the 57A in 1936, and as 57B in 1938. A military adaptation, the 57K (for Kübelwagen), was introduced in 1941. Through 1945, more than 5,000 Tatra Kübelwagens were built.

All versions have a characteristic Tatra backbone chassis, with the drive-shaft running encased in its central structural tube.

Tatra ended production of the 57K in 1947, and of the 57B in 1949. With that the company altogether withdrew from making compact cars; from 1948 its smallest model was the 2 litre Tatra 600.

== History ==
=== Tatra 57 ===
The Tatra type 57, introduced in 1931, succeeded the Tatra 12. Styling continued the same streamlined, closed nose front as its predecessors – Type 11 and 12. It has a 1,155 cc overhead valve flat-four engine that produces 18 PS (13 kW). Its fuel consumption is between eight and 10 litres per 100 km. Bodies offered included a four-seat saloon, four-seat convertible and two-seat convertible. All were two-door.

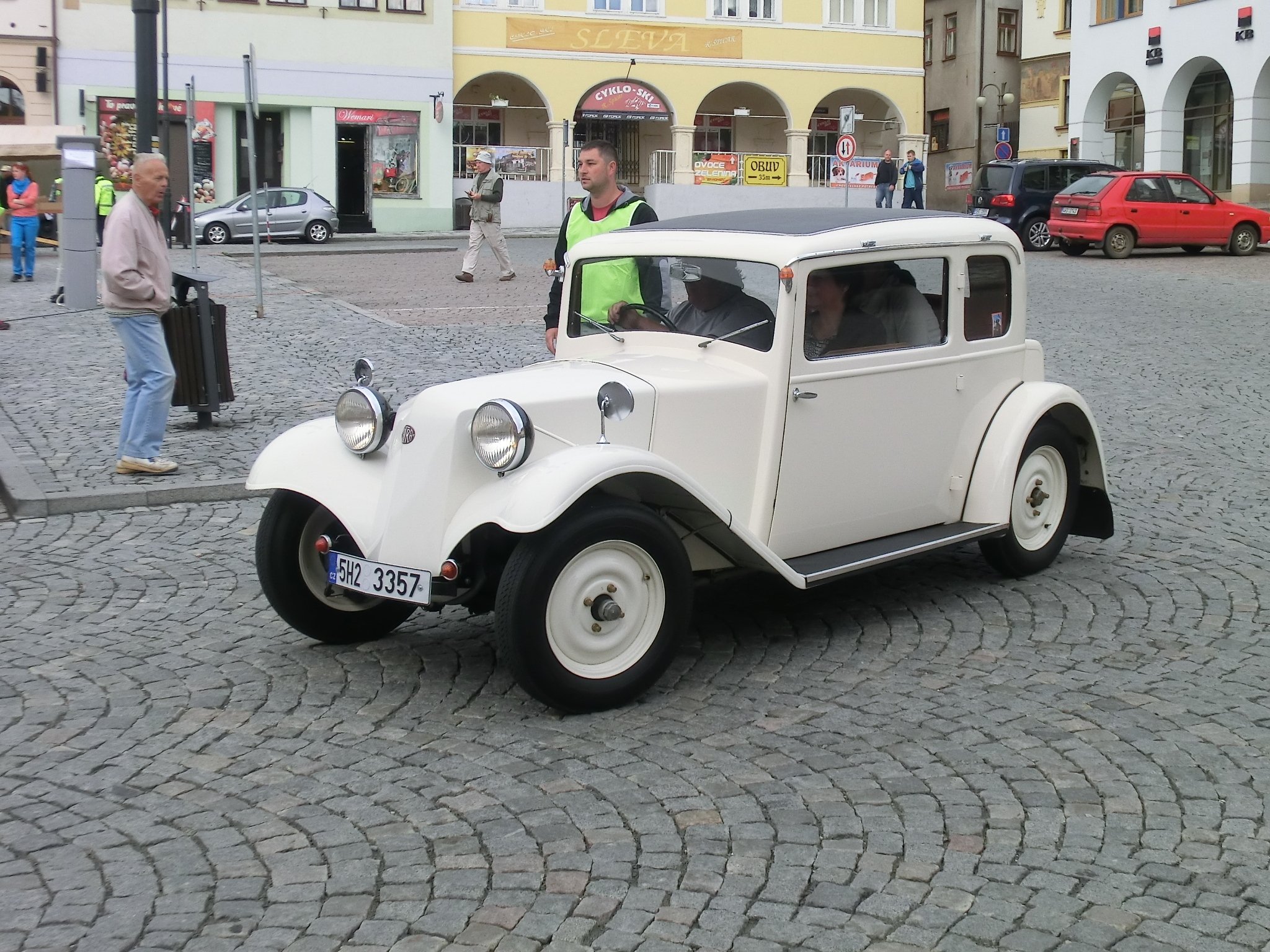
White Tatra 57

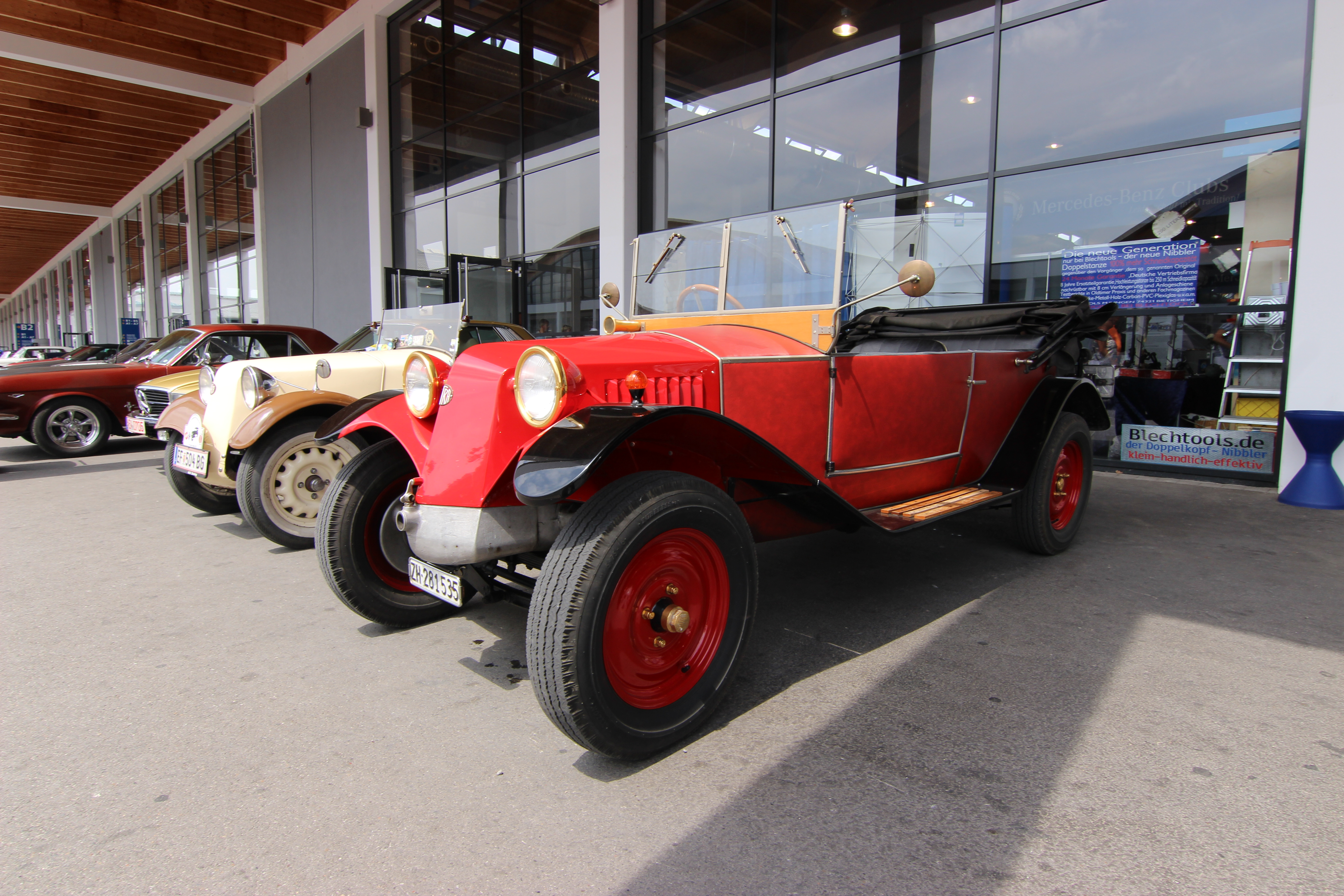
Tatra 57 convertible

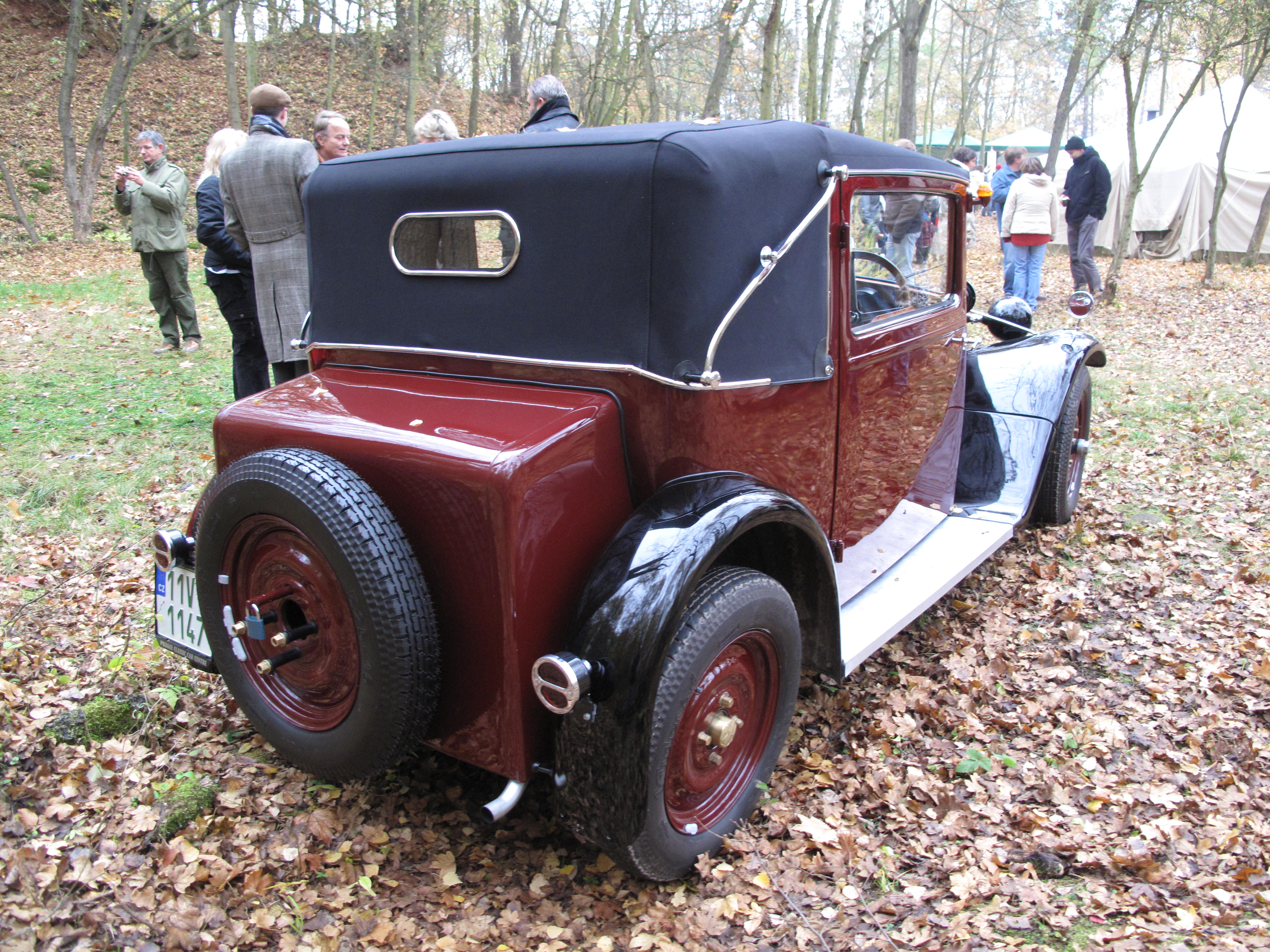
Tatra 57 rear

=== Tatra 57A ===
In 1935 Tatra replaced the Type 57 with the 57A – changing to a more conventional open front grille design. The 1,155 cc engine's power output was increased to 20 PS (15 kW). The body was restyled, and given a radiator grille similar to that of the larger Tatra 75. A commercial van version was offered. In 1937, a military version of the 57A with a fabric roof and doors would be manufactured and exported to the Republic of China.

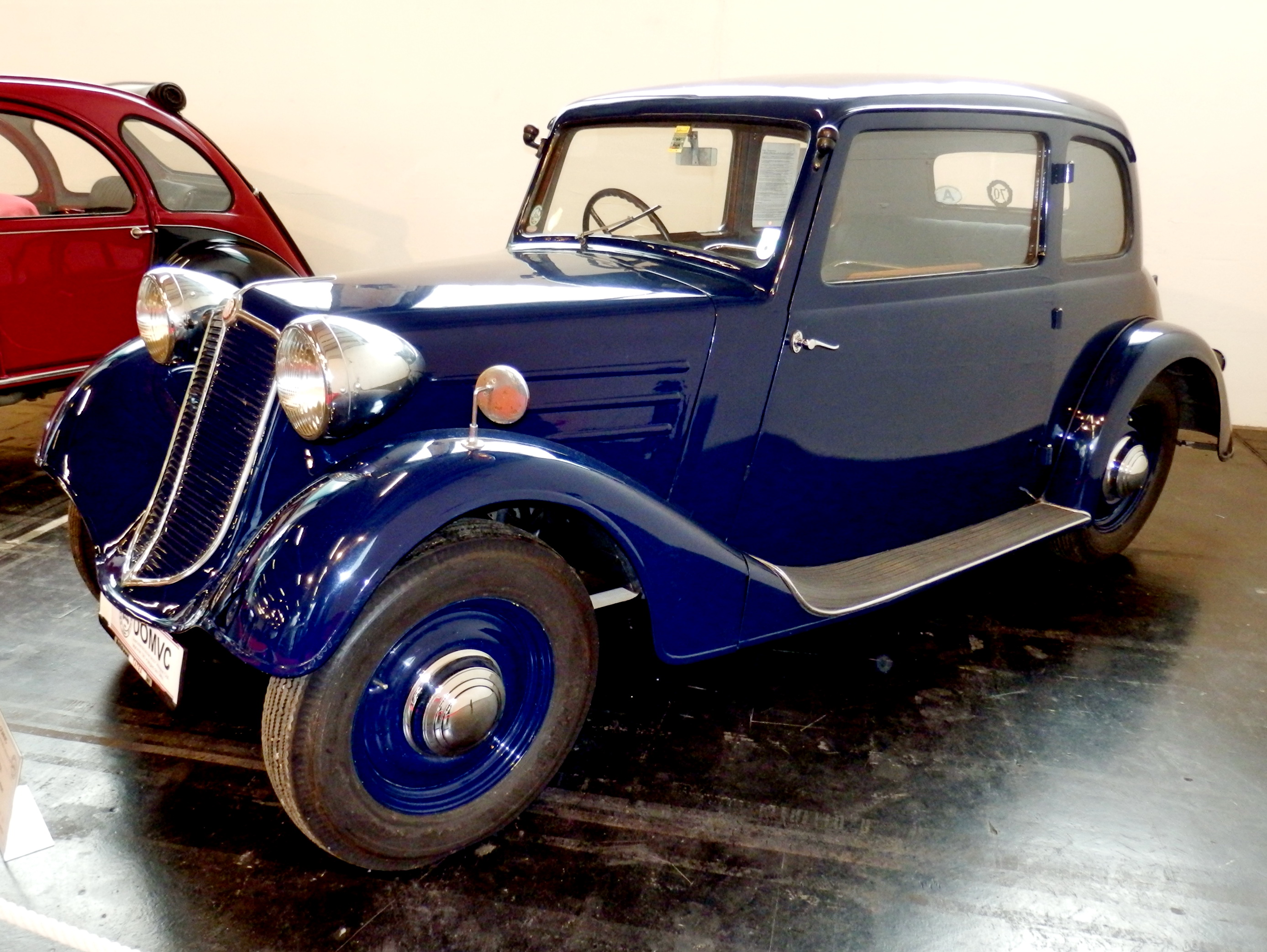
Tatra 57A

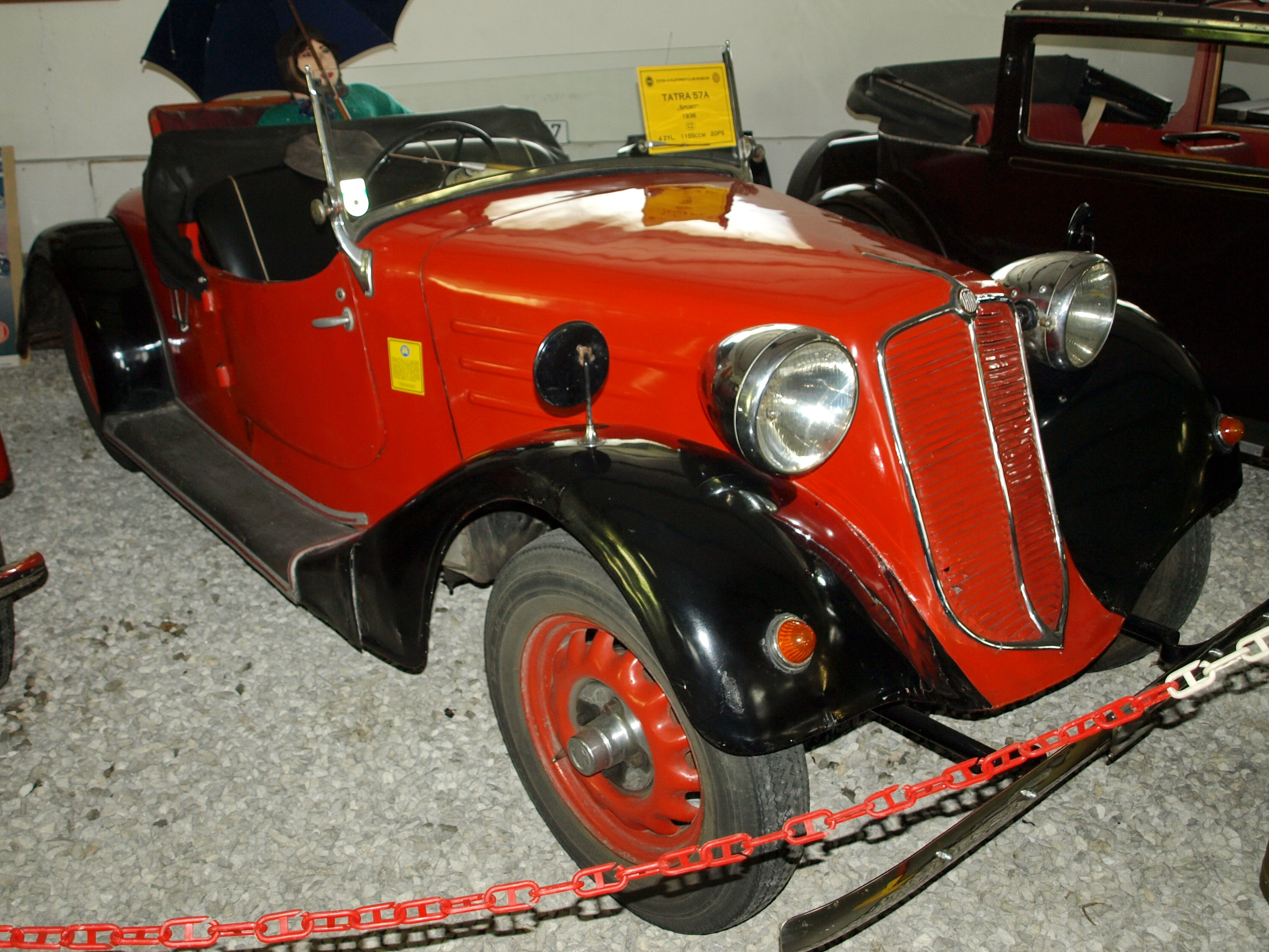
Tatra 57A convertible

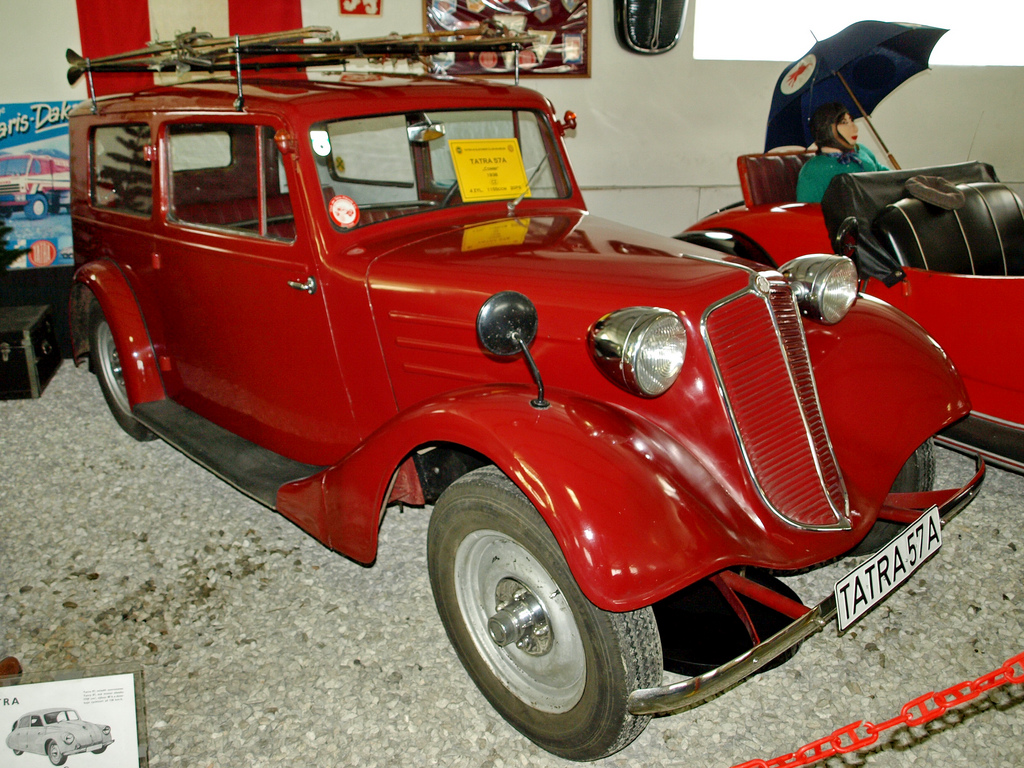
Tatra 57A combi

=== Tatra 57B ===
In 1938 Tatra replaced the Type 57A with the 57B. For the new model Tatra enlarged the engine to 1,256 cc and increased its power to 25 PS (18 kW).

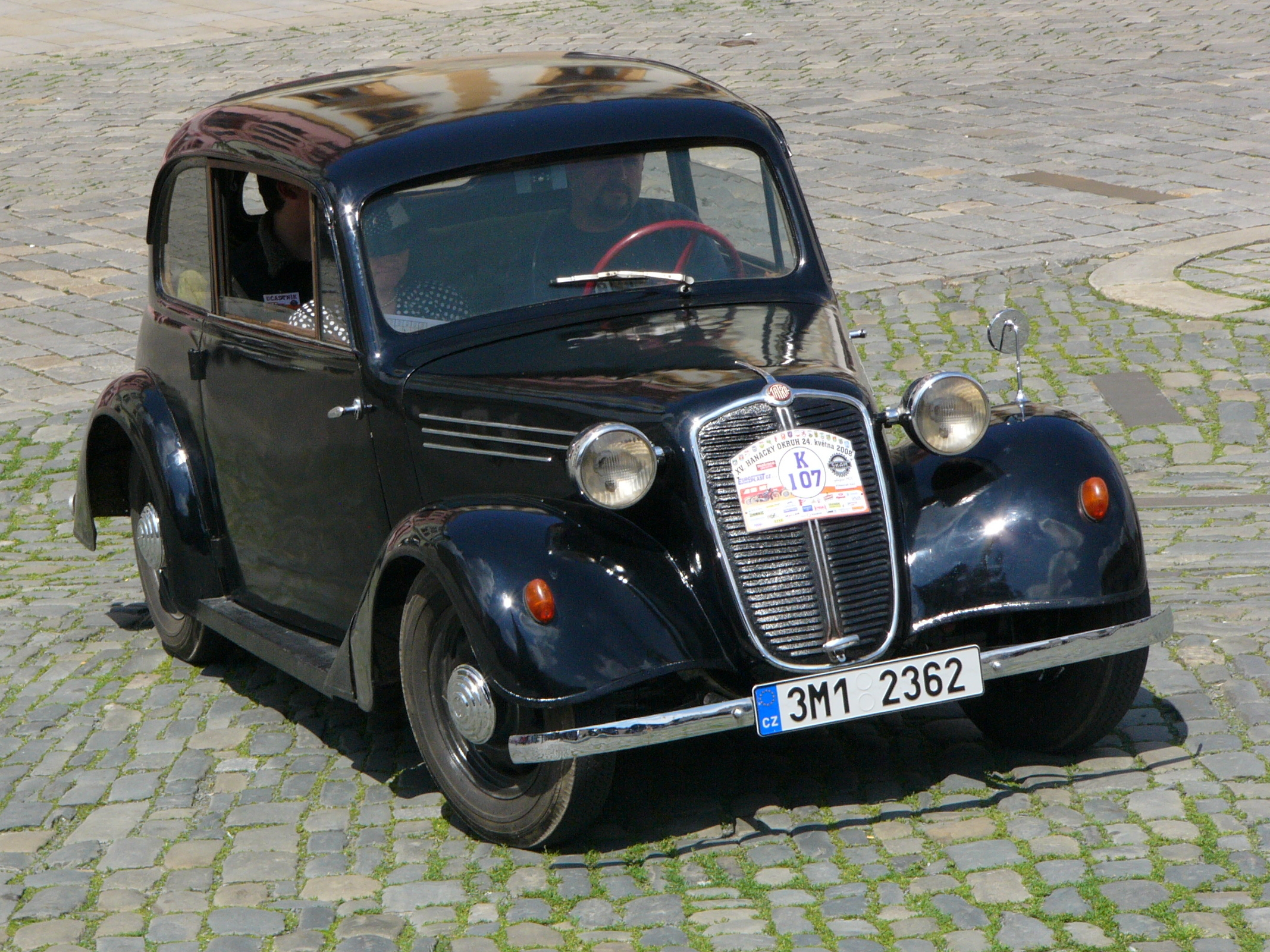
Tatra 57B

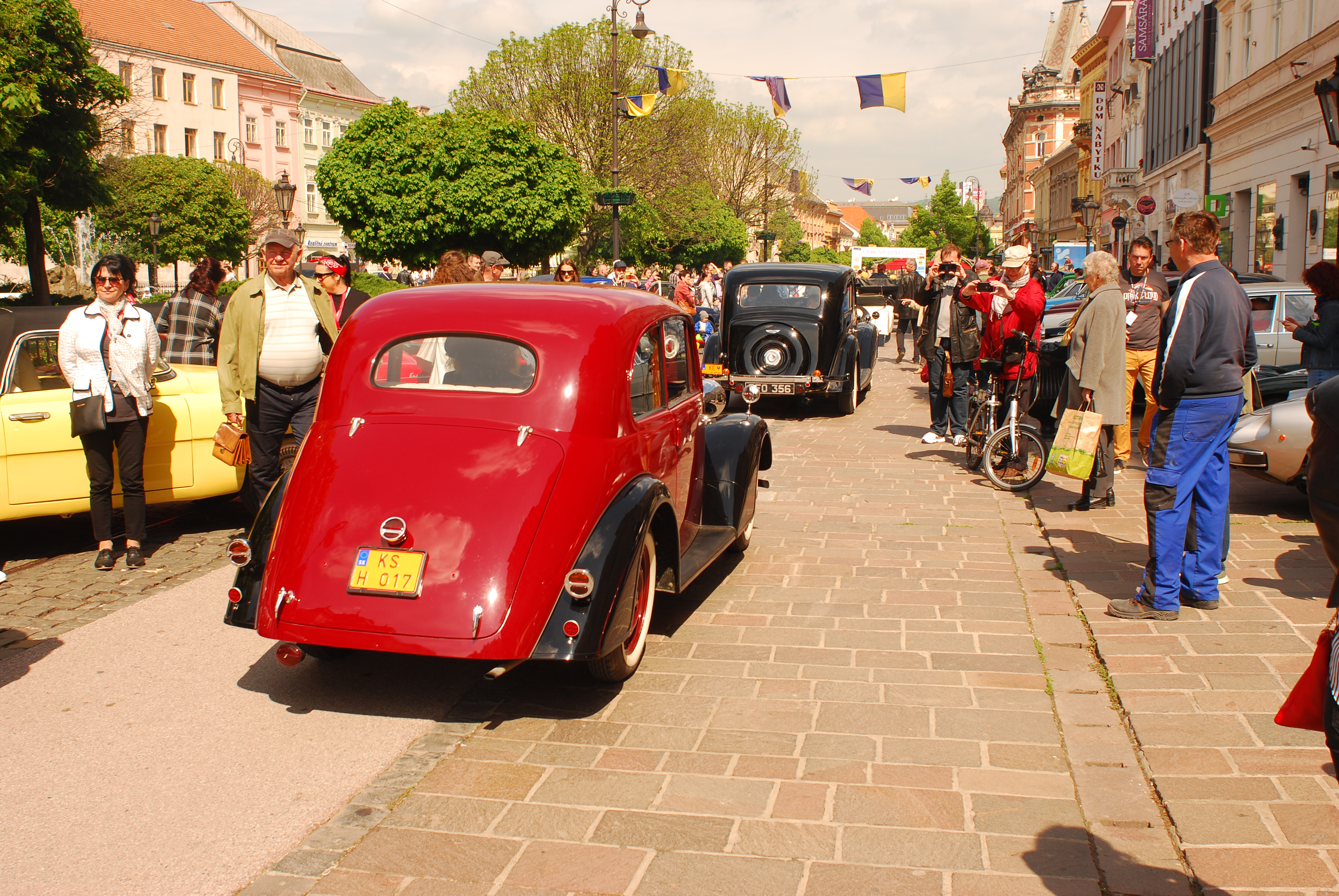
Tatra 57B rear

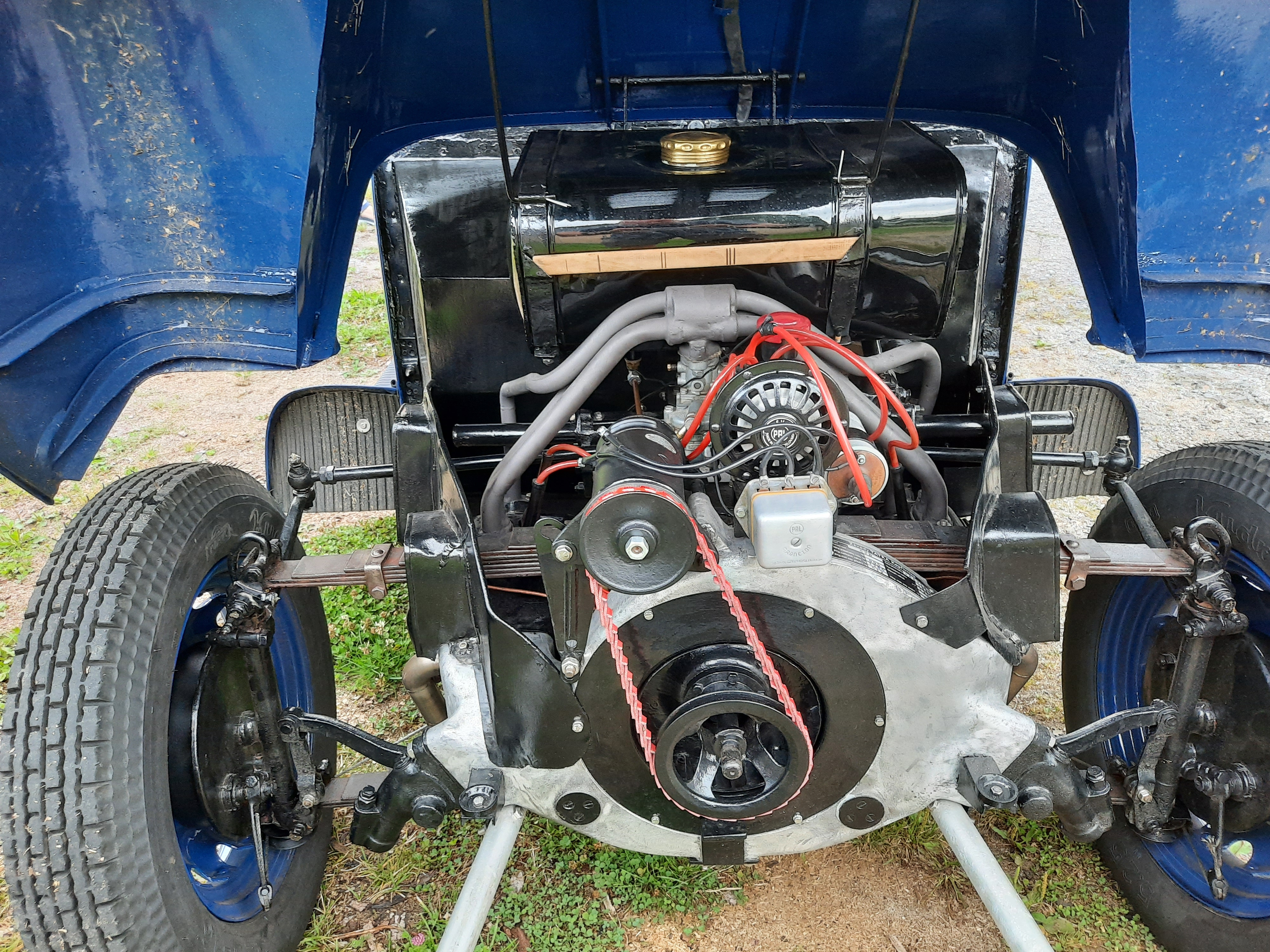
Tatra 57B flat four engine

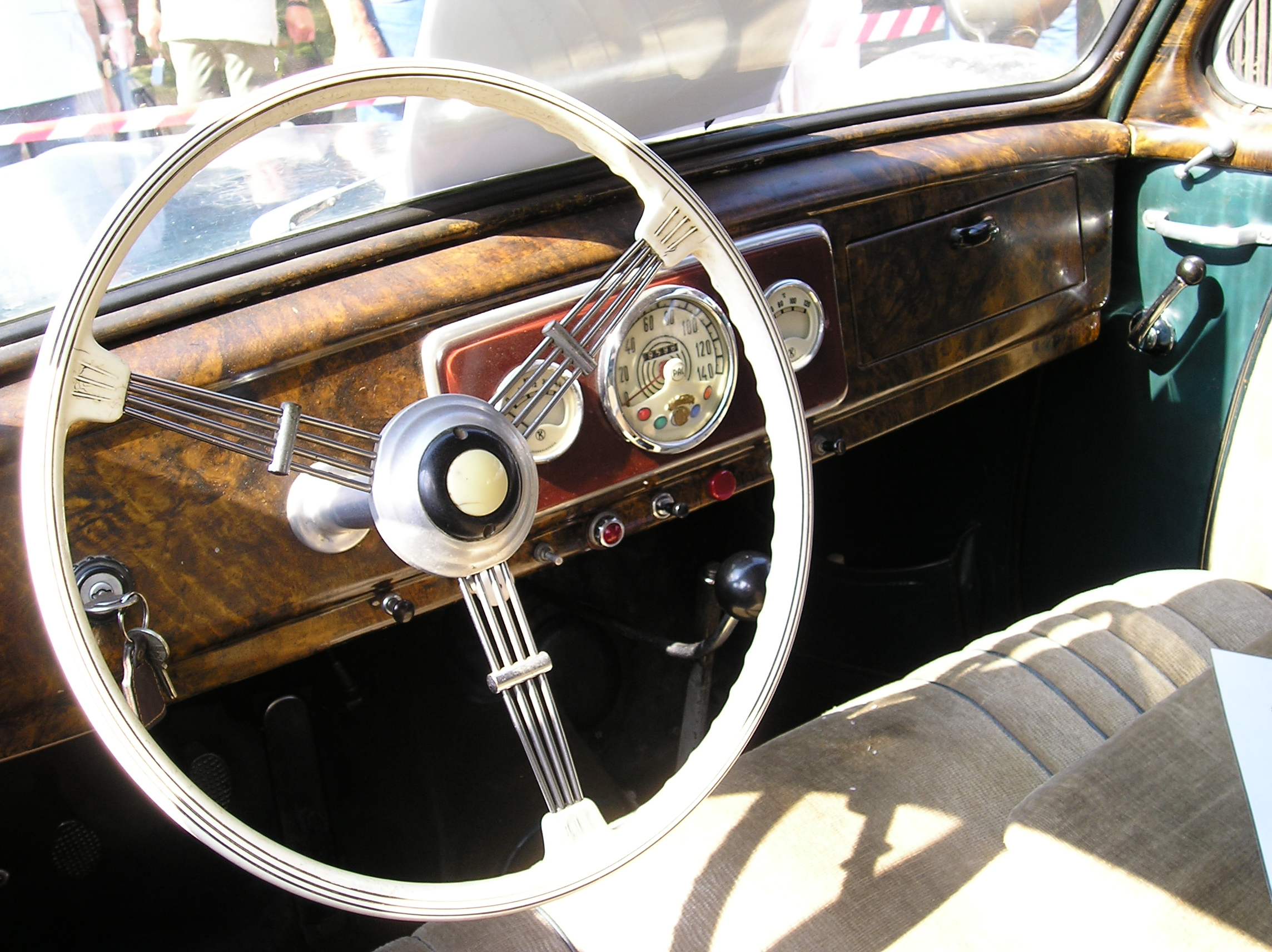
Tatra 57B interior

=== Tatra 57K ===
Tatra 57 K
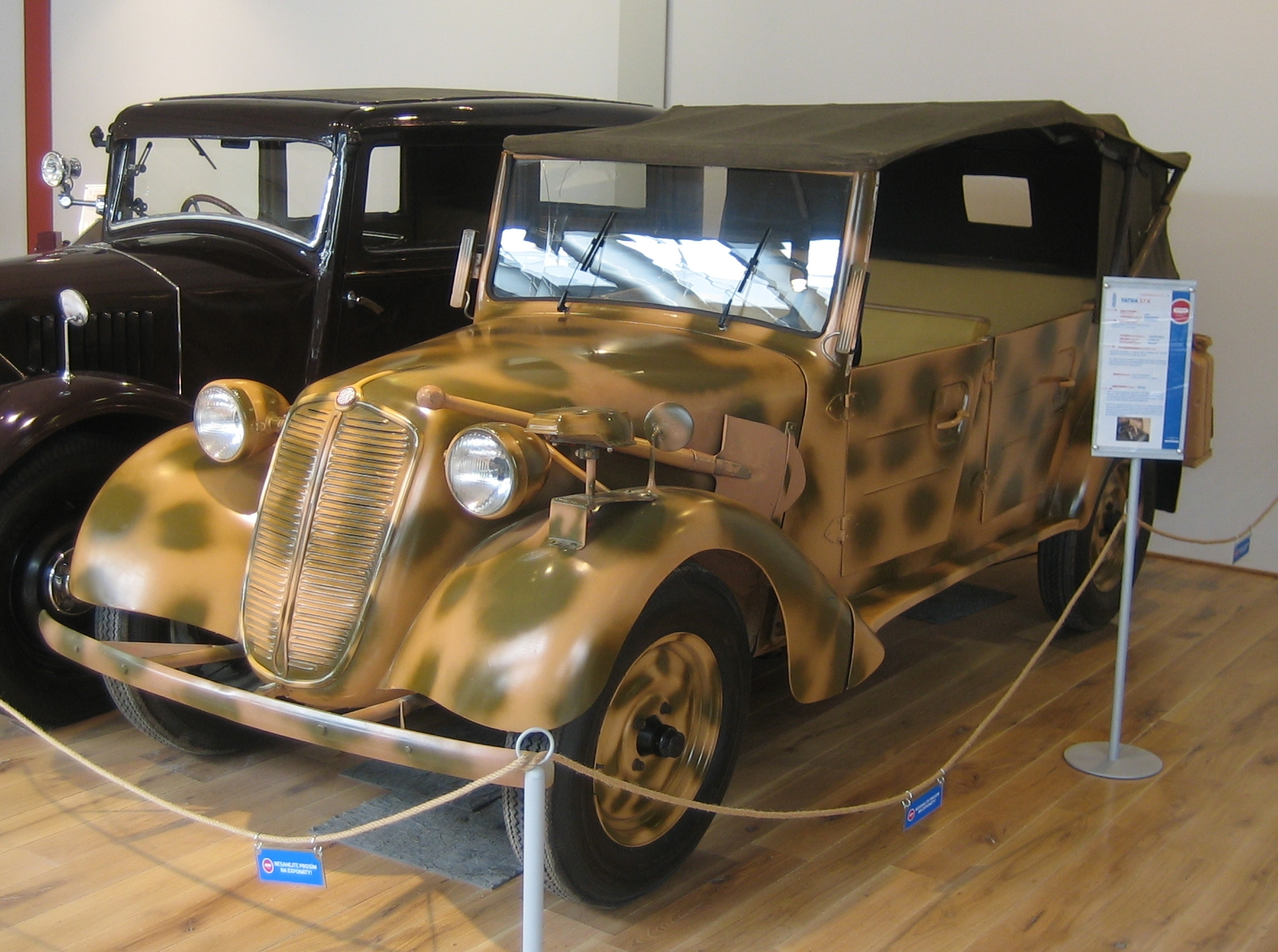

Overview
- Manufacturer: Závody Tatra
- Production: 1941–1947

Body and chassis
- Class: compact car
- Body style: 4-door convertible
- Chassis: backbone chassis

Powertrain
- Engine: 1,256 cc (77 cu in) air-cooled flat-four (petrol)
- Transmission: 4-speed manual

Dimensions
- Wheelbase: 2,550 mm (100.4 in)
- Length: 3,980 mm (156.7 in)
- Width: 1,550 mm (61.0 in)
- Height: 1,690 mm (66.5 in)
- Curb weight: 870 kg (1,918 lb)

In 1941, Tatra added the 57K Kübelwagen, which was a military four-door convertible for the German Wehrmacht in World War II, officially designated as "Leichter Personenkraftwagen" (le. Pkw.) Tatra 57K. It was constructed on the Germans' specifications, with increased ground clearance and a 1,256 cc engine, detuned to 23 PS (17 kW).

From 1941 to 1945, Tatra manufactured 5,415 units of the Tatra T 57 K, which were frequently used by Nazi police forces. Production of this model further continued through 1947.

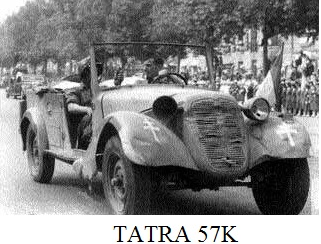

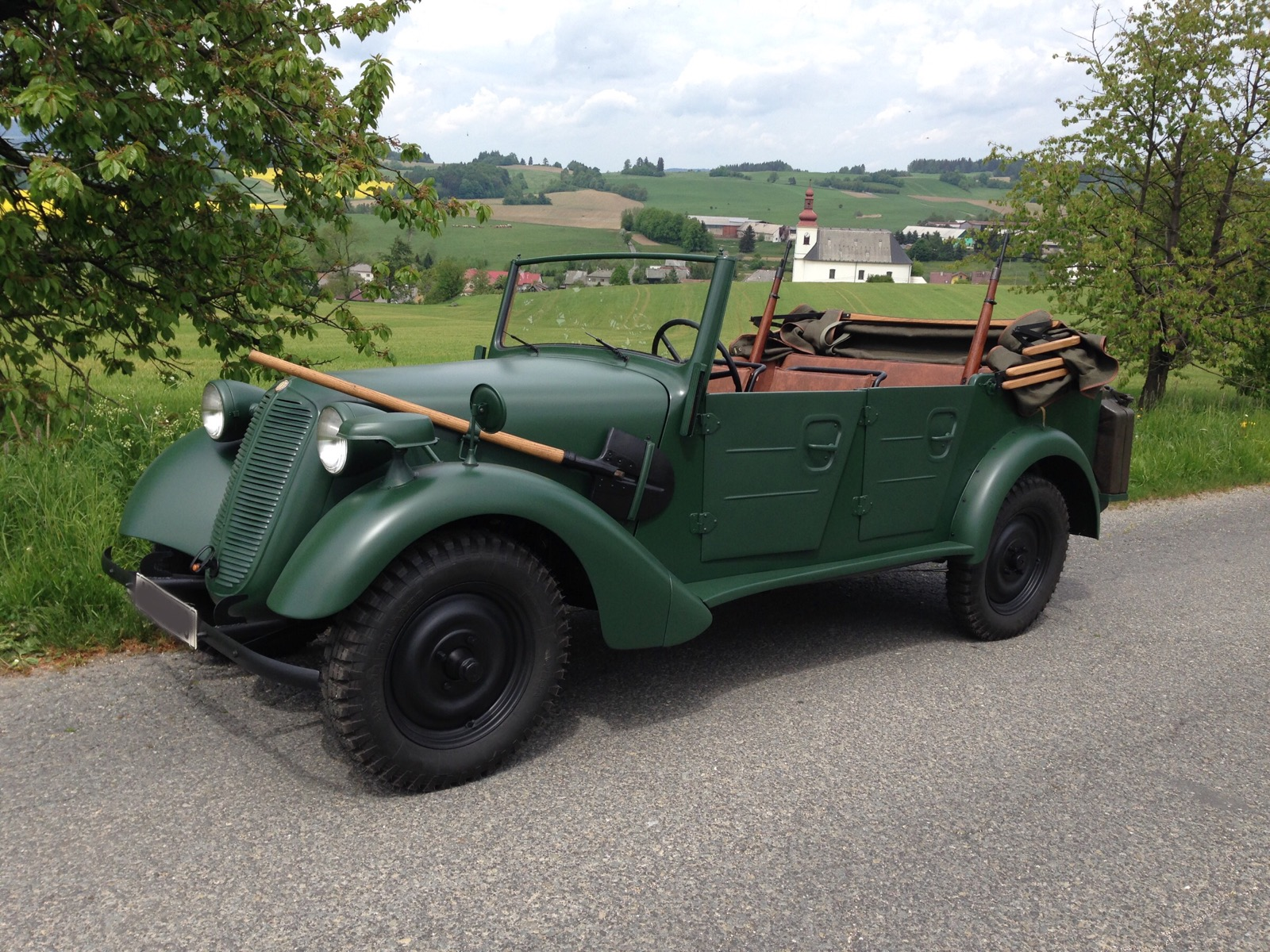

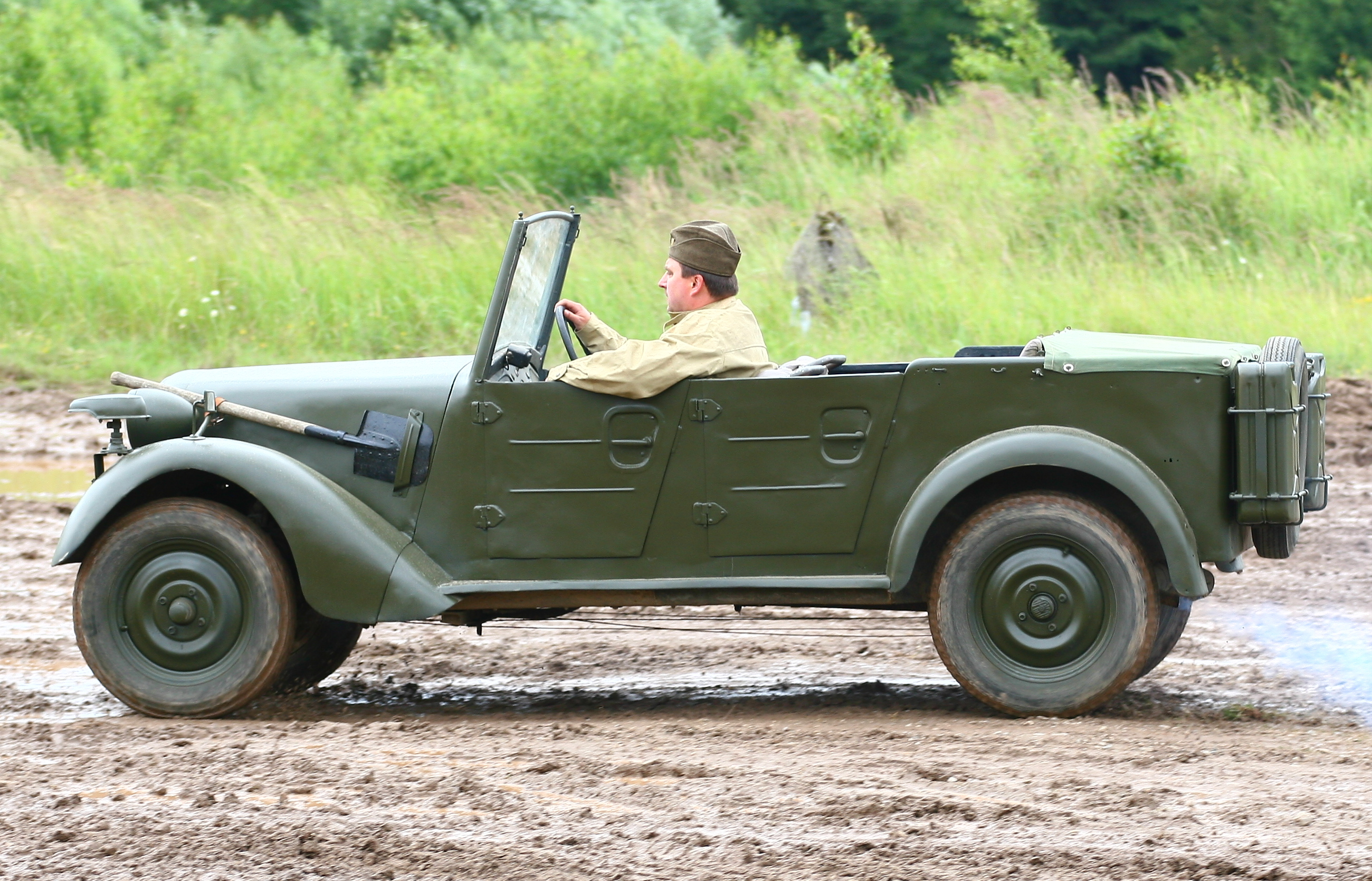

== See also ==
- Tatra V570

== Bibliography ==
- Tuček, Jan (2017). Auta první republiky 1918–1938 (in Czech). Prague: Grada Publishing. pp. 150–152, 275–278. ISBN 978-80-271-0466-6.
