= Tatra 11 =

Tatra T11
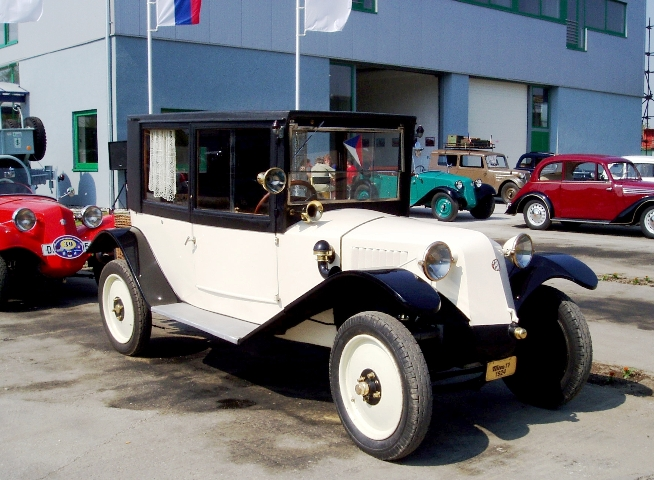

Overview
- Manufacturer: Tatra
- Also called: Tatra 11
- Production: 1923–1927
- Designer: Hans Ledwinka

Body and chassis
- Layout: FR layout
- Related: Tatra 12; Tatra 54; Tatra 57

Powertrain
- Engine: 1,056 cc (1.1 L) Tatra 11 F2
- Transmission: 4-speed manual

Dimensions
- Wheelbase: 2,635 mm (103.7 in)
- Kerb weight: 680–900 kg (1,499–1,984 lb)

Chronology
- Successor: Tatra 12

The Tatra T11 is an automobile that was produced from 1923 through 1927. It was the first Tatra model to use backbone tube chassis, swinging half-axles and air-cooled engine, the development of which is still in use on the trucks produced by Tatra to this day.

== Origins ==
Hans Ledwinka created the design of the T11 while working for Steyr in Austria. He believed there was a need for a small car, and carried out the work in his own time. His design offered to the Steyr management was rejected. He left the company soon after to work for a previous employer, Nesseldorfer, in Moravia, which was soon to become Tatra. This was in 1921 and the development of the T11 started soon after. The T11 was produced between 1923 and 1927 with 3,847 examples made. It was then replaced by the T12, a development of the T11 design, with 7,222 being produced by 1936 when it was discontinued.

== Specifications ==
The Tatra T11 had its engine and gearbox in unit, bolted to the front of a tubular backbone with an integral propeller shaft that also served as the chassis. Bolted to the rear of the backbone is a final drive unit that, using an assembly of gears, not only changes the direction and speed of the drive, but facilitates the movement of swing axles without the need for flexible drive joints.

The T11's engine was an air-cooled horizontally opposed twin cylinder engine with overhead valves. It had a capacity of 1,057 cc (64.5 cu in) and was located above the front beam axle which was attached to it by a transverse semi-elliptical leaf spring.

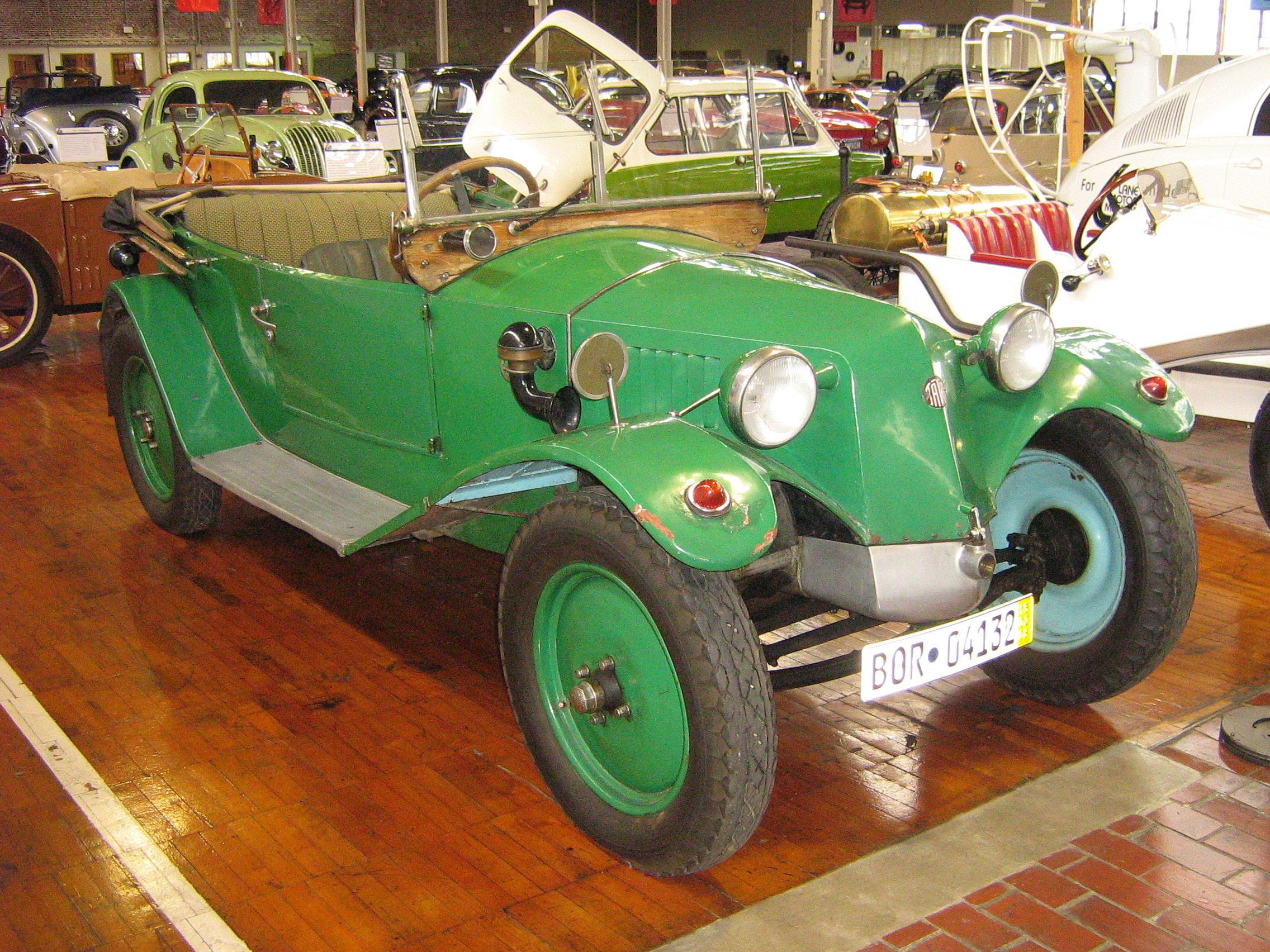

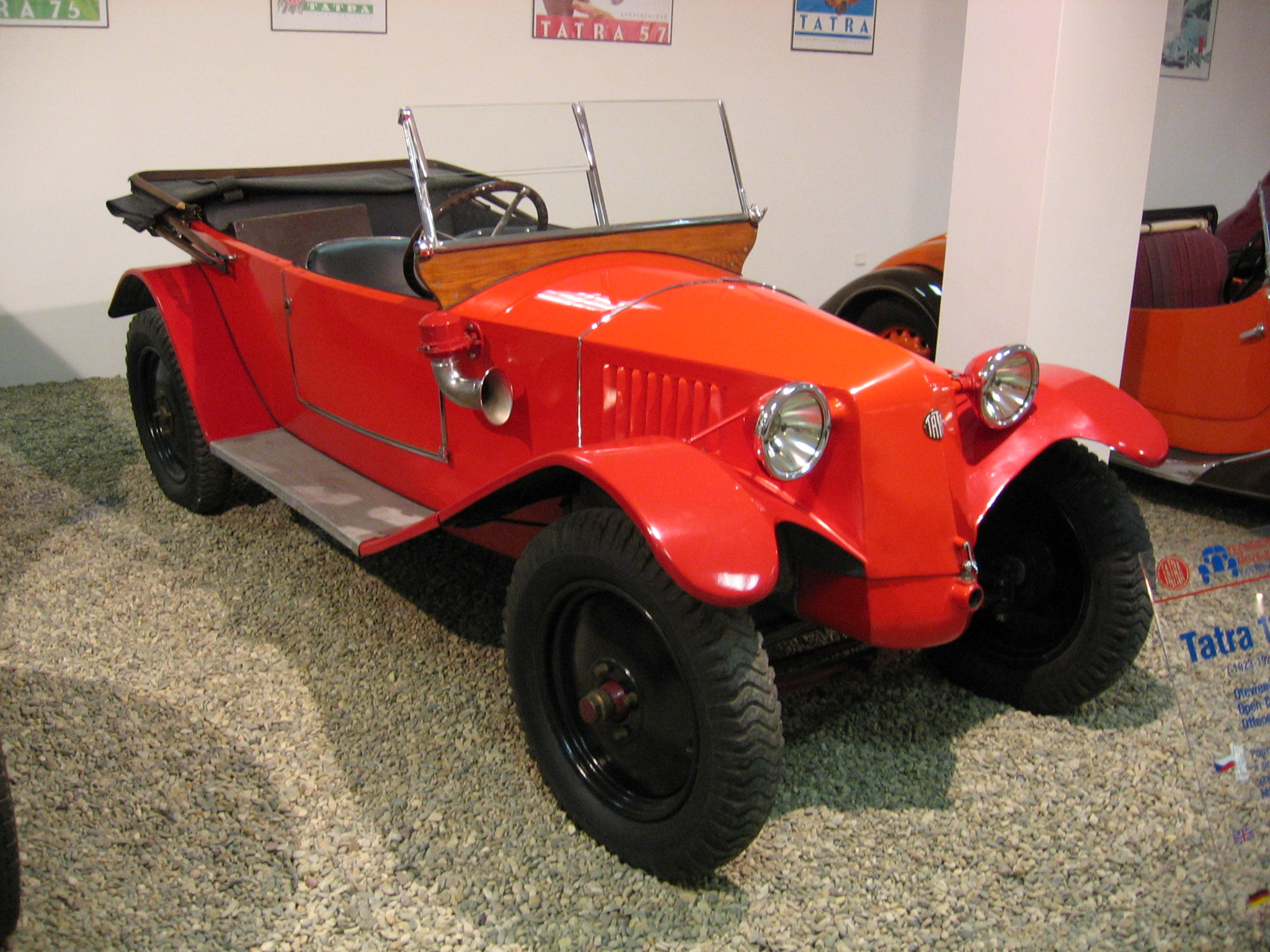

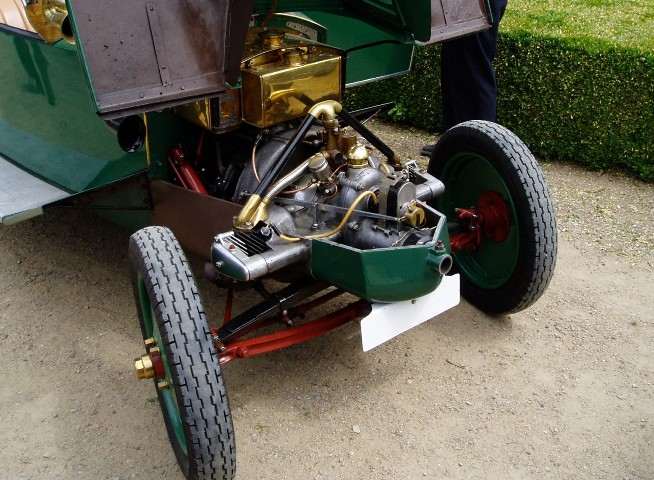
T11 engine

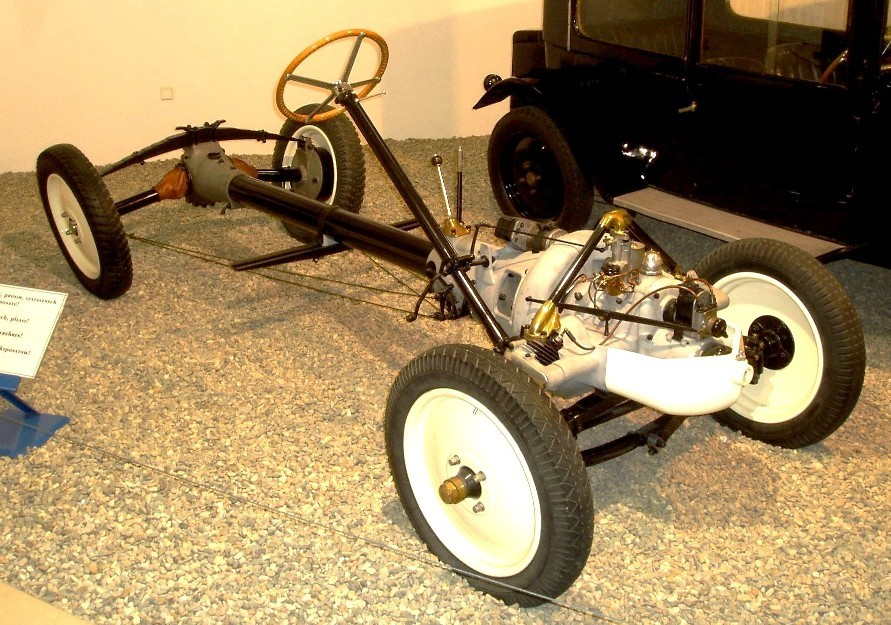
T11 chassis

== Legacy ==
From 1931 the T12 was joined by the T57 with a 1155 cc air-cooled flat four engine, and the T54 with a 1465 cc engine of the same configuration; both models were based on the original T11 format. Only 486 T54 models were produced by 1936 when production stopped.

The T57 was developed in T57A, T57B, and T57K versions, remaining in production until 1948, by which time over 27,000 had been produced, the later models having a 1256 cc engine.
