= Tatra 12 =

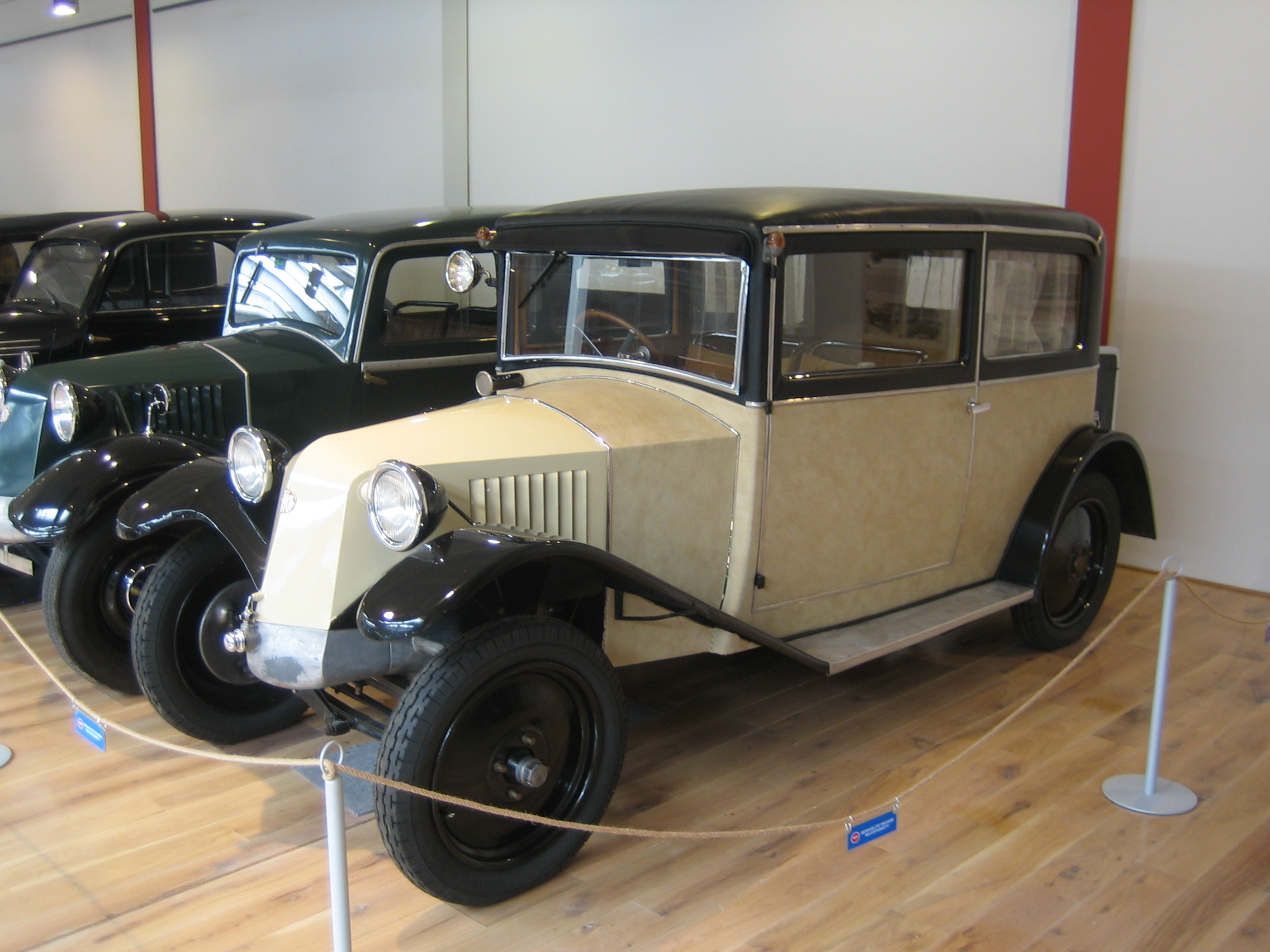

Overview
- Manufacturer: Tatra
- Production: 1926–1933; 7525 produced
- Assembly: Kopřivnice, Moravia, Czechoslovakia

Body and chassis
- Class: Mid-size car
- Body style: See picture
- Layout: FR layout

Powertrain
- Engine: 1,057 cc (1.1 L) Tatra 12 F2
- Transmission: 4-speed manual

Dimensions
- Wheelbase: 2,646 mm (104.2 in)
- Curb weight: 680–900 kg (1,499–1,984 lb)

Chronology
- Predecessor: Tatra 11
- Successor: Tatra 57

The Tatra 12 is an automobile produced by Czech manufacturer Tatra between 1926 and 1933. It was replaced by the Tatra 57 in 1932.

At the beginning of the 1920s, Czech car manufacturers were focusing on producing large and expensive cars which only the rich could afford. Some companies began to introduce less expensive designs, intending them to be affordable for the middle class. Tatra entered this market with the Tatra 11, to which the Tatra 12 was the successor.

== Design ==
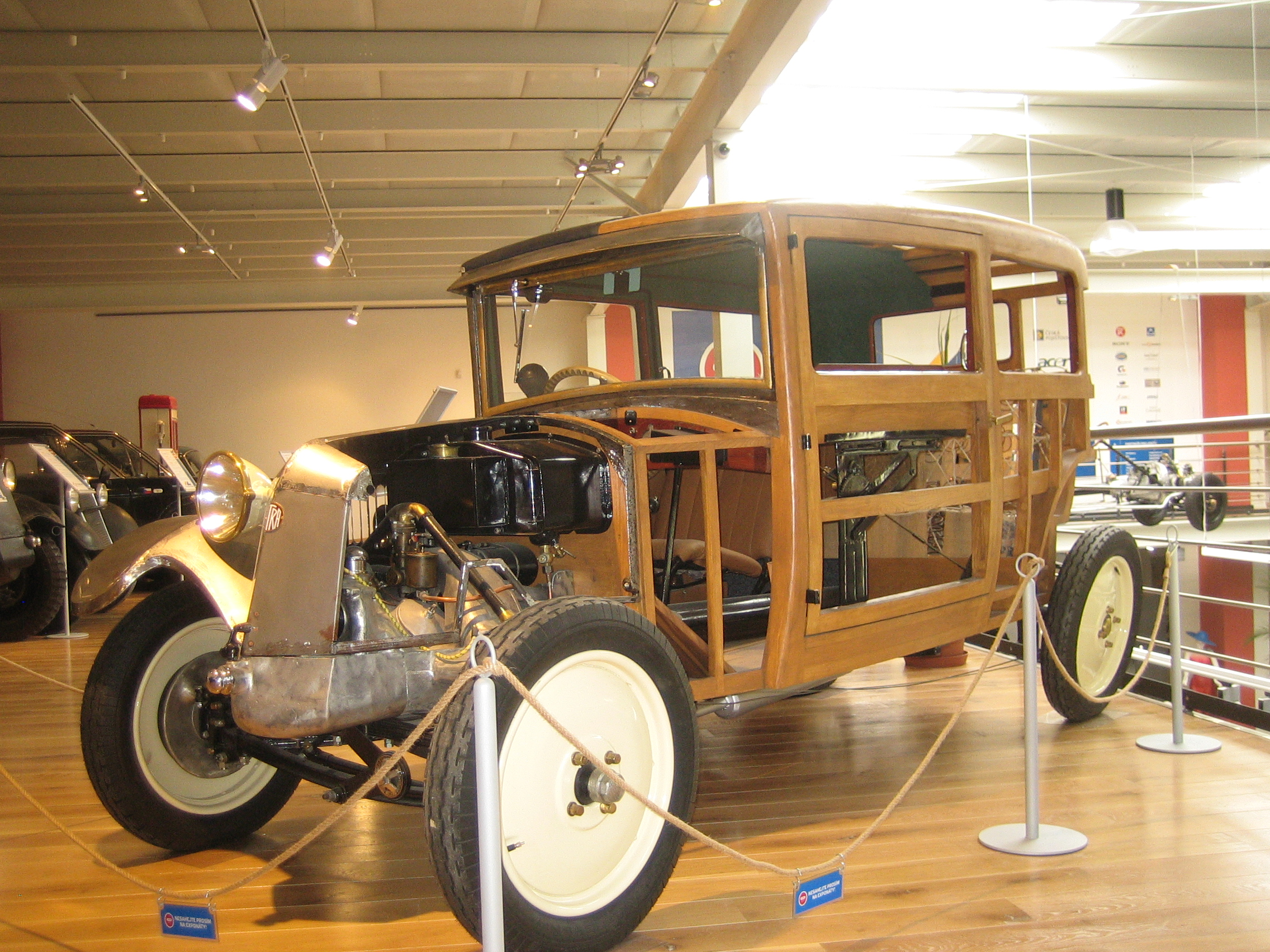
Cut through Tatra 12 body

Hans Ledwinka, Tatra's designer, came up with the revolutionary idea of a backbone tube chassis, which he introduced on the Tatra 11. The Tatra 12 followed the same principles, which had the differential and final drive with swing half-axles mounted at the rear of the backbone tube. The gearbox has 4 forward gears and 1 reverse gear. The engine is mounted on top of the gearbox, and the two are then mounted on the front of the backbone tube.

The engine is a petrol flat two cylinder which is, notably, air-cooled. Thanks to this the expensive and heavy radiators could be avoided. This was an excellent idea at the time, when antifreeze was rather problematic.

The front axle has transverse leaf spring suspension. While the Tatra 11 had drum brakes only on the rear wheels, the Tatra 12 has drum brakes all around.

The two-door four seat saloon had nickel-plated (later chrome-plated) cantilever tubular steel front seats, with folding backrests installed. These inspired Mart Stam to design his own cantilever chair.

== Versions ==
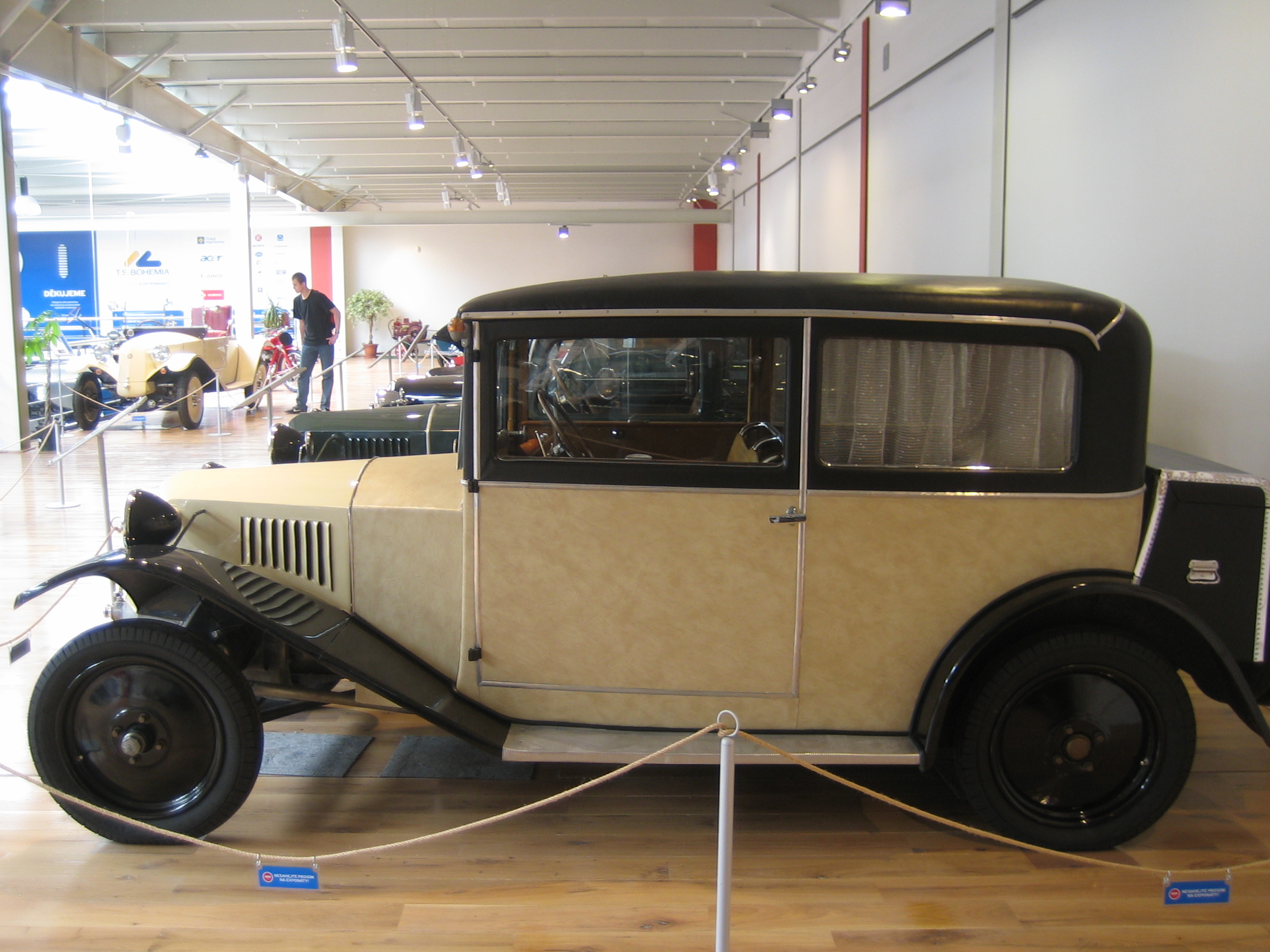
Weymann motor body covered in artificial leather

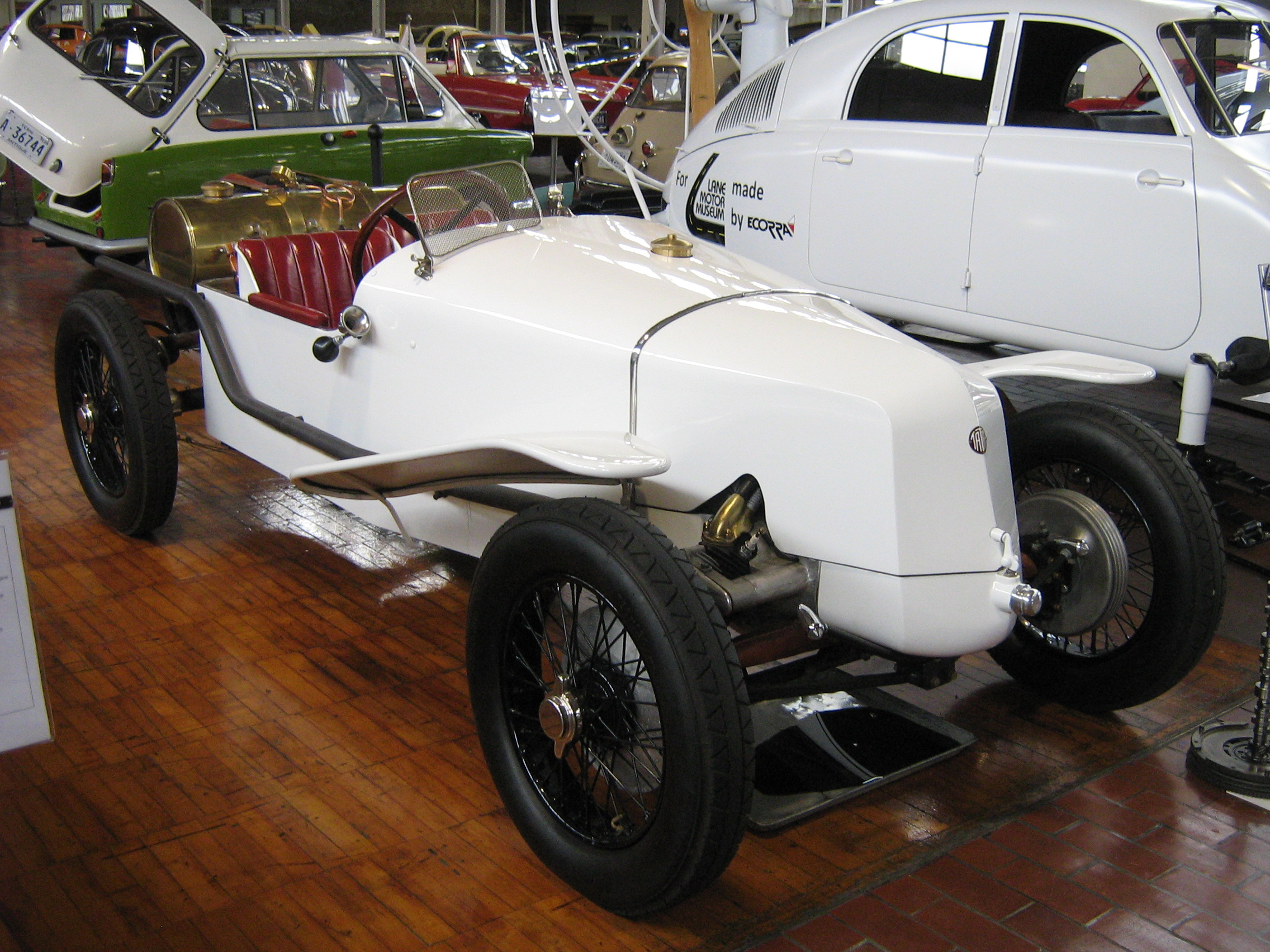
Tatra 12 Targa Florio replica

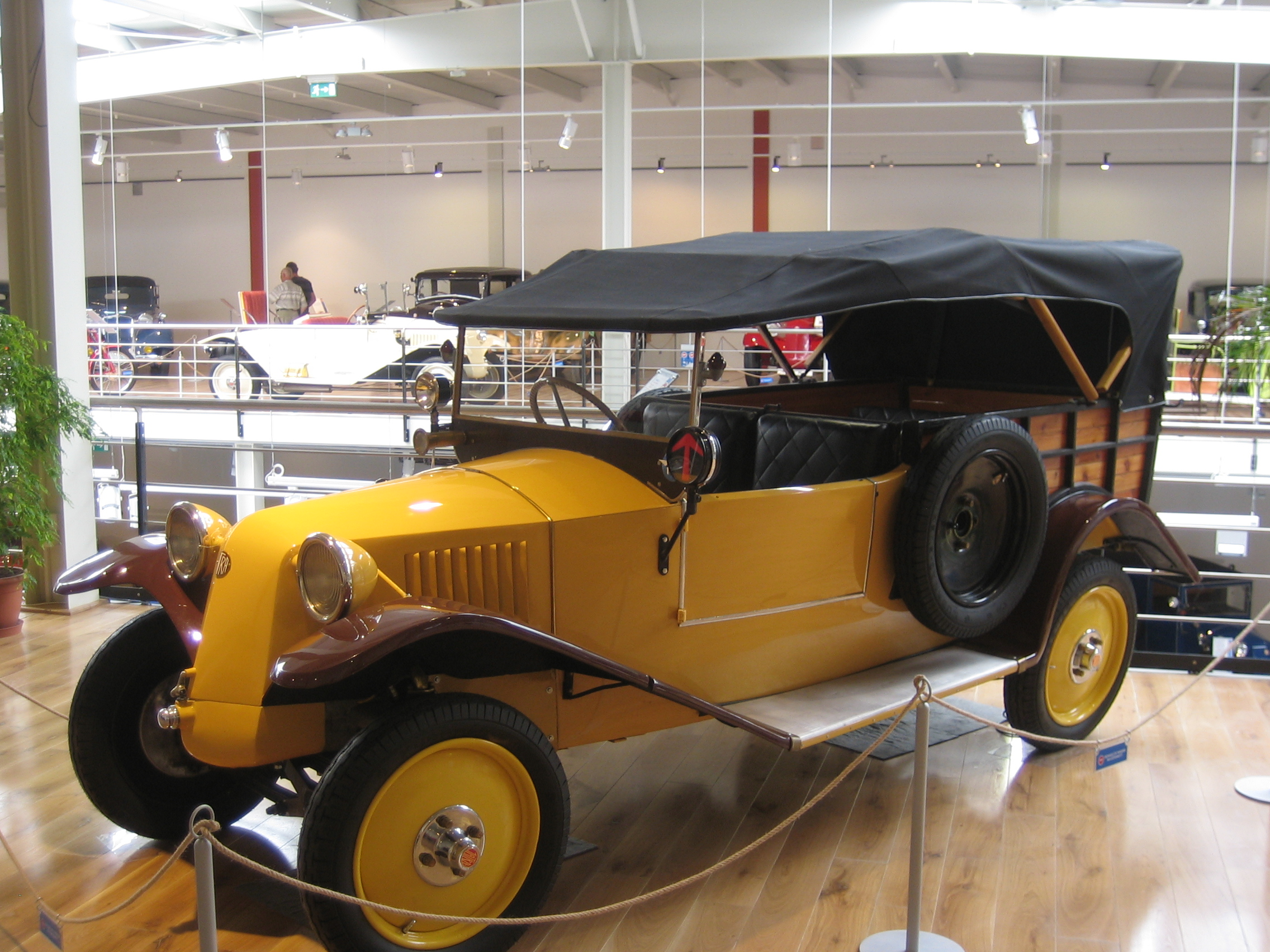
Tatra 12 Normandie

The chassis itself weighs around 500 kg (1,100 lb). There were many different bodies built on it. The chassis itself was also sold to other manufacturers to build their own car bodies on it.

=== Weymann motor body ===
Most car bodies of the era were built by nailing metal plates on the wooden skeleton of the car. The wood was usually very rigid, often the ash-tree was used. This made the body very firm, but rather heavy.

Weymann's system was different. The wooden pieces were not mortised together, but only loosely put next to each other. The wooden pieces were merely touching each other and its ends were coated in a buffer material (often leather). The wooden pieces were joined via steel strips. This type of bodywork wasn't totally firm, but it allowed natural shifts which occur as the wood gets dry or wet. Such shifts made it impossible for use of metal sheets, therefore the exterior was covered in artificial leather.

=== Targa Florio ===
The Targa Florio version was quite different from the serial production models. The engine and the bodywork were changed the most, but the chassis was also altered by changing the front axle.

The cylinders were made from a special alloy, which allowed it to work even under extreme heat. The modified engine had about 30 PS (22 kW) at 5000 rpm (the standard version had about half). The car had also the tachometer, unlike the production version. The front axle was similar to the Tatra 17's, with swinging half axles (standard version had half axles only at the rear, while front was solid).

The bodywork itself was built in a manner similar to the aeroplane design of the era - from plywood; only the front bonnet was made from aluminium plate. This made the body weigh only around 25 kg (55 lb), while the whole car weighed 560 kg (1,230 lb).

The car was able to reach speeds up to 120 km/h (75 mph) (almost twice that of the standard version) and it therefore needed better brakes. To allow easier re-fuelling the fuel tank with capacity of 60 L (16 US gal) was placed behind the rear seats. To its advantage the Tatra 12 didn't need stops for change of coolant (as the engine was air-cooled). The factory made the cars with mud-guards; however, they were usually stripped for a race.

The Targa Florio cars took part in many races, i.e. in Stuttgart, Ecce Homo, or the Great Russian contest of reliability. In 1925 debuting Tatra 12s took part in the Sicilian Targa Florio race, after which the race models were later named. The two cars driven by Fritz Huckel and Karel Sponer took both first and second position in the under-1100cc category. Huckel had beaten the track record by 26 minutes and Sponer had beaten it by 21 minutes.

=== Normandie ===
The Normandie car bodies were modelled after the popular French cars of the time. The cheaper version was often used as a utility car.

=== Other versions ===
There were many other versions built both by Tatra itself, or other manufacturers who were building their own car bodies on top of the Tatra 12 chassis.

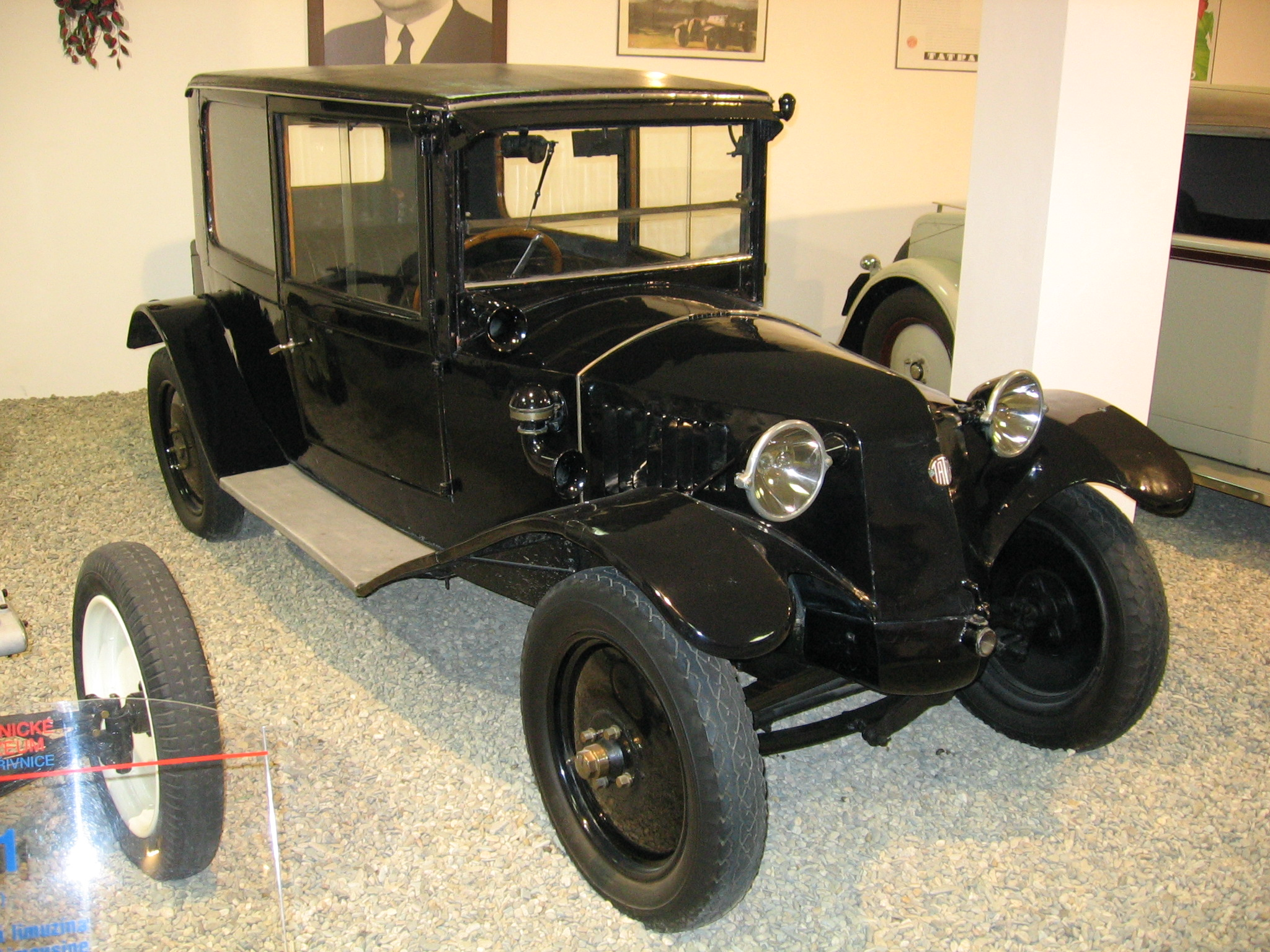

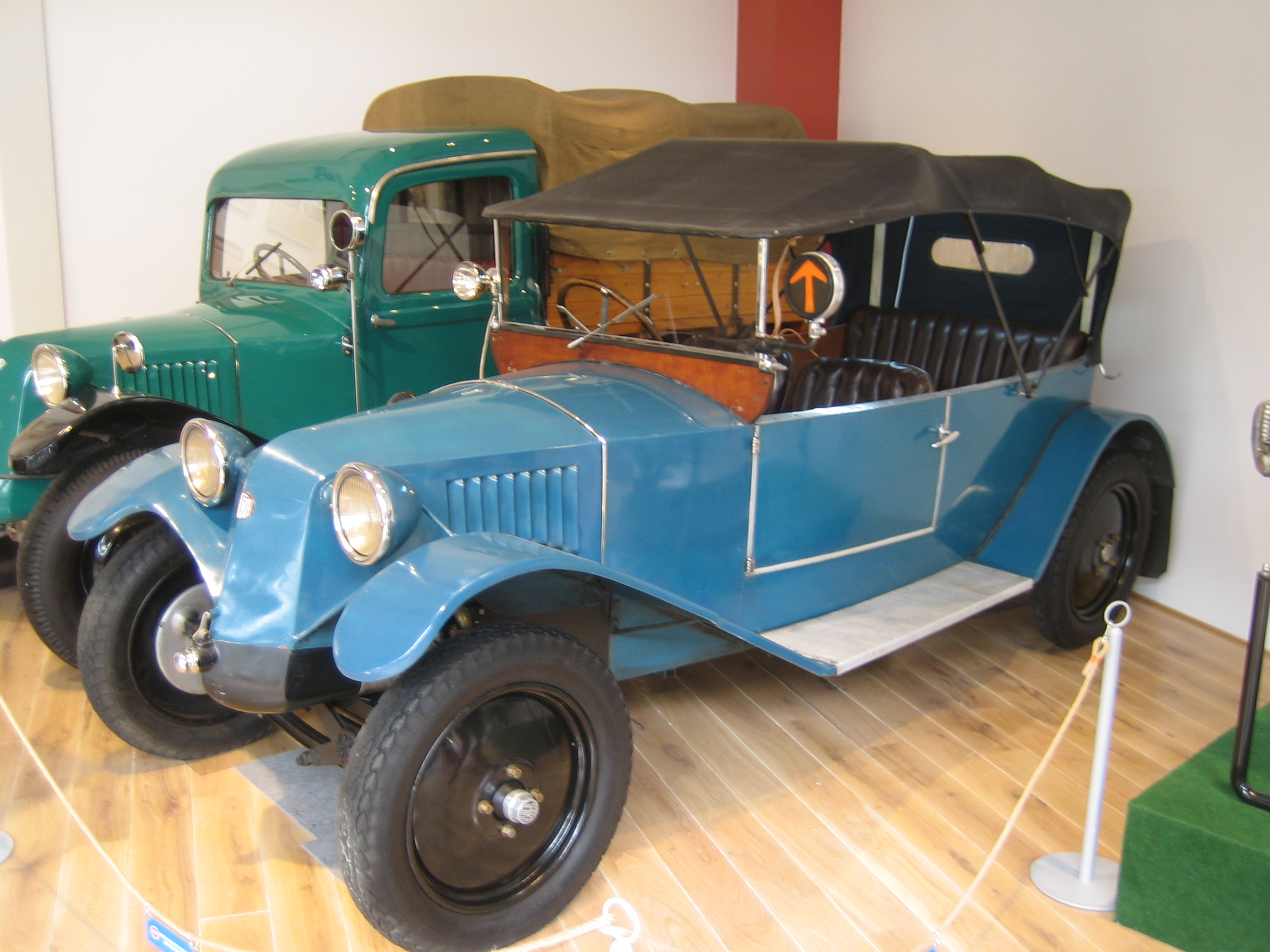

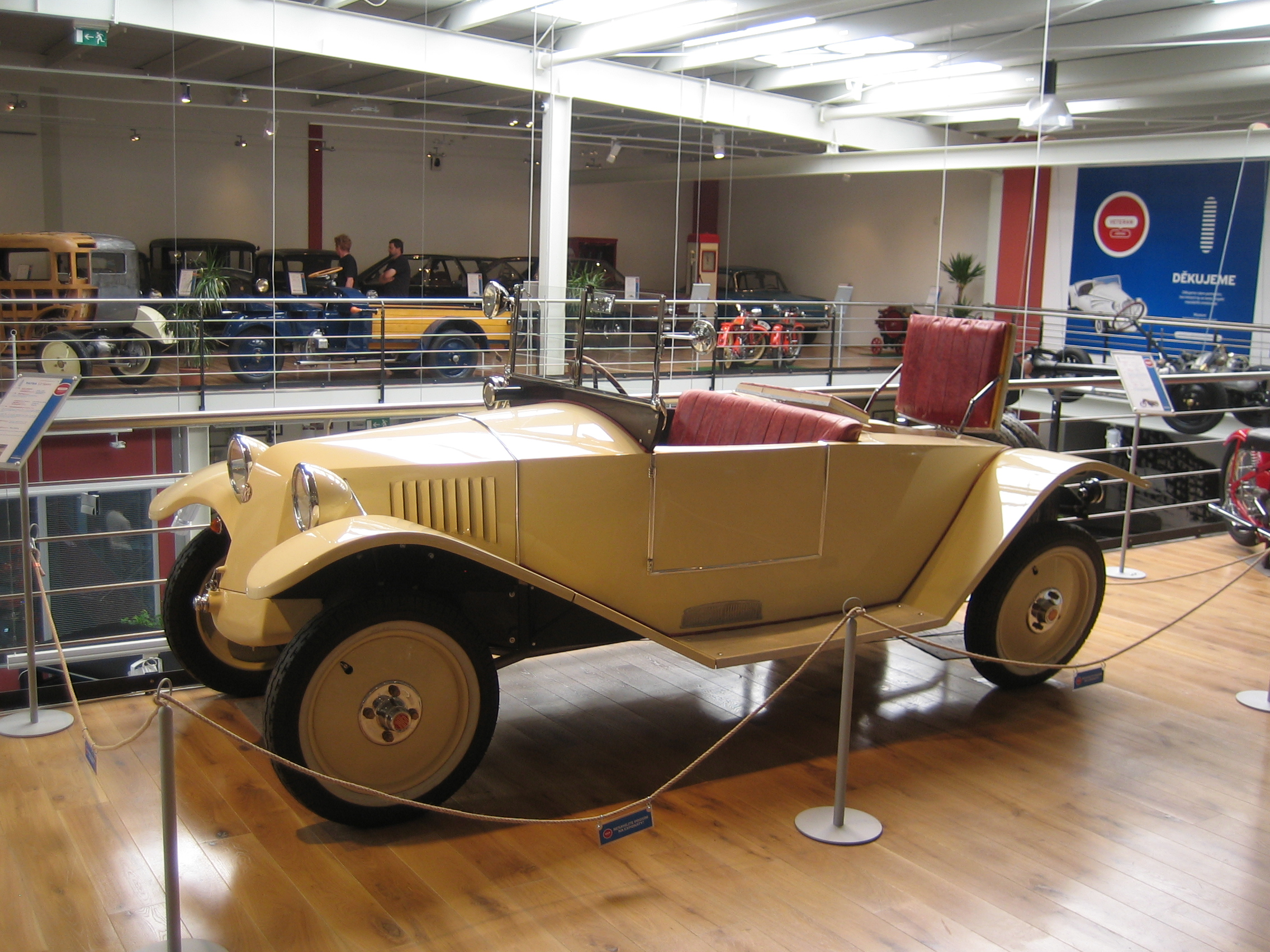
Tatra 12 Sport

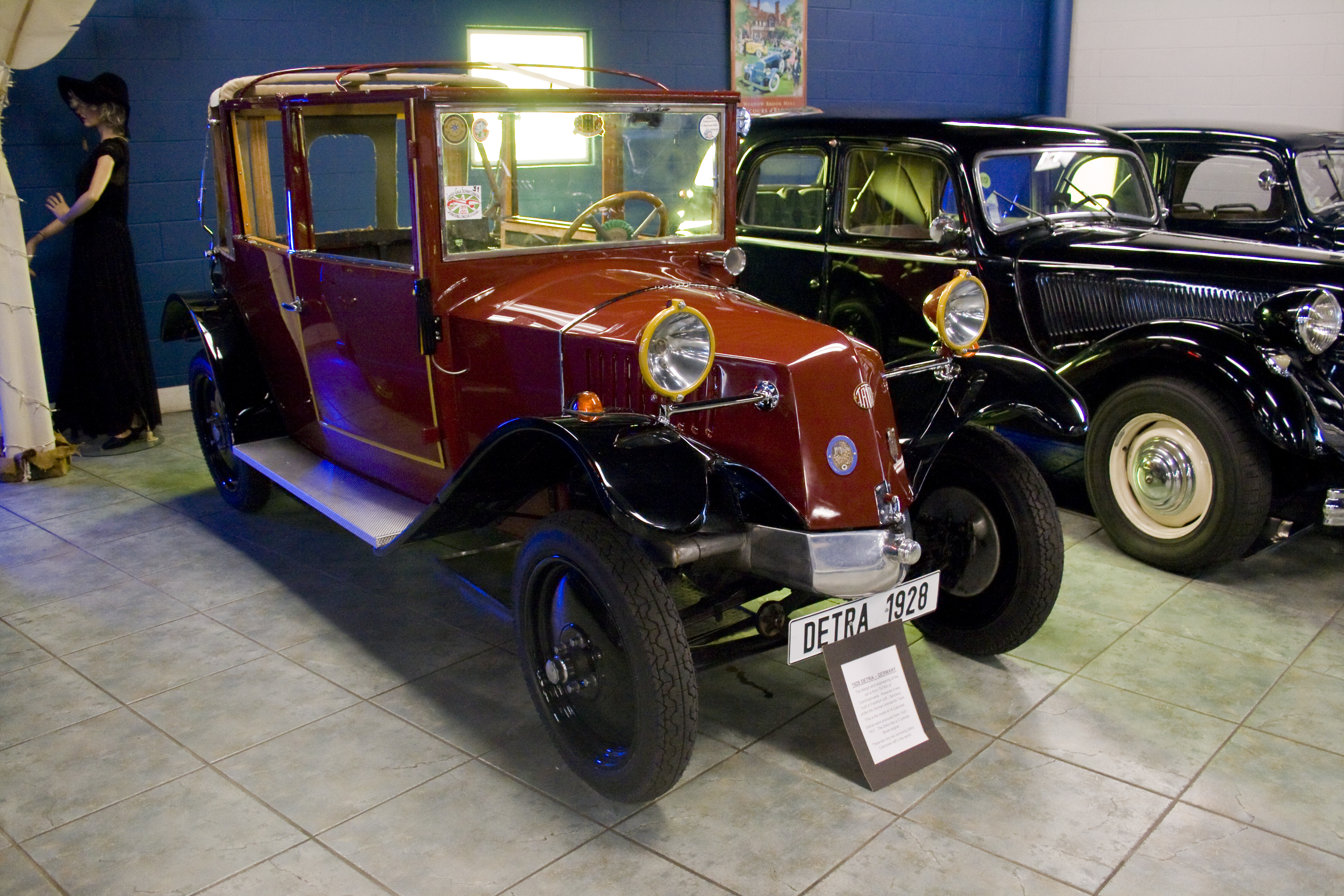
1928 Detra - a rebranded Tatra 12 assembled in Germany

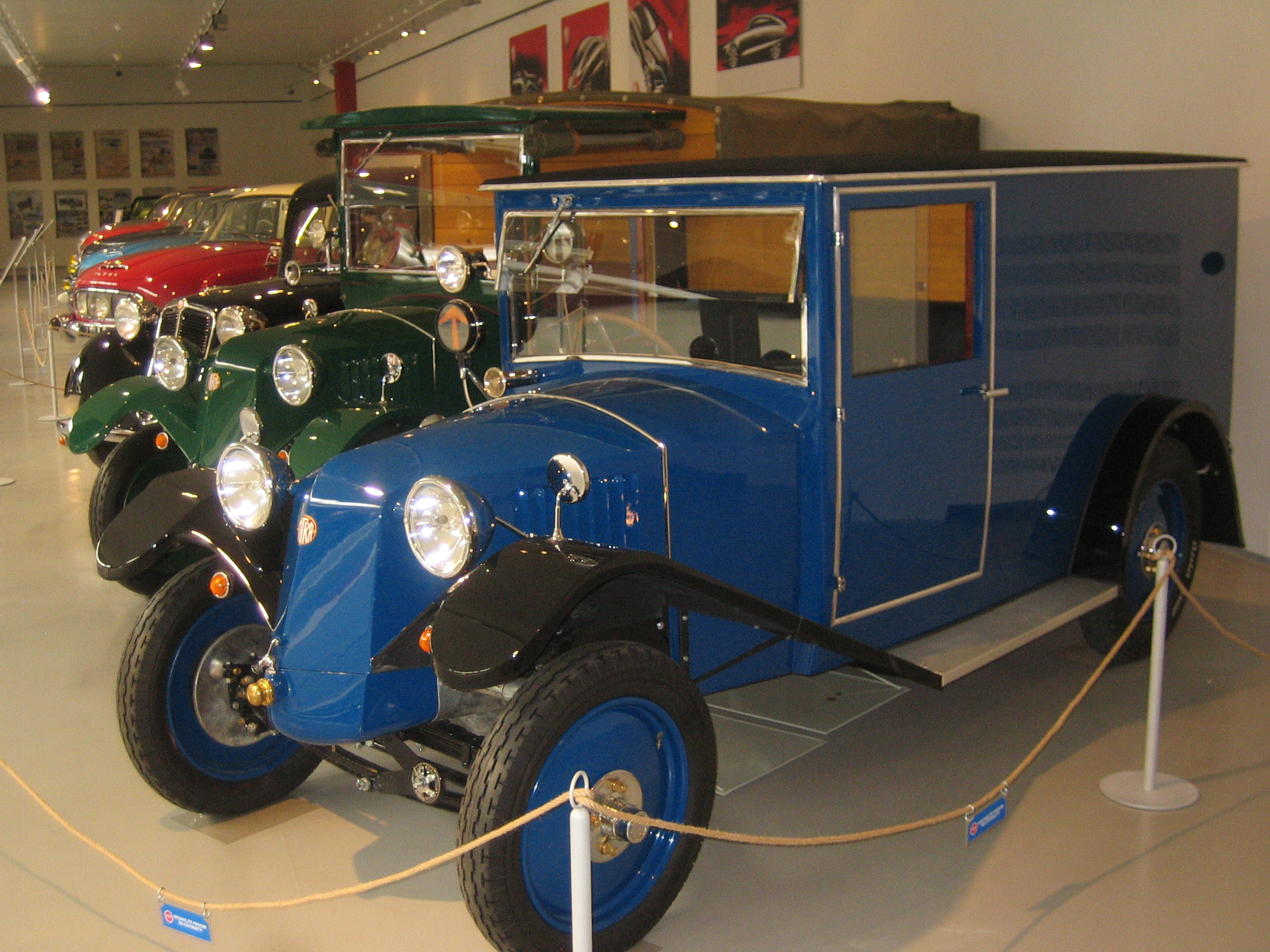
Tatra 12 Van

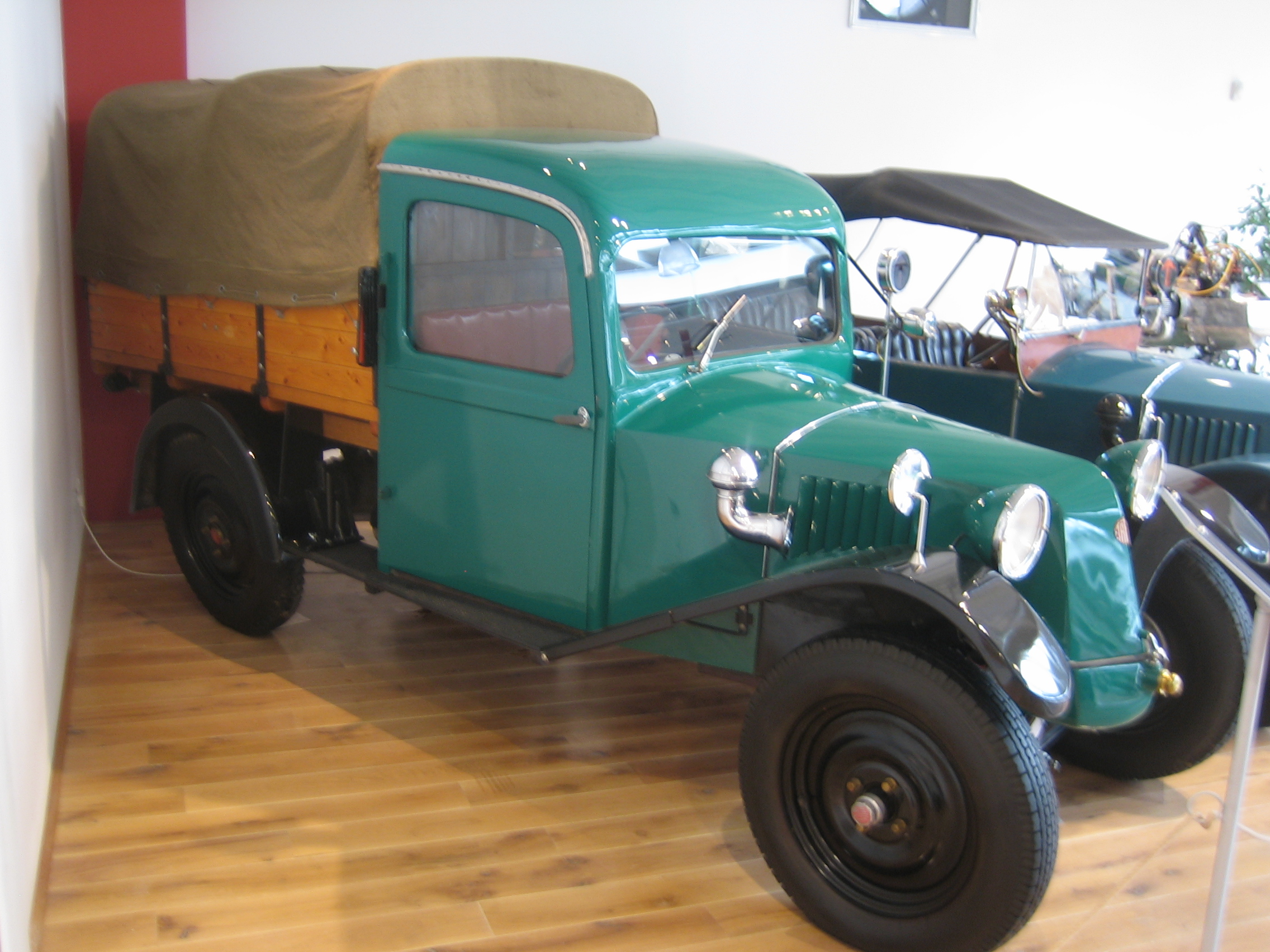
Tatra 12 Pickup

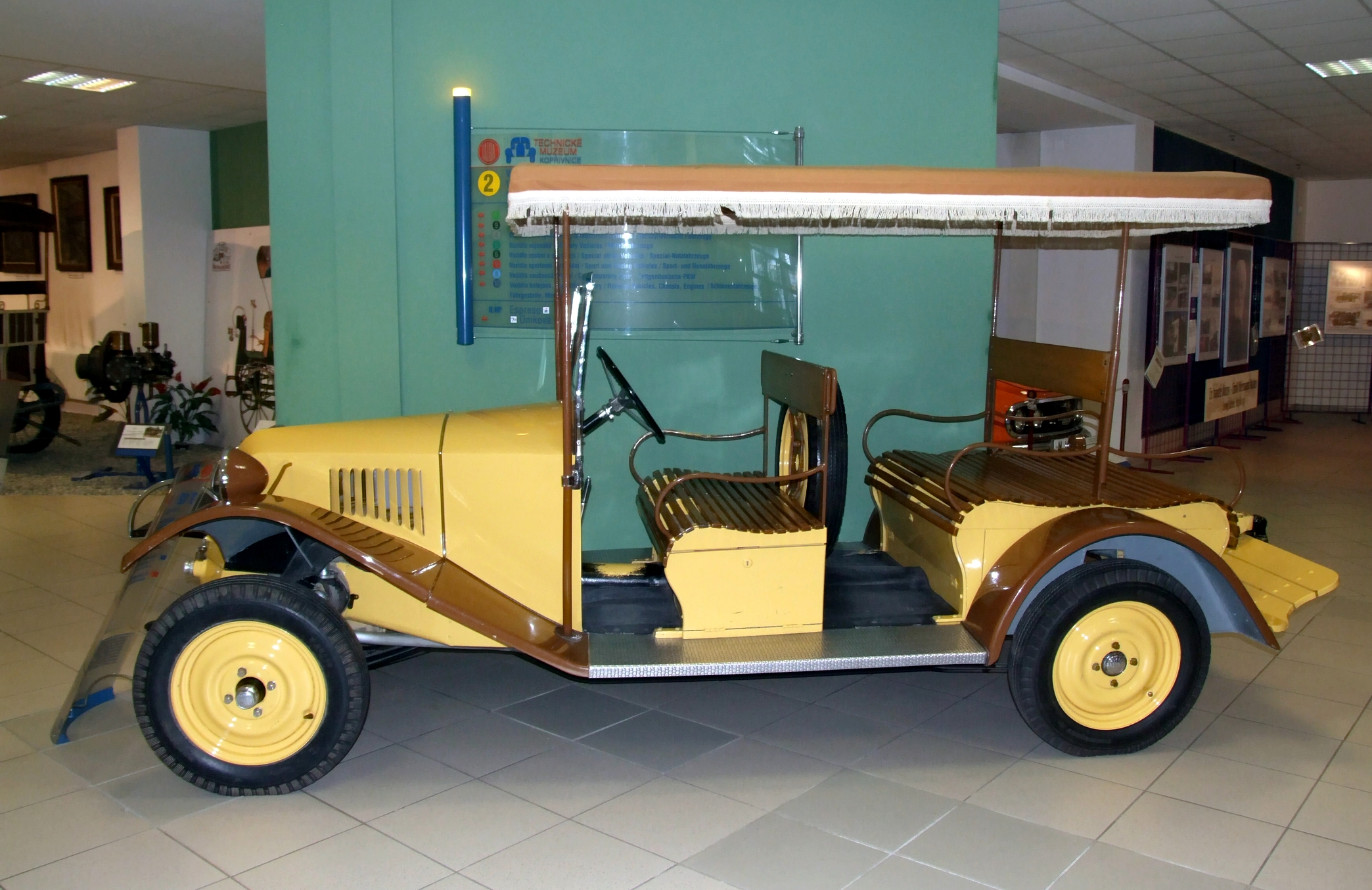
Tatra 12 Firefighting car

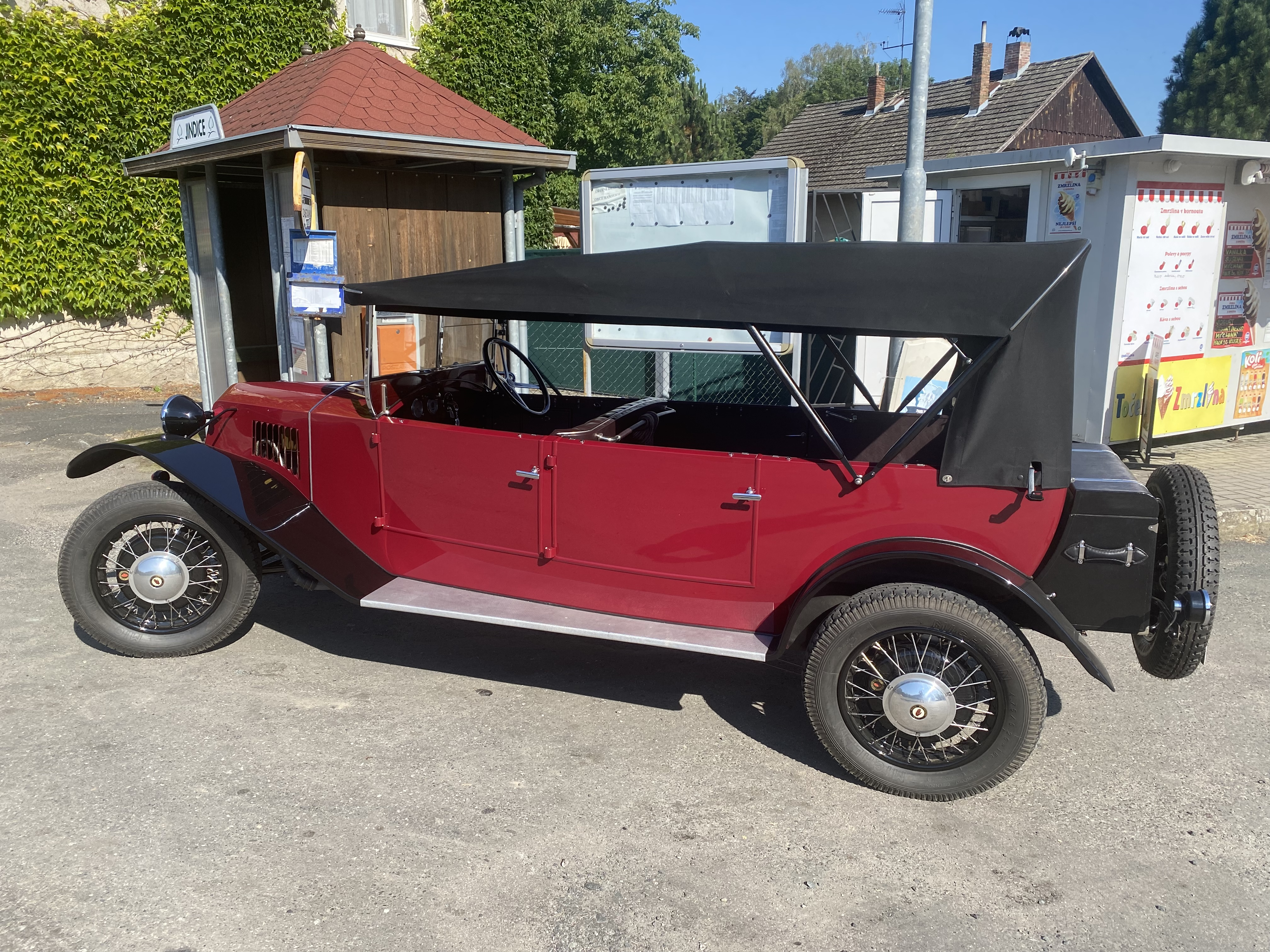
Tatra 12 - 1926 model
