= Frank J. Nunlist =

American businessman

- Frank J. Nunlist, President of Studebaker-Worthington
- Born: 8 September 1913; Columbus, Ohio
- Died: 12 May 1974 (aged 60)
- Occupation: Businessman
- Known for: Chairman of Worthington Corporation

Frank J. Nunlist (8 September 1913 – 15 May 1974) was an American businessman who became chairman of Worthington Corporation, and then of Studebaker-Worthington. After retiring, he was appointed Assistant Postmaster General, Bureau of Operations.

== Early career ==
Frank J. Nunlist was born in Columbus, Ohio in 1913. He attended Columbia University, where he studied chemical engineering. He worked for American Radiator and Standard Sanitary Corporation for eight years before joining L.J. Mueller Furnace company of Milwaukee in 1941. Nunlist's first position at L.J. Mueller was assistant chief engineer. He became chief engineer in 1944, general sales manager in 1952 and vice president of sales in 1954. That year Worthington Corporation purchased Mueller. In 1956 Nunlist was appointed executive vice-president of the Mueller Climatrol division. In 1958 he was appointed a vice-president of Worthington. In 1960 he was made a director of the company and vice-president of operations.

== Worthington President and CEO ==
Nunlist was elected president of Worthington in 1962, replacing Walter Feldman, who had been president from 1957 to 1962. Feldman became chairman. In 1965 Nunlist was appointed chief executive officer. In April 1967 he was elected chairman and chief executive officer at the age of 53, while Admiral (retired) Albert G. Mumma was appointed president and chief operating officer.

In 1967 the entrepreneur Derald Ruttenberg organized a merger of Studebaker and Worthington Corporation to form Studebaker-Worthington. The merger was completed in November 1967, creating a company with $550 million of assets. The combined company included the profitable divisions from Studebaker, brake and electrical automobile component manufacturing from Wagner Electric, and diverse operations from Worthington that included manufacture of construction equipment, valves and power generation plant. Frank J. Nunlist was appointed president and chief executive officer. Randolph Guthrie of Studebaker was chairman of the new company.

Nunlist was a member of the Business Advisory Committee for Nixon-Agnew in the 1968 presidential campaign. Nunlist resigned from Studebaker-Worthington effective 31 December 1968. It was reported that the cause was a dispute over the restructuring of the company proposed by Ruttenberg. In January 1969 the board of directors replaced Nunlist with Derald H. Ruttenberg as president and chief executive officer.

== Later career ==
Frank J. Nunlist was nominated by President Nixon as Assistant Postmaster General, Bureau of Operations, with confirmation hearings before the United States Senate Committee on Post Office and Civil Service starting on 25 April 1969. He was confirmed in this position. In an effort to reduce costs, the post office introduced a change to their policy for handling first-class mail that would no longer achieve overnight delivery. Nunlist told regional postal officials to avoid publicity. He said, "we have got to be a little tight about this, and you can't even say to your employees in the post office, 'Don't promise prompt service.' We have got to play this game pretty carefully."

Nunlist retired from the post office in June 1971. He became chairman of the board of the Pantasote Company in Greenwich, Connecticut. Frank J. Nunlist died on 12 May 1974.
