= Mudge Rose Guthrie Alexander & Ferdon =

Defunct law firm

- Headquarters: New York City, U.S.
- No. of attorneys: 190
- Key people: Richard Nixon
- Date founded: 1869
- Dissolved: 1995

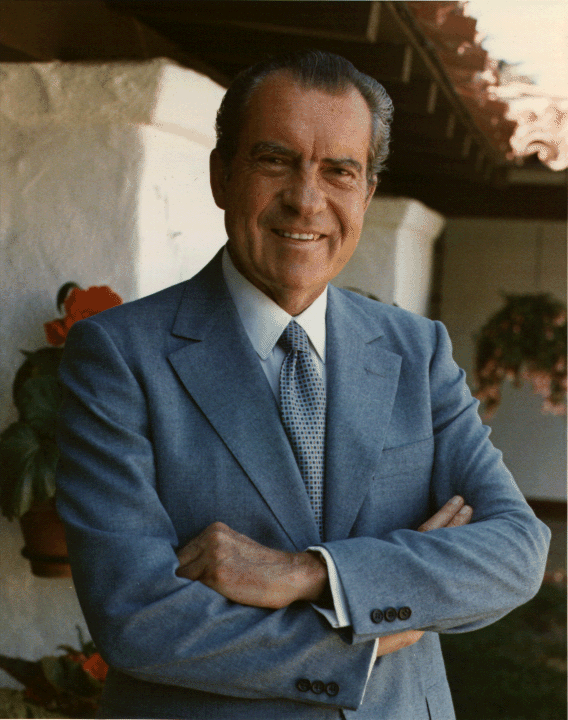
Former U.S. president Richard Nixon, who joined the firm following his loss in the 1962 California gubernatorial election

Mudge Rose Guthrie Alexander & Ferdon was a New York City law firm founded in 1869. The firm was later known as Nixon, Mudge, Rose, Guthrie, & Alexander, and was subsequently again renamed as Mudge, Rose, Guthrie & Alexander.

The firm is best known best as the law firm where Richard Nixon relaunched his career following his losses in the 1960 presidential election and 1962 California gubernatorial election. Nixon served as "public partner" for the firm, bringing in business and clients, and the firm gave him a platform to plan his political comeback. Several of Nixon's key aides and advisors during the 1968 Presidential campaign came from the firm, and Nixon met John Mitchell, his 1968 campaign chair and eventual Attorney General, after Nixon, Mudge, Rose, Guthrie & Alexander merged with Caldwell, Trimble & Mitchell in 1967. Plagued with internal fights for leadership and management authority in the firm, combined with defections of some of its largest clients, the firm was dissolved in 1995. At the time, it employed approximately 190 attorneys.

== Notable employees ==
Notable attorneys and employee at the firm included:

- Geoffrey Berman, United States Attorney for the Southern District of New York
- William P. Ford, civil rights advocate for Salvadorans.
- David M. Friedman, U.S. ambassador to Israel
- Randolph H. Guthrie, chairman of the Studebaker corporation and later of Studebaker-Worthington.
- Elizabeth Blodgett Hall, headmistress for Concord Academy
- Leonard Garment, White House Counsel after the resignation of John Dean
- James Halpern, United States Tax Court judge
- John Kirby, notable for his successful defense for Nintendo against Universal Studios over the copyrightability of the character of Donkey Kong.
- Scooter Libby, former assistant to U.S. vice president Dick Cheney and U.S. president George W. Bush
- John N. Mitchell, United States Attorney General
- Richard Nixon, the thirty-seventh president of the United States
- Ralph Oman, former Register of Copyrights of the United States
- Jed S. Rakoff, a United States District Judge for the Southern District of New York
- John Sears, an attorney and a Republican political strategist.
- Gordon C. Strachan, aide to White House Chief of Staff H.R. "Bob" Haldeman under U.S. President Richard Nixon
- Gao Xiqing, General Manager of the China Investment Corporation
