= The Cost of a Skin =

1907 essay by J. Howard Moore

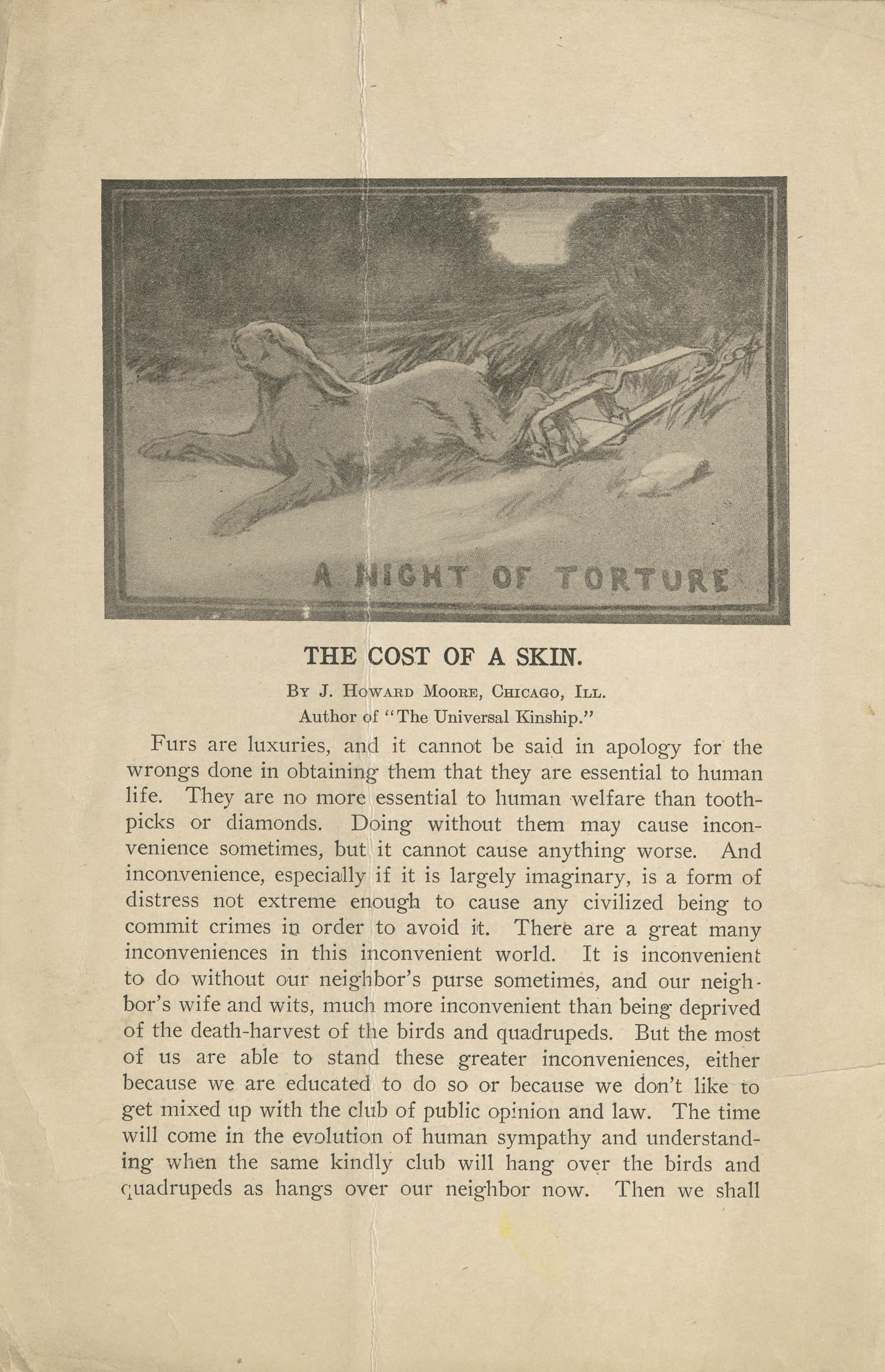
- Title page of the American Humane Association pamphlet edition
- Author: J. Howard Moore
- Language: English
- Subject: Animal welfare; Fur clothing; Animal trapping
- Publication date: 1907
- Text: The Cost of a Skin at Wikisource

"The Cost of a Skin" is a 1907 essay by the American zoologist and philosopher J. Howard Moore. First delivered as a paper at the American Humane Association's annual convention in Chicago in November 1906, it criticizes the use of animal fur, skins, and feathers in clothing and describes the suffering caused by animal trapping. Moore argues that killing animals for ornament is incompatible with humane conduct and asks readers to consider how humans would regard a more powerful species that hunted them for the same purposes. He also advocates plant-based alternatives to leather and other animal-derived clothing, and criticizes the economic relationship between leather production and the meat trade.

The paper provoked a mixed response at the convention. It was subsequently published in Moore's The New Ethics (1907), in The Herald of the Golden Age, and in several pamphlet and leaflet editions issued by animal protection organizations in Britain and the United States. Later editions differed in their arrangement and content.

== Background ==
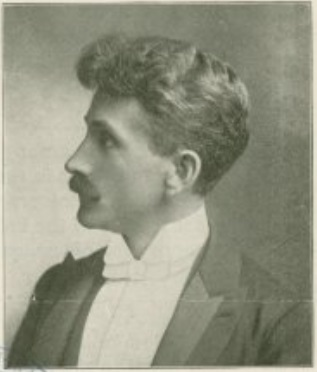
J. Howard Moore, c. 1899

J. Howard Moore (1862–1916) was an American zoologist, philosopher, animal rights advocate, and ethical vegetarian. His writings applied evolutionary theory to moral philosophy and argued that ethical consideration should extend beyond the human species.

On November 15, 1906, Moore presented "The Cost of a Skin" at the American Humane Association's annual convention in Chicago. He condemned the use of fur and feathers in fashion as "conscienceless and inhumane".

The address divided the audience. Historian Janet M. Davis describes an emotional response among members of the association, including "tears and hysterical denials", with some listeners leaving during the speech. Donna L. Davey gives a more detailed account of the differing reactions, recording that some members applauded, others remained silent, and two women walked out before Moore had finished speaking.

== Publication history ==
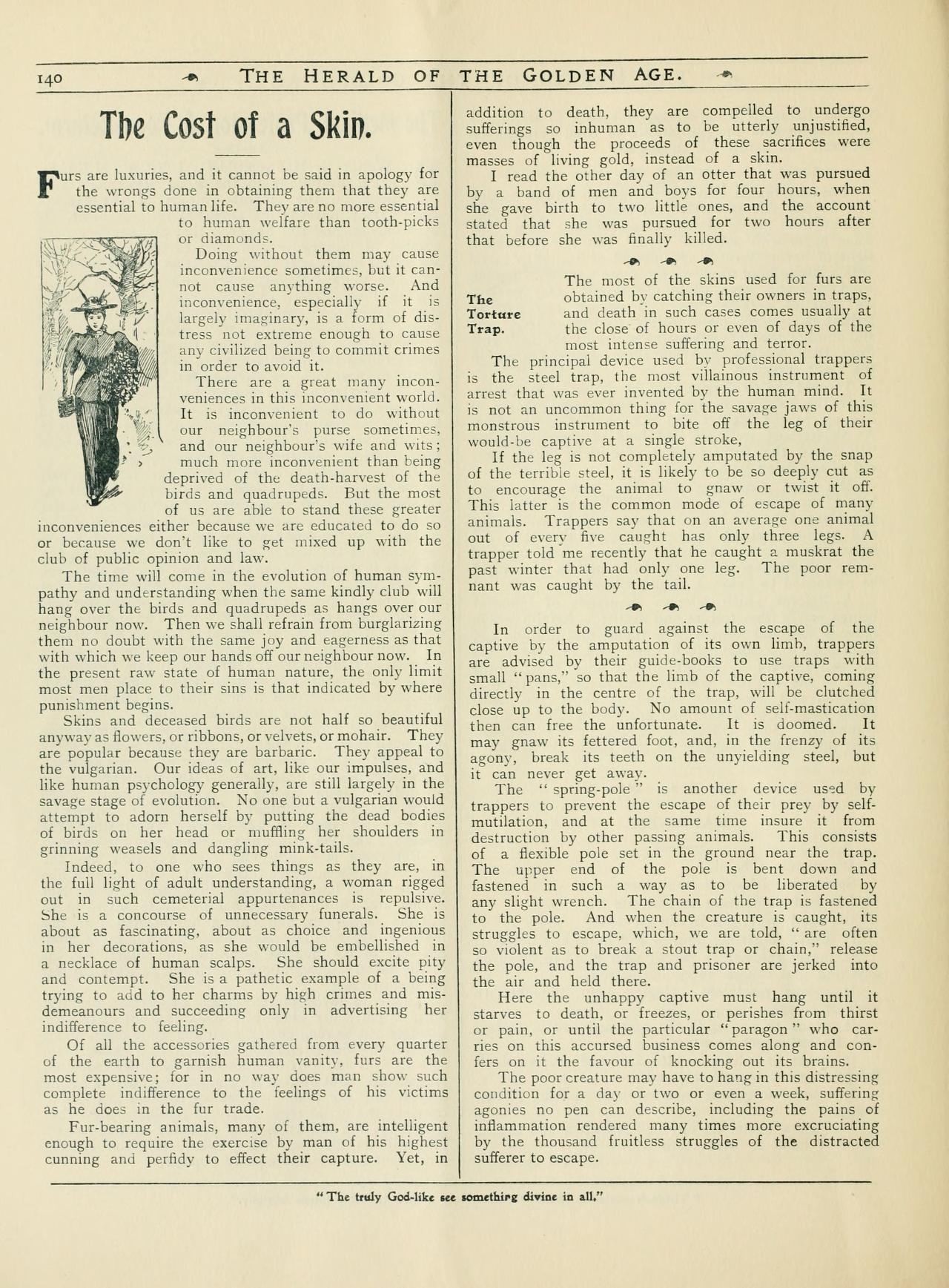
"The Cost of a Skin" in The Herald of the Golden Age, July 1907

"The Cost of a Skin" appeared in 1907 as a chapter in Moore's book The New Ethics, published in London by Ernest Bell. It was also published in the July 1907 issue of The Herald of the Golden Age, the periodical of the Order of the Golden Age, which issued the essay separately as a pamphlet.

The Animals' Friend Society of London included the essay among its leaflets. It was listed in a catalogue of the society's publications reproduced in John Galsworthy's The Treatment of Animals and Other Essays (1913). An edition was also issued by the American Humane Association.

In 1912, the Millenium Guild published a leaflet version of the essay.

The Animal Defence and Anti-Vivisection Society subsequently issued an expanded pamphlet edition. An eight-page copy is held in the Animal Rights and Animal Welfare Pamphlets, 1874–1952 collection at North Carolina State University Libraries. The pamphlet is undated, but the University of Geneva's Vegan Literary Studies project dates it to approximately 1939, based on a statement that the issuing society had been founded 33 years earlier.

According to the project, the later pamphlet was based on the Millenium Guild's 1912 leaflet. It rearranged some of the concluding paragraphs and included additional material. The different versions therefore vary in both arrangement and content.

== Content ==
Moore argues that wearing animal fur and feathers for ornament is a remnant of what he calls "the savage stage of evolution". He compares clothing decorated with animal bodies to ornaments made from human scalps, questioning the distinction between customs regarded as barbaric and the treatment of animals in contemporary fashion. He also criticizes the use of animal remains as decorative objects and the suffering inflicted to obtain them.

Much of the essay describes methods of trapping animals for fur. Moore discusses steel traps, spring poles, sliding poles, and deadfalls, describing how animals caught in them may suffer prolonged pain, hunger, thirst, exposure, or terror before dying or being killed. He writes that animals caught by their limbs sometimes attempt to escape by gnawing or twisting them off. Moore estimates that 30 million animals are killed annually for fur and describes a method of trapping ermines using greased iron in freezing conditions, causing their tongues to adhere to the metal.

Moore asks readers to imagine humans being hunted by a race of physically superior beings that set traps throughout their surroundings. In his hypothetical example, humans must sometimes mutilate themselves to escape, while those who remain trapped are killed so that parts of their bodies can be worn as ornaments. The comparison is intended to present the suffering inflicted upon animals from the perspective of those subjected to it.

Moore also advocates alternatives to clothing made from animal materials. He suggests that plush could replace fur and that silk-like fibres could be manufactured from wood. He states that a form of vegetable-based leather had already been manufactured in London and predicts that growing demand would encourage the production of footwear made from plant materials. He argues that such alternatives could be more economical, hygienic and comfortable than conventional footwear, and anticipates a time when clothing would be produced entirely without killing animals.

The essay also connects the use of leather with the consumption of meat. Moore describes leather as a by-product of slaughter and criticizes the economic incentives for using animal hides rather than developing alternatives. He argues that humans should direct their ingenuity towards replacing products obtained by killing animals, including both clothing materials and food. He concludes by reiterating that fur is neither necessary nor aesthetically desirable and condemns its continued use despite the suffering involved in its production.

== See also ==
- Anti-fur movement
- Opposition to hunting
