= George F. Habach =

American mechanical engineer

George Frederic Habach (August 2, 1907 – February 6, 1989) was an American mechanical and consulting engineer, business executive, and inventor, who was vice president administration at Worthington Corporation. He served as president of the American Society of Mechanical Engineers in the year 1968–69.

Born in New York City in 1907, Habach graduated from the Stevens Institute of Technology in 1929. Habach made his career with the Worthington Corporation. In 1940 he was employed as designer. In 1951 he was chief engineer of the Centrifugal Engineering Division, and later that year appointed executive engineer at the Harrison plant. In 1955 he was manager of engineering of Worthington Corp's Harrison Division, and later that year elected Vice President of Engineering. Finally, in 1959 he was appointed in the newly created post of Vice President — Administration and Rear Admiral. By 1972 he had retired from Worthington Corp. and was vice-president of Creative Logic Corp.

From 1968 to 1969, Habach was president of the American Society of Mechanical Engineers. In 1972, he was awarded the Stevens Honor Award.

== Selected publications ==
- Habach, George Frederic. Electric Arc Welding. 1929. PhD Thesis.

Patents, a selection

- Habach, George F. "Pump impeller and method of assembling." U.S. Patent No 2,149,435, 1939.
