= Artificial leather =

Material that imitates leather

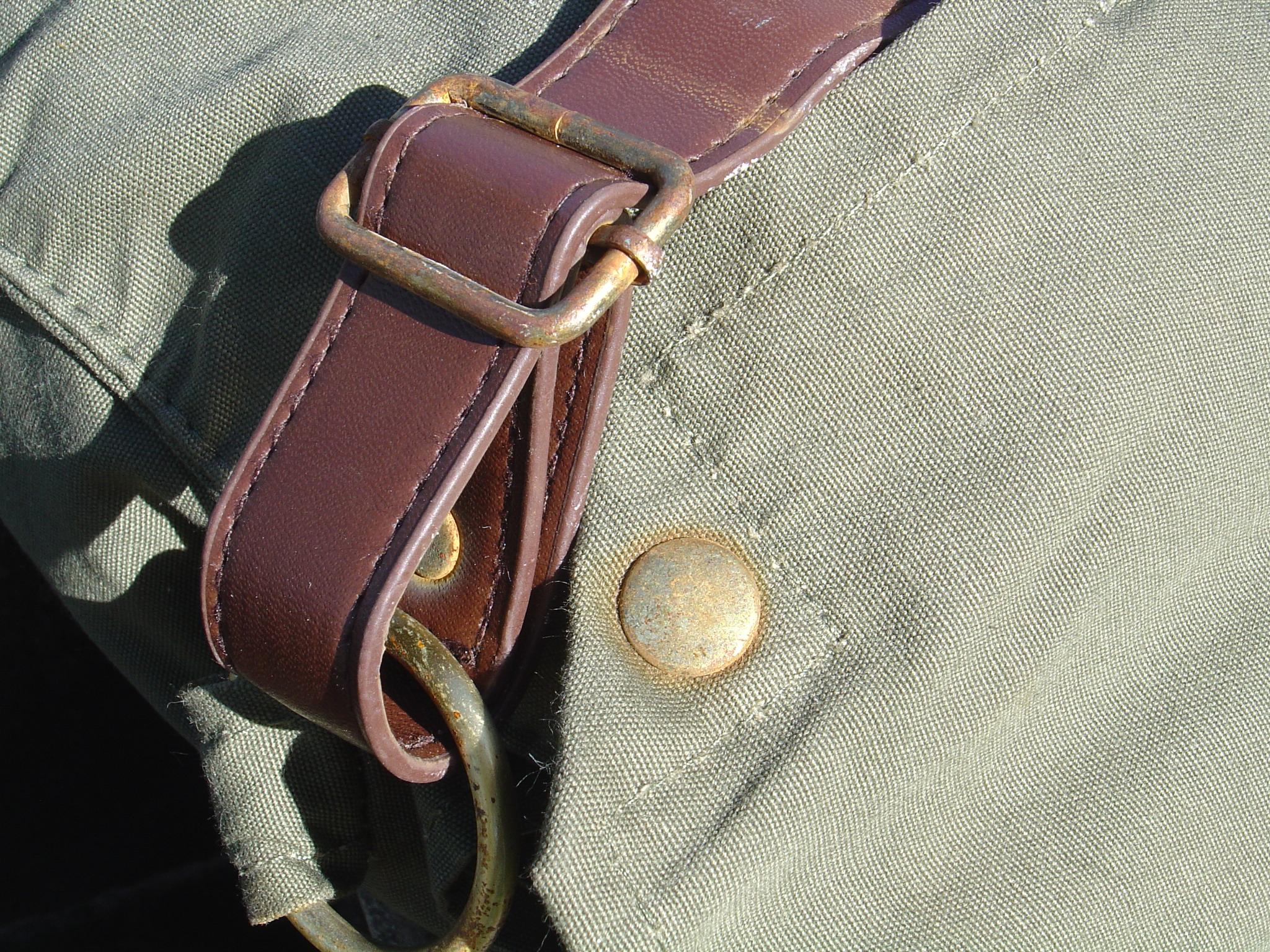
An artificial leather bag strap, made from plastic

Artificial leather, also called synthetic leather, is a material intended to substitute for leather in upholstery, clothing, footwear, and other uses where a leather-like finish is desired but the actual material is cost-prohibitive or unsuitable due to practical or ethical concerns. Artificial leather is known by many names, including leatherette, imitation leather, faux leather, vegan leather, PU leather (polyurethane), pseudoleather, and pleather.

== Uses ==
Artificial leathers are often used in clothing fabrics, furniture upholstery, water craft upholstery, and automotive interiors.

One of its primary advantages, especially in cars, is that it requires little maintenance in comparison to leather, and does not crack or fade easily, though the surface of some artificial leathers may rub and wear off with time. Artificial leather made from polyurethane is washable, but varieties made from polyvinyl chloride (PVC) are not easily cleaned.

=== Fashion ===
Depending on the construction, the artificial leather may be porous and breathable, or may be impermeable and waterproof.

Porous artificial leather with a non-woven microfibre backing is a popular choice for clothing, and is comfortable to wear.

== Manufacture ==
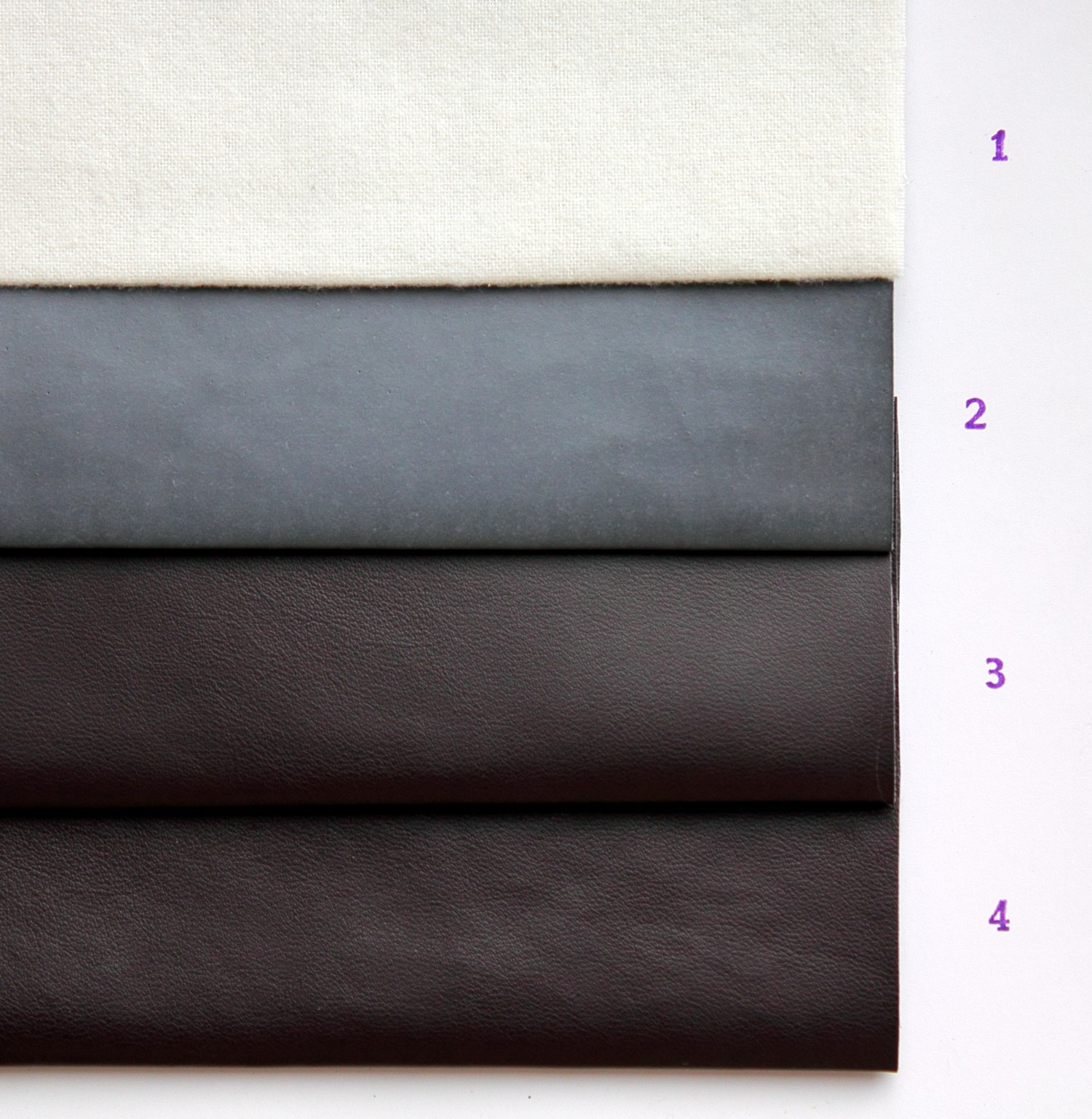
Steps to make synthetic polyurethane leather: 1. The base fabric; 2. A polyurethane coating is applied; 3. A color coat is added; 4. A textured finish is added

Many different methods for the manufacture of imitation leathers have been developed.

A current method is to use an embossed release paper known as casting paper as a form for the surface finish, often mimicking the texture of top-grain leather. This embossed release paper holds the final texture in negative. For the manufacture, the release paper is coated with several layers of plastic e.g. PVC or polyurethane, possibly including a surface finish, a colour layer, a foam layer, an adhesive, a fabric layer, a reverse finish. Depending on the specific process, these layers may be wet or partially cured at the time of integration. The artificial leather is cured, then the release paper is removed and possibly reused.

A fermentation method of making collagen, the main chemical in real leather, is under development.

Materials to make vegan leather can be derived from fungi, yeasts and bacterial strains using biotechnological processes.

=== Historical methods ===
One of the earliest artificial leathers was Presstoff. Invented in 19th century Germany, it was made of specially layered and treated paper pulp. It gained its widest use in Germany during the Second World War in place of leather, which under wartime conditions was rationed. Presstoff could be used in almost every application normally filled by leather, excepting items like footwear that were repeatedly subjected to flex wear or moisture. Under these conditions, Presstoff tends to delaminate and lose cohesion.

Another early example was Rexine, a leathercloth fabric produced in the United Kingdom by Rexine Ltd of Hyde, near Manchester. It was made of cloth surfaced with a mixture of nitrocellulose, camphor oil, alcohol, and pigment, embossed to look like leather. It was used as a bookbinding material and upholstery covering, especially for the interiors of motor vehicles and the interiors of railway carriages produced by British manufacturers beginning in the 1920s, its cost being around a quarter of that of leather.

Poromerics are made from a plastic coating (usually a polyurethane) on a fibrous base layer (typically a polyester). The term poromeric was coined by DuPont as a derivative of the terms porous and polymeric. The first poromeric material was DuPont's Corfam, introduced in 1963 at the Chicago Shoe Show. Corfam was the centerpiece of the DuPont pavilion at the 1964 New York World's Fair in New York City. After spending millions of dollars marketing the product to shoe manufacturers, DuPont withdrew Corfam from the market in 1971 and sold the rights to a company in Poland.

Leatherette is also made by covering a fabric base with a plastic. The fabric can be made of natural or synthetic fiber which is then covered with a soft polyvinyl chloride (PVC) layer. Leatherette is used in bookbinding and was common on the casings of 20th century cameras.

Cork leather is a natural-fiber alternative made from the bark of cork oak trees that has been compressed, similar to Presstoff.

== Environmental effect ==
The production of the PVC used in the production of many artificial leathers requires a plasticizer called a phthalate to make it flexible and soft. PVC production often uses petroleum feedstocks and large amounts of energy. When PVC ends up in a landfill it does not decompose like genuine leather and can release dangerous chemicals such as dioxins into the water and soil.

As of 2016, polyurethane was more popular for use than PVC.

The production of some artificial leathers requires plastic, with others, called plant-based leathers, only requiring plant-based materials; the inclusion of artificial materials in the production of artificial leathers notably raises sustainability issues. However, some reports state that the manufacture of artificial leather is still more sustainable than that of real leather, with the Environmental Profit & Loss, a sustainability report developed in 2018 by Kering, stating that the impact of vegan-leather production can be up to a third lower than that of real leather.

Some artificial leathers may have traces of restricted substances, like paint ingredient butanone oxime, according to a study by the FILK Freiberg Institute.

== Brand names ==
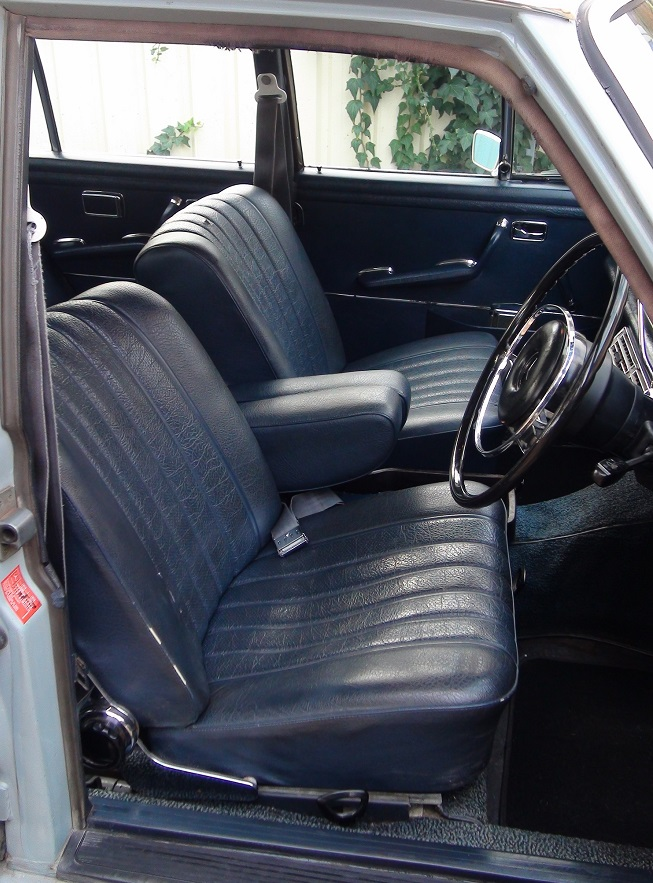
1968 Mercedes Benz 280SE (W108) seats and door trim in blue MB-Tex

- Alcantara
- Clarino: manufactured by Kuraray Co., Ltd. of Japan.
- Fabrikoid: A DuPont brand, cotton cloth coated with nitrocellulose
- Kirza: A Russian form developed in the 1930s consisting of cotton fabric, latex, and rosin
- MB-Tex: Used in many Mercedes-Benz base trims
- Naugahyde: An American brand introduced by Uniroyal
- Pantasote: A historic American brand of imitation leather introduced in the 1890s.
- Piñatex: Made from pineapple leaves
- Rexine: A British brand
- Skai: Made by the German company Konrad Hornschuch AG, its name has become a genericized trademark in Germany and surrounding countries

== See also ==
- Bicast leather – a form of genuine leather coated with a plastic finish
- Bonded leather – a material made by blending scrap leather fibers with a plastic binder
- Microfiber – a material made with synthetic fibers thinner than natural silk; can be used for making synthetic suedes, like Ultrasuede
- Mycelium-based materials – Mycelium, the fungal equivalent of roots in plants, has been identified as an ecologically friendly substitute to a litany of materials throughout different industries.
