= Derald Ruttenberg =

American lawyer (1916–2004)

Derald H. Ruttenberg
- Derald H. Ruttenberg in 1999, by Bill Cunningham, The New York Times
- Born: 17 February 1916; Lafayette, Indiana
- Died: 19 September 2004 (aged 88); Mount Sinai Medical Center, New York City
- Education: University of Wisconsin–Madison (BA); Yale University (LLB); Harvard University (MBA)
- Known for: Studebaker-Worthington merger
- Spouse: Janet Ruttenberg
- Children: John, Eric, Kathy, and Hattie

Derald H. Ruttenberg (17 February 1916 – 19 September 2004) was an American lawyer and businessman who became a deal maker, organizing large industrial mergers. He arranged the merger of Studebaker and Worthington Corporation, and for some time ran the combined Studebaker-Worthington. He provided the financing for the Derald H. Ruttenberg Cancer Center at Mount Sinai Hospital, New York.

== Early years ==
Ruttenberg was born on 17 February 1916 in Lafayette, Indiana. He studied philosophy at the University of Wisconsin, graduating in 1937. He went on to the Yale Law School where he earned an LL.B in 1940, then earned a business degree from the Harvard University Graduate School of Business in 1942. He served in the U.S. Air Force during World War II (1939–1945) and served in Europe in the U.S. Strategic Bombing Survey. He received an honorable discharge as a lieutenant in 1945.

== Early career ==
After leaving the military, Ruttenberg practiced law in Chicago. He then became owner of a number of privately held industrial companies in the American Midwest. He borrowed the money to make his purchases, using methods that foreshadowed leveraged buy-out firms. He avoided publicity and focused on basic industries where he saw hidden potential, such as foundries and private manufacturers. In the 1960s and 1970s Ruttenberg was one of the larger players during a wave of corporate acquisitions, and built up a large and liquid personal portfolio. He moved to New York where he became chairman of I-T-E Circuit Breaker in 1967.

== Studebaker-Worthington ==
In 1967 Ruttenberg arranged the merger between Studebaker and Worthington. He took the risk of buying Studebaker despite the liabilities that came with it, including dealer warranties and union agreements. He saw that Onan generators and STP engine additives were healthy businesses. The large tax loss was also valuable. Worthington was expected to continue to earn steady profits, but could use the tax loss to avoid paying taxes. The combined 1966 gross revenues of the two companies had been $672 million, with net income of $24.5 million. Studebaker was acquired by Wagner Electric, which in turn was merged with Worthington Corporation to create Studebaker-Worthington.

In January 1969 Ruttenberg became president and chief executive officer. He was determined to weed out all poorly performing units. He pushed the operating subsidiaries to maximize returns to shareholders, reportedly demanding returns as high as 25% - 30%. The Alco Products Division, a railway locomotive manufacturer, became a victim of Ruttenberg's drive for profit. The locomotive factory in Schenectady, New York, was closed in 1969, and White Motor Corporation purchased the diesel engine business in February 1970. Early in 1969 Studebaker-Worthington floated STP as a public corporation, listed on the American Stock Exchange. Worthington had acquired the air conditioning manufacturer Climatrol Air Coils Ltd. of Oakville, Ontario, in 1966. It was sold to Fedders in November 1970. Fedders was mainly interested in the brand, product designs and sales force, and shut down the manufacturing facilities.

Ruttenberg became chairman and chief executive officer of Studebaker-Worthington in 1971. McGraw-Edison purchased Studebaker-Worthington in 1978. Ruttenberg left the company in 1980. McGraw-Edison was in turn acquired by Cooper Industries in 1985.

== Later career ==
While at Studebaker-Worthington, Ruttenberg was a member of the Deepdale Country Club on Long Island, where he played golf. One of his golfing partners was Ted Forstmann, who arranged for Ruttenberg to meet Henry Kravis and Jerry Kohlberg of the start-up Kohlberg Kravis Roberts. Kravis and Kohlberg proposed what they called a leveraged buyout. After the two had left, Ruttenberg suggested that Forstmann could do the same himself. Ruttenberg arranged funding for Forstmann, who launched the LBO firm Forstmann Little & Company in 1978. Fortsmann took to heart the principle that Ruttenberg had defined when he said, "I have a reputation, it's all I have, and I don't want to lose that reputation."

From 1980 to 1982 Ruttenberg was chairman of the Madison Fund, an investment fund. After a financial reconstruction of the Weir Group in 1981, Ruttenberg and Jacob Rothschild gained effective control of 40% of the company. Ruttenberg became a board member. In 1982 he became chairman of his family's investment firm, Tinicum Inc. His son Eric later succeeded him in this position.

Ruttenberg was successfully treated for lymphoma at Mount Sinai Hospital, and in 1986 he donated $7 million (equivalent to $20,600,000 in 2025) to found centers for cancer research and treatment at the hospital. Later he donated an additional $8 million. The Derald H. Ruttenberg Treatment Center at Mount Sinai gives outpatient care to patients with all types of cancer other than breast cancer, and with benign hematologic conditions. It specializes in hematologic cancers such as leukemia, lymphoma, multiple myeloma, and myeloproliferative disorders. Ruttenberg gave a donation to Yale Law School, which thoroughly restored and renovated its Wall Street wing, renamed Ruttenberg Hall. He also endowed the Derald H. Ruttenberg Professorial Lectureship at Yale Law School in 1993.

Ruttenberg died at Mount Sinai from complications of lung cancer on 19 September 2004, aged 88. He was survived by his wife, Janet, and four children.
