= Janet Ruttenberg =

American painter

Janet K. Ruttenberg (born 1931) is an American painter and the widow of New York financier Derald Ruttenberg. She works mostly in plein air in Central Park on oversize canvas. She had her first museum exhibition in 2013 at the Museum of the City of New York. She expressed that had not been interested in exhibiting her work prior to this show.

Her daughter is the artist Kathy Ruttenberg.
