= Studebaker-Worthington =

American diversified manufacturer (1967–1979)

- Industry: Manufacturing
- Predecessors: Studebaker Corporation; Packard Motor Car Company; Wagner Electric; Worthington Corporation
- Founded: 1967
- Defunct: 1979
- Fate: Acquired by McGraw-Edison
- Headquarters: United States

Studebaker-Worthington was a diversified American manufacturer created in 1967 through a merger of Studebaker Corporation, Wagner Electric and Worthington Corporation. The company was in turn acquired by McGraw-Edison in 1979. The merger was arranged by the entrepreneur Derald Ruttenberg, who became president and chief executive officer in 1969.

== Origins ==
Founded in 1852, Studebaker began as a wagon manufacturer which eventually entered the automobile business in the early 1900s. However, since the early 1950s sales had been steadily declining resulting in a lack of funds to develop new models. In December 1963 Randolph H. Guthrie, chairman of Studebaker, (Note: Robert Guthrie was also a partner of the law firm of Nixon, Guthrie, Mudge and Mitchell. His partner, Richard Nixon, was to become President of the USA. Another partner, John N. Mitchell, became Attorney General.) announced that the company was closing down its automobile factory in South Bend Indiana, where it had made cars for 50 years, but would continue to make cars in Hamilton, Ontario. In 1965 auto sales were slightly less than $45 million. On 4 March 1966 Studebaker announced the termination of auto production after less than 9,000 1966 models had been produced. Management said the decision was due to "heavy and irreversible losses" in the automobile division.

Business results for 1966 had total sales of $172 million, excluding automobile sales. Automobile sales for 1965 had been slightly less than $45 million. Net income for 1966 was $16.4 million, much more than the previous year. The company was now profitable, and also had tax loss carry-forwards that made it an attractive target for a takeover. Studebaker further improved its position by selling off some unprofitable businesses. The most profitable of the divisions that remained were Clarke Floor Machines, Gravely Tractor, Schaefer Chemical Compounds (later to become STP Corporation) and Onan.

== Formation ==
The 1967 merger that created the company was arranged by the entrepreneur Derald Ruttenberg, who took the risk of buying Studebaker despite the liabilities that came with it, including dealer warranties and union agreements. He saw that Onan generators and STP engine additives were healthy businesses. The large tax loss was also valuable. Worthington was expected to continue to earn steady profits, but could use the tax loss to avoid paying taxes.

The stockholders of Studebaker and Worthington approved the merger despite rumors that the Federal Trade Commission considered the merger would be "substantially anti-competitive". The combined 1966 gross revenues of the two companies had been $672 million, with net income of $24.5 million. Studebaker was acquired by Wagner Electric, which in turn was merged with Worthington Corporation to create Studebaker-Worthington. The merger was completed in November 1967, creating a company with $550 million of assets. The combined company included the profitable divisions from Studebaker, brake and electrical automobile component manufacturing from Wagner Electric, and diverse operations from Worthington that included manufacture of construction equipment, valves and power generation plant.

== History ==
The former chairman of Worthington, Frank J. Nunlist, was appointed president and chief executive officer. Randolph Guthrie of Studebaker was chairman of the new company. 1967 sales were over $650 million. In January 1969 the board of directors replaced Nunlist with Derald H. Ruttenberg as president and chief executive officer. Ruttenberg determined to weed out all poorly performing units. He treated the company as an investment fund, and pushed the operating subsidiaries to maximize returns to shareholders, reportedly demanding returns as high as 25% - 30%.

The Alco Products Division, a railway locomotive manufacturer, became a victim of Ruttenberg's drive for profit. The locomotive factory in Schenectady, New York, was closed in 1969, and White Motor Corporation purchased the diesel engine business in February 1970. Studebaker-Worthington retained a 52% stake in MLW-Worthington of Canada, formerly the Montreal Locomotive Works. MLW-Worthington continued to build diesel locomotives, mainly for the Canadian market, using Alco designs. Sales at STP had exceeded $43 million in 1968. Early in 1969 Studebaker-Worthington floated STP as a public corporation, listed on the American Stock Exchange. Worthington had acquired the air conditioning manufacturer Climatrol Air Coils Ltd. of Oakville, Ontario, in 1966. Climatrol was earning $50–$60 million annually, but needed large investments to grow to the size needed to compete with the giant manufacturers in the field. Instead, it was sold to Fedders in November 1970. Fedders was mainly interested in the brand, product designs and sales force, and shut down the manufacturing facilities.

Weir Group, a British company engaged in pump manufacture, had been looking to buy Worthington as far back as 1938. In December 1968 they made an offer for the Newark-based Worthington Simpson pump manufacturer. After complex negotiations, Weir acquired 50% of Worthington Simpson in 1969. A new company was established named Worthington-Weir for American pump manufacture. (Note: In 1985 Dresser Industries acquired Worthington-Simpson. In 1992 it became part of Ingersoll Dresser Pumps. As of 2006 the Newark-based pump manufacturer was called Flowserve Pumps.)

In 1973, Studebaker-Worthington reached sales of $1 billion. In 1974, MLW-Worthington arranged to sell 25 locomotives to Cuba for $15 million. Studebaker-Worthington required a permit under the Trading with the Enemy Act, which was denied. The government of Pierre Trudeau protested strongly against interference by the U.S. government in exports by a Canadian company. In the end the U.S. government under Gerald Ford backed down and issued a license after receiving a formal note from the Canadian government that pointed out the U.S. had promised "to be as accommodating as possible with respect to such cases to avoid a jurisdictional conflict between the laws and policies of the two governments."

McGraw-Edison purchased Studebaker-Worthington in 1978. McGraw-Edison was in turn acquired by Cooper Industries in 1985. Coopers Industries was acquired by Eaton Corporation in 2012.
