= Plant-based leather =

Type of material made from plants

Plant-based leather, also known as vegan leather or eco-leather, is a group of non-animal materials made from plant sources (e.g. pineapple leaves, cactus, cork, or apple by-products) that aim to replicate some properties of animal leather. The term "vegan leather" is broader and also includes plastic-based artificial leather (e.g. PU or PVC). The growing interest in sustainable and environmentally friendly products has led to increased demand for plant-based leather in recent years.

In some jurisdictions, the word "leather" is legally reserved for products of animal origin. In 2025, Germany’s Higher Regional Court of Cologne held that marketing plastic-based goods as "Apfelleder" (“apple leather”) was misleading. More broadly, the EU’s "Empowering Consumers" Directive (EU) 2024/825 restricts unsubstantiated generic environmental claims (e.g., “environmentally friendly”, “biodegradable”), tightening oversight of product marketing across categories.

== Apple leather ==
Apple leather, also known as AppleSkin, is a plant-based leather invented by Alberto Volcan from Bolzano, Italy. Working with waste recycling company, Frumat, and manufacturer, Mabel, Volcan's research on turning waste from the apple industry into usable material began in 2004. The first products made with apple leather were manufactured in 2019, and is most commonly used for small accessories like wallets. One of the leading production companies in Apple leather is OLIVER CO, based in Bermondsey, South London; The company creates sustainable accessory such as wallets, cardholders, phone cases, etc.

=== Production ===
There are two processes that can turn apple waste into leather. The first process turns the apple waste into a purée which is then spread flat on a sheet and dehydrated; next the sheet is combined with polyurethane to add durability. The second process turns the apple waste into a powder, which is then combined with polyurethane and coated onto a cotton and polyester backing.

=== Sustainability ===
AppleSkin apple leather is PETA approved Vegan, USDA Biopreferred approved, and OEKO-TEX certified. Despite the name, apple leather is not entirely biodegradable. After being combined with polyurethane, the leather is only 50% plant-based. However apple leather production emits less carbon dioxide (CO_{2}) than PU leather; for every 1 kilogram (2.2 pounds) of apple waste used as a substitute for PU, 5.28 kilograms (11.6 pounds) of CO_{2} is saved. The majority of the sustainability that comes from apple leather is in its consumption of waste; by repurposing part of the 4 million metric tones per year³ of waste that comes from apple peels and stalks, the process keeps the surplus from decomposing and producing methane, which contributes to climate change.

== Cactus leather ==
Cactus leather is a plant-based leather produced from the mature leaves of the nopal (prickly-pear) cactus native to Mexico. Founded by entrepreneurs Adrián López Velarde and Marte Cázarez, Desserto was the first company to manufacture cactus leather. Their goal was to create a sustainable material that fit the specifications required by the industries that utilize animal and/or synthetic leather. Following two years of research and development, the leather was completed in July 2019 and was first showcased in Milan, Italy in October 2019, and is now used in a variety of fashion and automotive products, marking a significant step towards sustainable alternatives in these industries.

=== Production ===
Cactus only needs 200 liters of water to have a growth of one kilogram of biomass; those 200 liters are absorbed by the plant from the humidity of the environment without having to irrigate the plant. The hygroscopic mechanism of the cactus absorbs CO_{2} during night because only the environment is fresh. The plant opens its stoma capturing CO_{2}, generating oxygen and absorbing water present in the atmosphere which normally comes from the morning dew. The process of cultivating cactus leather has several steps. First, the mature pads of the cactus are harvested, cleaned, and ground down. Next, the pads are dried under the sun for three to five days. Then, fibers are separated from the dried pads and mixed with chemicals to form a bio-resin, which is then poured over a carrier such as cotton or polyester. Winner Nippon leatherette Pvt. Ltd. manufactures cactus leather in India.

=== Sustainability ===
Desserto cactus leather is mostly biodegradable, consisting of 92% organic carbon content and has a tested durability of ten years. Most steps in the cactus leather production process are also sustainable in practice; the 56,656 square meters (14.000 acres) Desserto farm generates only 13.88 tonnes (15.30 short tons) of carbon dioxide annually while absorbing over 7,257 tonnes (8,000 short tons) per year. When harvesting the mature leaves, the cactus is not harmed, so it continues to grow. The cacti do not require herbicides or pesticides. Of the 200 liters (53 U.S. gal) of water required to grow 1 kilogram (2.2 pounds) of cactus biomass, the majority is absorbed naturally from atmospheric humidity.

== Cork leather ==
Cork leather is a plant-based leather made from bark harvested from cork oak trees native to many parts of Europe. There is little information regarding which company originally created the idea for cork leather, but current companies that produce it include Mahi Leather in Kanpur, Northern India, and HZcork located in Dongguan, China which produces both cork leather and cork fabrics.

=== Production ===
The process for harvesting and manufacturing cork leather is much simpler than apple and cactus leather. First, the cork tree bark is stripped into planks, these planks are then air-dried for six months; next the boards are boiled in water and pressed into thinner sheets. After this, the sheet of cork is adhered onto a fabric backing, usually cotton or polyester, with suberin, an adhesive naturally produced by the cork. When extra durability is needed, the cork is bonded to the backing with polyurethane, which decreases the fabric's biodegradability.

=== Sustainability ===
Both Mahi brand cork leather and HZcork brand leather have a sustainable production process. When done correctly, the oak is not harmed when the bark is harvested; additionally, a single cork tree will produce usable bark for over 200 years. The process of turning bark into leather does not involve toxic chemicals nor does it emit pollution; cork trees also do not release harmful chemicals when burned. The downside to the use of cork leather are that it is not as durable as animal leather, and despite being one of the most environmentally friendly plant-based leathers, it is underutilized by fashion companies due to its unique texture.

== Grape leather ==
Grape leather is a plant-based leather made from grape pomace, a by-product of winemaking, combined with other agricultural products. The company Vegea was founded in 2015 by Francesco Marlino and produces a grape leather called GrapeSkin. It is highly biodegradable.

== Mushroom leather ==
Mushroom leather is a non-animal leather made from mycelium, the vegetative filaments that make up the branches of fungi. Mushroom leather was first developed in 2013 by Philip Ross and Jonas Edvard and called MYX, which was made from the waste of the oyster mushroom industry. About 280 thousand square meters (3.0 million square feet) of mushroom leather is produced per year, at an average of $50.00 per square foot ($540.00 per square meter). Current mushroom leather producers include Mylo by Bolt Threads, MycoWorks, which patented their product in 2015, and MuSkin. Mushroom leather is primarily produced in Indonesia.

=== Production ===
Mushroom leather has one of the most complicated production processes of the plant-based leathers. First the substrate, the materials used as food for the mushroom, such as corn or any agriculture waste, is put into a bag, dampened, and pasteurized; this causes the mycelium to grow and colonize the substrate for two to three weeks, at which point it is harvested. The harvested mycelium is then compressed; during the compression, dyes or textures can be added to create the desired color and texture.

This complex manufacturing process has proven challenging for companies attempting to scale up production. Bolt Threads announced in 2023 that they were halting investment in Mylo due to issues attracting the investment necessary to achieve commercial scale. MycoWorks halted production at its Union, South Carolina factory twice in 2024 due to contamination from a fungus that infected the mycelium used to create its raw textile product.

=== Sustainability ===
The main bonuses of sustainability in the production of mushroom leather come from the fact that the production is closed-loop, which means that the materials needed to make the substrate can come from consumer or industry waste, and that the end product can also be repurposed as fertilizer. Mylo brand mushroom leather is 80% bio based without synthetic backings or adhesives. In most cases, mushroom leathers are completely biodegradable; however, similar to cork leathers, when extra durability is needed, the mushroom leather is reinforced with polyurethane, which decreases its biodegradability.

In 2022, Stella McCartney released the Frayme Mylo handbag, the first commercially available luxury bag crafted entirely from Mylo mushroom leather, with production limited to just 200 numbered pieces.

== Pineapple leather ==
Pineapple leather is a plant-based leather made from the cellulose fibers of pineapple leaves. The pineapple leather, Piñatex, was developed by Carmen Hijosa and is produced by textile company Ananas Anam.

=== Production ===
To create the pineapple leather, the fibers are extracted from the leaves and felted together to produce a non-woven mat; the mat is then washed, pressed, and dyed; this is considered the raw Piñafelt. The felt is then combined with non-biodegradable polyurethane resin for durability.

=== Sustainability ===
Piñatex is a certified Benefit Corporation, B-Corp, meaning that the company is high in transparency, sustainability, and standards of performance. Production of pineapple leather emits less carbon dioxide than the production of traditional vegan leather, as each meter (3.28 feet) of Piñatex prevents 12 kilograms (26 pounds) of CO_{2} emissions. Despite the Piñafelt consisting of 100% plant-based materials, the combination with polyurethane in the final stage means that Piñatex will not naturally biodegrade.

== Additional leathers ==
Additional plant-based leathers, for which there is limited production information available, include agave, coffee, and olive leathers.

== See also ==
- Artificial leather
