= Bicast leather =

Plastic-coated leather material

Bicast leather (also spelled as bi-cast leather or bycast leather) is a material made with a split leather backing covered with an embossed layer of polyurethane or vinyl. Bicast leather was originally made for the apparel industry for glossy shoes, and was later adopted by the furniture industry.

== Production and features ==
The hide material used in the making of bicast is usually a portion of the fibrous, lower grade of leather that remains when the higher-grade grain layer is split off.

Bicast leather is produced by building up a layer of plastic (typically polyurethane) on top of an embossed release paper known as casting paper. Split leather is then pressed into the plastic. After the resultant bicast leather has cured, the casting paper is removed, and optionally re-used. The embossing usually gives the appearance of top grain leather, although it may be smooth depending on the desired finish.

New bicast leather can have a chemical odor, but this typically dissipates about a week after the piece is exposed to air.

The use of terms like "genuine leather" or "100% leather" in relation to bicast treatment is considered a misrepresentation and therefore not permitted in some countries, including the UK, Denmark, and New Zealand.

Furniture manufacturers say that the main benefit of bicast leather is its surface appearance at a low price. With constant use, however, the polyurethane layer may crack and split free of its backing, and abrasion may cause large unsightly marks.

== See also ==
- Artificial leather
- Bonded leather
