= Release liner =

Film that covers an adhesive before use

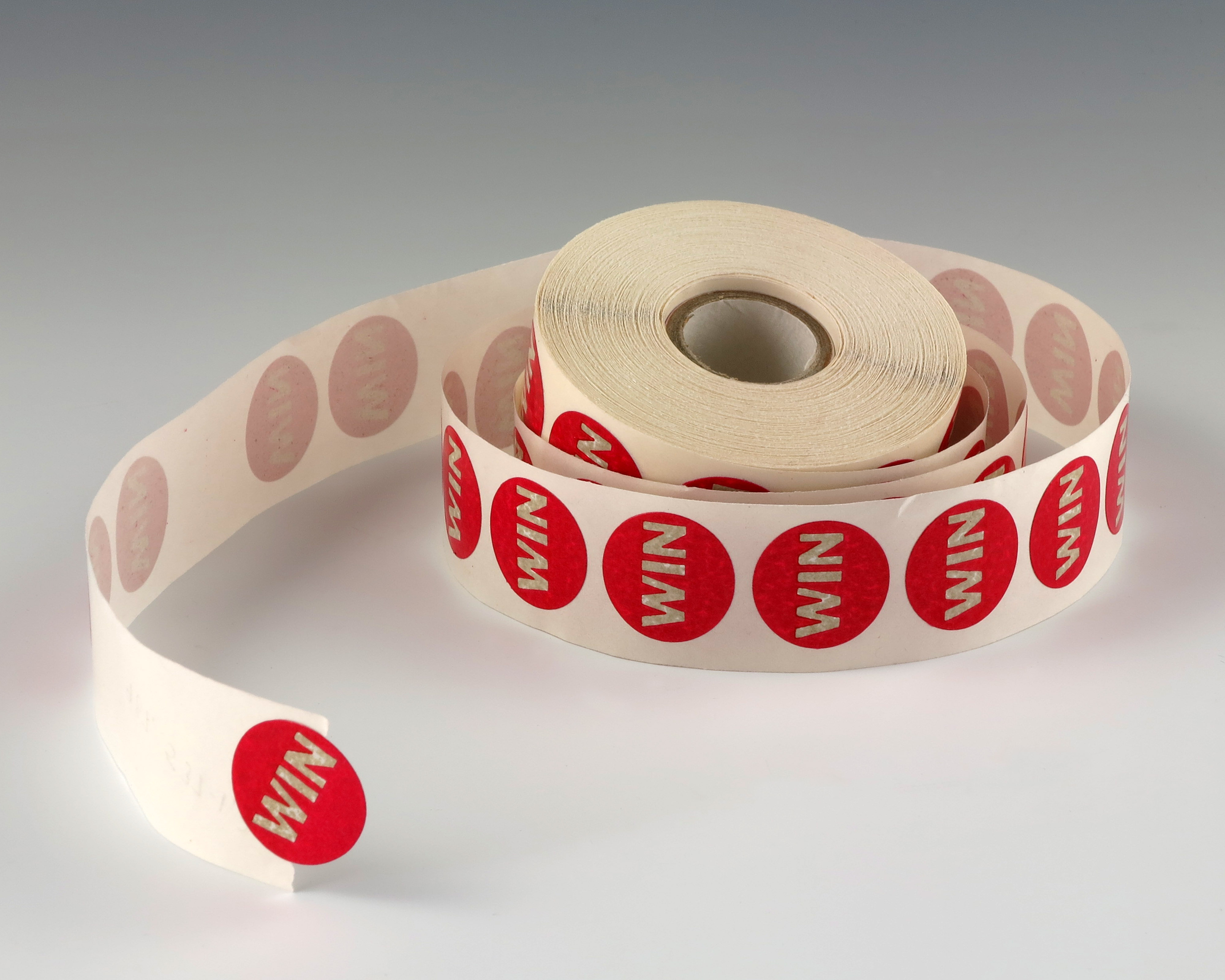
Roll of die-cut pressure-sensitive labels on a release liner

A release liner or release paper, also called a backing liner, is a paper or plastic-based film sheet (usually applied during the manufacturing process) used to prevent a sticky surface from prematurely adhering. It is coated on one or both sides with a release agent, which provides a release effect against any type of a sticky material such as an adhesive or a mastic. Release liners are available in different colors, with or without printing under the low surface energy coating or on the backside of the liner. Release is separation of the liner from a sticky material; liner is the carrier for the release agent.

== Industry segmentation ==
Globally there are between 400 and 500 companies involved in making or dealing with release liner products on an industrial scale. In general there are two types of companies which are manufacturing release liner.

=== Liner producer ===
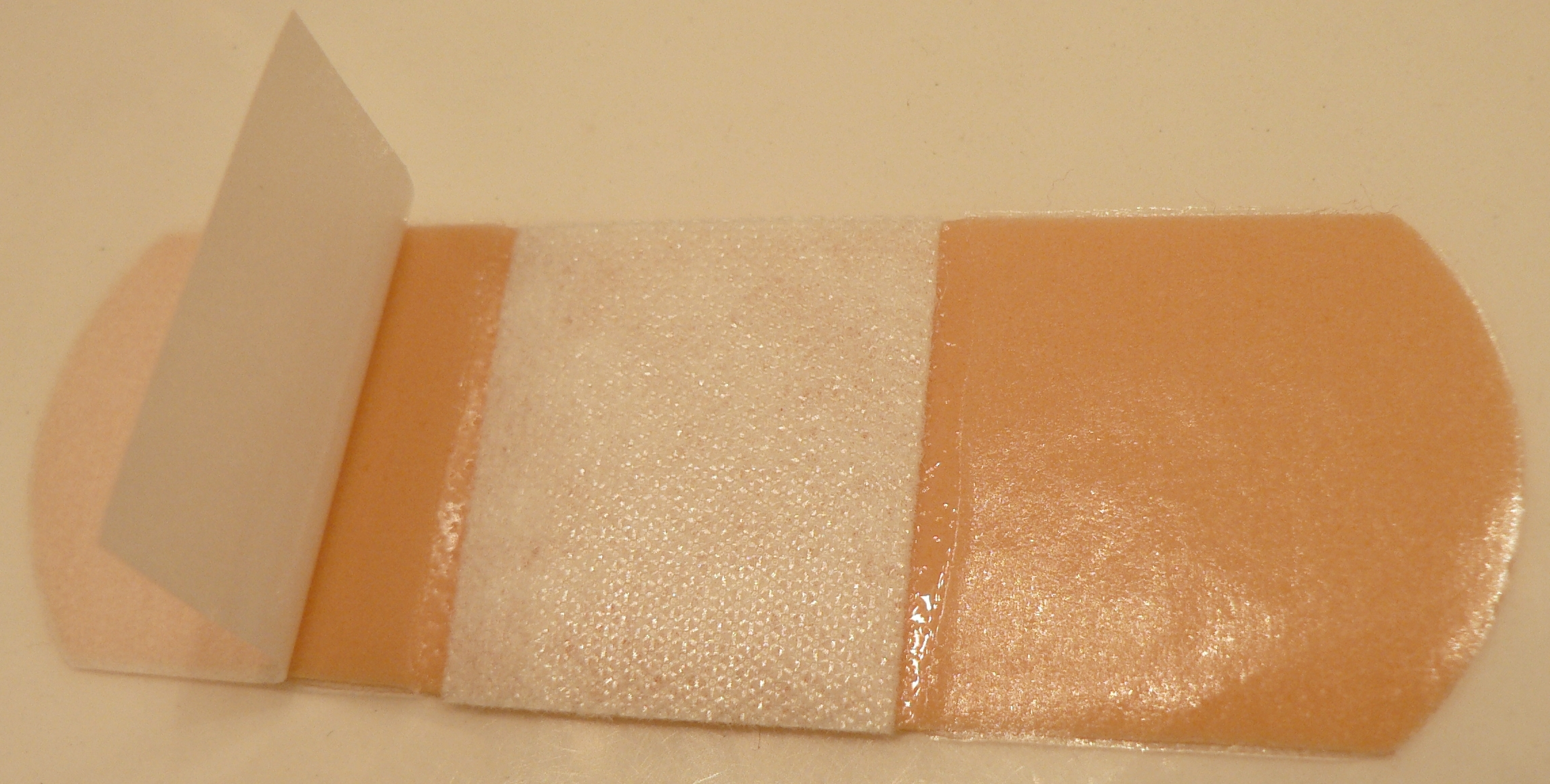
An adhesive bandage with a release liner partially removed

Liner producers provide for many different end uses of this industry, providing solutions to their customers based on a wide variety of substrates and release agents as needed by the customer. These producers usually do not make finished products, instead providing the materials required by their customers to apply to their own finished goods.

=== In-house producer ===
An in-house producer makes the release liner and uses it internally to manufacture the final product. In-house producers are typically focused on a very narrow range of products e.g. labels or tapes. They use a limited amount of substrates and release materials, which are specialized for their end applications.

== Liner materials ==
As liner material, the industry is using a wide variety of so-called substrates, which are the carrier materials of the release agent and which is needed to transport a sticky material from the manufacturer to an industrial or private end user. Typical liner materials are:

=== Paper ===
1. SCK - Super calendered Kraft paper, typically used for labels in the USA
2. Glassine - Is also a SCK paper but typically with a polyvinyl alcohol (PVOH) top coat, typically used for labels in Europe
3. CCK - Clay coated Kraft paper or also just called coated paper
4. MFK - Machine finished Kraft paper, which is the paper as it comes from a standard paper machine
5. MG - Machine glazed paper which is a paper which has been glazed, e.g. on a Yankee cylinder of a paper machine

=== Plastic film ===
1. BO-PET: a PET film (biaxially oriented) is a very high temperature resistant and tough film liner
2. BOPP: a biaxially oriented polypropylene (PP) film
3. Other polyolefins: typically made out of high density polyethylene (HDPE), low density polyethylene (LDPE), PP plastic resins

Plastic films in general are made out of plastic resins by a plastics extrusion process and can be made out of one single type of plastic material, a blend of different plastic materials or multilayered coextrusions. Providing them with unique and adjusted features for the application that they are targeted for.

=== Others ===
- Poly coated Kraft papers, which are typically MFK papers which have a polyolefin coating on one or both sides, to make them very smooth, moisture resistant and dimensionally stable.
- Poly coated BO-PET film, which is a BO-PET film that has been coated on both sides with a polyolefin material. This way the tough and dimensionally stable PET film is combined with cheap polyolefin resin which makes the film a better carrier web for specialty applications.

== Release agents ==
Commonly used release agents for release liner can be crosslinkable silicone, other coatings, and materials that have a low surface energy.

== Applications ==
There are probably hundreds of different applications, where release liner materials are being used. Such as

- Pressure-sensitive labels
- Pressure-sensitive tape
- Self-adhesive plastic sheet
- Embossed release paper known as casting paper is used in the manufacture of textured materials, including bicast leather and artificial leather

== See also ==
- Pressure-sensitive adhesive
