= Bonded leather =

Term for manufactured upholstery material which contains animal hide

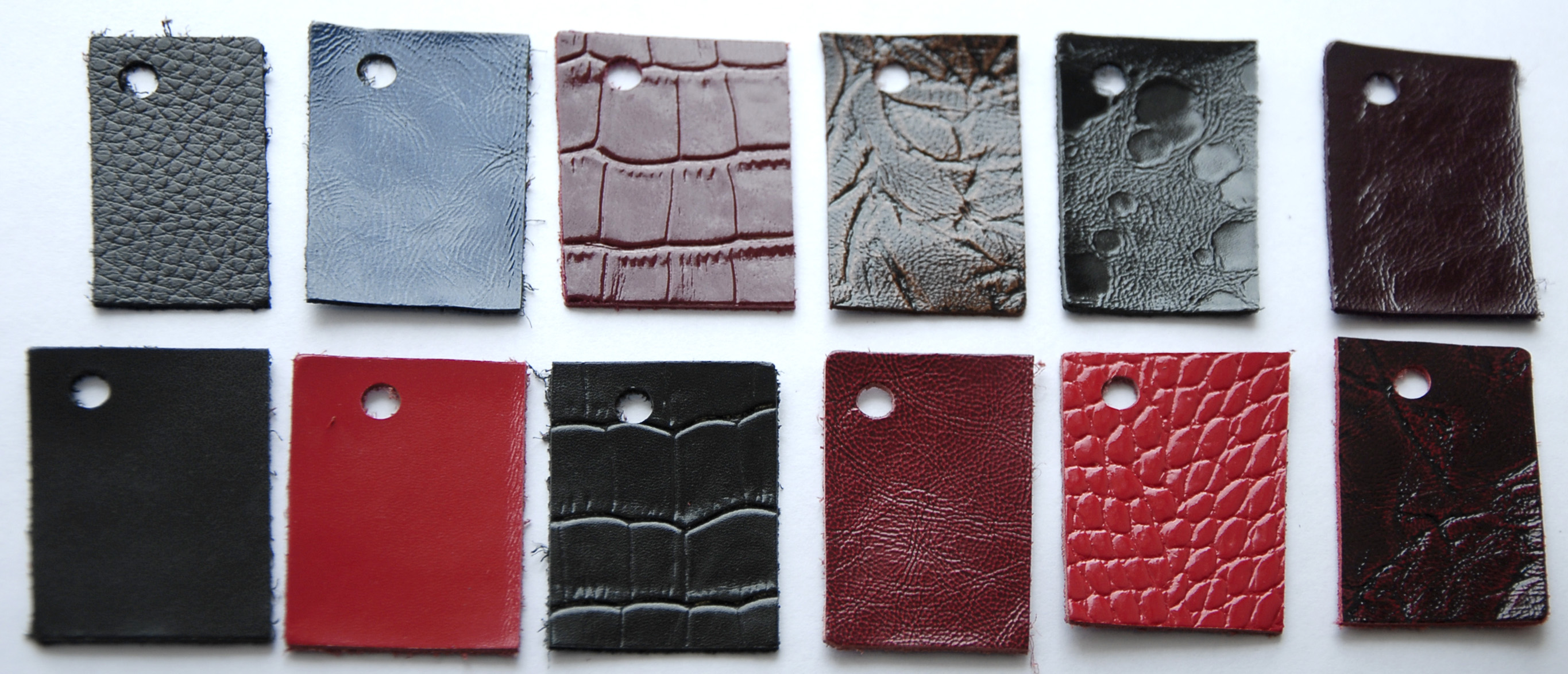
An array of bonded leather swatches, in various colors and patterns

Bonded leather, also called reconstituted leather, composition leather or blended leather, is a term used for a manufactured upholstery material which contains animal hide. It is made as a layered structure of a fiber or paper backer covered with a layer of shredded leather fibers mixed with natural rubber or a polyurethane binder that is embossed with a leather-like texture.

It differs from bicast leather, which is made from solid leather pieces, usually from the split, which are given an artificial coating. Bonded leather may be made in a similar manner using casting paper.

== Description ==
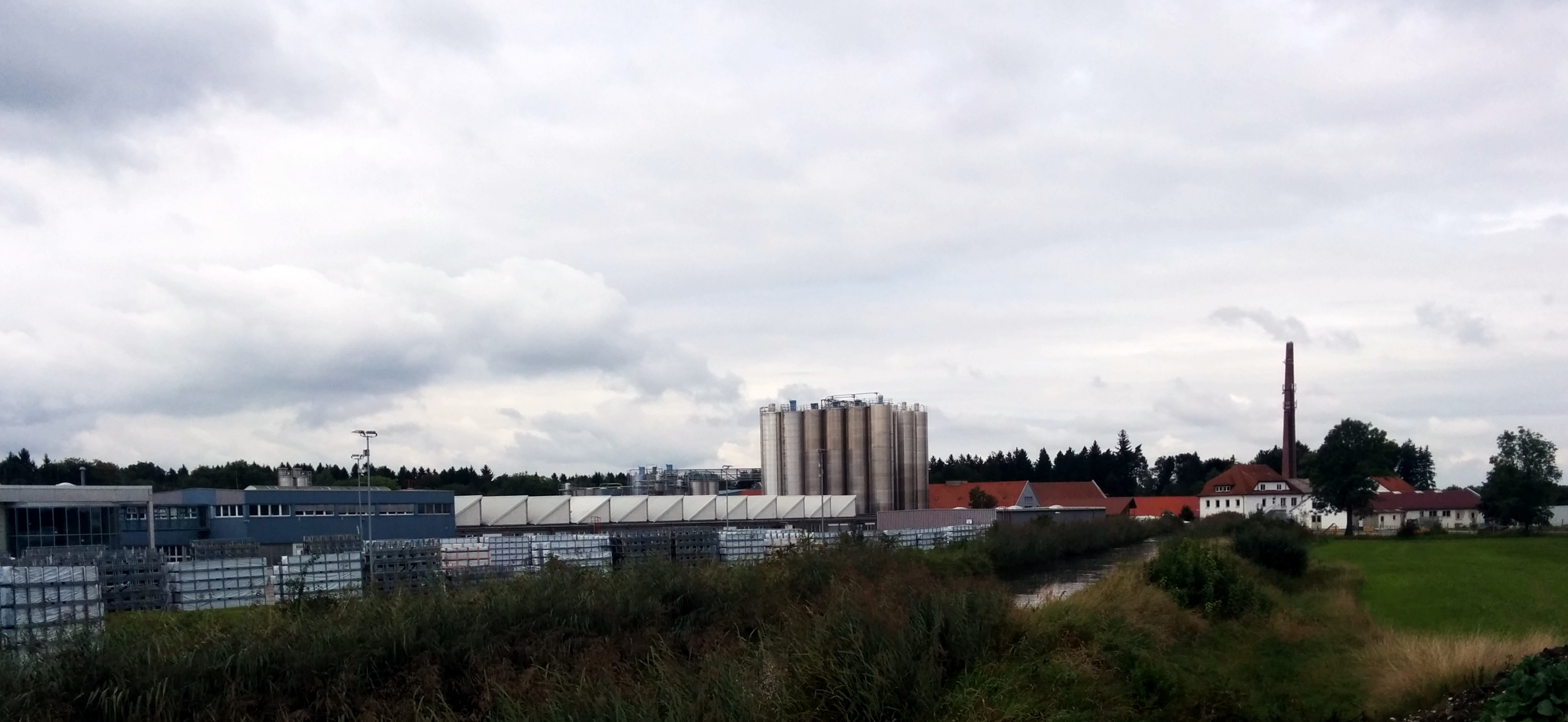
"Salamander Industrieprodukte" in Türkheim, Bavaria, is the oldest and biggest manufacturer of bonded leather fibre material worldwide.

Bonded leather is made by shredding leather scraps and leather fiber, then mixing it with bonding materials. The mixture is next extruded onto a cloth or paper backing, and the surface is usually embossed with a leather-like texture or grain. Color and patterning, if any, are a surface treatment that does not penetrate like a dyeing process would. The natural leather fiber content of bonded leather varies. The manufacturing process is somewhat similar to the production of paper.

Lower-quality materials may suffer flaking of the surface material in as little as a few years, while better varieties are considered very durable and retain their pattern and color even during commercial use. Because the composition of bonded leathers and related products varies considerably, and is sometimes a trade secret, it may be difficult to predict how a given product will perform over the course of time. There is a wide range in the longevity of bonded leathers and related products; some better-quality bonded leathers are claimed to be superior in durability over low-quality genuine leather.

== Applications ==
Bonded leather can be found in furniture, bookbinding, and various fashion accessories. Products that are commonly constructed with different varieties of bonded leather include book covers, cases and covers for personal electronics, shoe components, textile and accessory linings, portfolios and briefcases, handbags, belts, chairs, and sofas. A more fragile paper-backed bonded leather is typically used to cover books such as diaries and Bibles, and various types of desk accessories. These bonded leathers might contain a smaller proportion of leather than those used in the furniture industry, and have some leather exposed in the product's surface, producing the characteristic odor associated with leather.

These same applications can alternately use artificial leather constructed in a similar appearance to bonded leather.

== Advantages and disadvantages ==
Possible advantages of bonded leather include:

- Environmentally friendly – reuses leftover leather without need for extra farming and use of resources
- Product consistency – no natural defects and minimal batch to batch variation
- High cutting yield – cost efficient and reducing waste

Possible drawbacks include:

- Difficult or impossible to repair or recondition after wear or damage
- Outgassing and "sweating" of plasticizers and other chemicals from poorly formulated products
- Typically not as durable as genuine leather

== Labeling ==
The actual leather content of bonded leather varies depending on the manufacturer and the quality level.

There is some debate and controversy over the ethics of using the term "bonded leather" to describe an upholstery product, which is actually a reconstituted leather, specifically in the home furnishings industry. A Leather Research Laboratory commented calling a product "bonded leather" is "deceptive because it does not represent its true nature. It's a vinyl, or a polyurethane laminate or a composite, but it's not leather".

In 2011 the European Committee for Standardization published EN 15987:2011 'Leather - Terminology - Key definitions for the leather trade' to stop confusion about bonded leather, according to which the minimum amount of 50% in weight of dry leather is needed to use the term "bonded leather".

The US Federal Trade Commission recommends giving a percentage of leather included. The Federal Trade Commission has said that "The guidelines caution against misrepresentations about the leather content in products containing ground, reconstituted, or bonded leather, and state that such products, when they appear to be made of leather, should be accompanied by a disclosure as to the percentage of leather or other fiber content. The guidelines also state that these disclosures should be included in any product advertising that might otherwise mislead consumers as to the composition of the product."
