= Henry Rossiter Worthington =

American mechanical engineer, inventor and industrialist

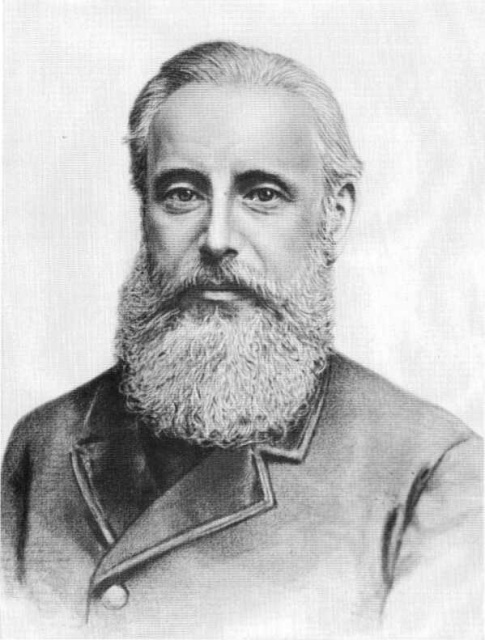
Henry Rossiter Worthington, at the age of 48.

Henry Rossiter Worthington (December 17, 1817—December 17, 1880) was an American mechanical engineer, inventor, industrialist and founder of the American Society of Mechanical Engineers in 1880.

Worthington had several inventions leading to the perfection of the direct steam pump (1845—55), patented the duplex steam pump (1859), and built the first duplex waterworks engine, widely adopted and used for more than 75 years. He established a pump manufacturing plant, New York City, in 1859.

== Biography ==
Born in New York City, Worthington was the eldest child of Frances (Meadowcraft) and Asa Worthington, an engineer and owner of the "Hope Flour Mills" and a man prominent in public affairs. He was a descendant in the sixth generation of Nicholas Worthington, who emigrated from England about 1650 and settled in Saybrook, Connecticut.

He founded the Henry R. Worthington Pump Works in 1845 in Brooklyn, and had a plant on Van Brunt Street, Red Hook, Brooklyn until 1904 when they moved their company to Harrison, New Jersey.

On 24 September 1839, Worthington married Sarah Newton of Alexandria, Virginia, the daughter of Commodore John Thomas Newton of Alexandria, Virginia. Six children were born to them, four boys and two girls. Charles C., born in 1854, was the youngest and the only one of the children to become actively interested in the family pump business.

At the time of his death, Worthington was survived by his widow, two sons, and two daughters.

== Work ==
=== Early interests ===
After being educated in the public schools of his native city, Worthington, who had shown early a decided bent for things mechanical, sought employment that enabled him to become a hydraulic engineer while still a very young man. He concentrated his attention on the problems of city water supply, became thoroughly familiar with steam engines and mechanical pumps, and engaged in experiments intended to improve these machines. Canal navigation interested him, too, and it was in this connection that he made his first invention. As early as 1840 he had an experimental steam canal boat in operation which was fairly successful except that when the boat was stopped it became necessary to resort to hand pump to keep the steam boiler supplied with water. To overcome this deficiency he invented an independent feeding pump which was automatic in its action and was controlled by the water level within the steam boiler (patent, September 7, 1840).

=== Pumping machinery ===
After pursuing his canal navigation experiments for four of five more years and obtaining a patent on February 2, 1844, for an improvement in the mode of propelling canal boats, he turned his attention again to pumping machinery and perfected a series of inventions between 1845 and 1855 which made him the first proposer and constructor of the direct steam pump (patent No. 13, 370).

In 1859, after establishing a pump-manufacturing plant in New York, he perfected his duplex steam feed pump (patent No. 24,838) and in the following year built the first water-works engine of this kind. In the duplex system one engine actuated the steam valves of the other, and a pause of the pistons at the end of the stroke permitted the water-valves to seat themselves quietly and preserve a uniform water pressure.

A distinct improvement on the Cornish engines used at the time, Worthington's pump embodied one of the most ingenious advances in engineering in the nineteenth century and its principle was widely applied. Because of their reliability and low operating cost, these pumps were greatly used thereafter in America for waterworks and for pumping oil through long pipe lines in the oil fields; they are still used (1936) for boiler feeding, tank and ballast pumping, and for hydraulic-press work.

Worthington also originated a pumping engine that used no flywheel to carry the piston past the dead point at the end of the stroke. He devised, too, a number of instruments of precision, as well as machine tools which in themselves entitled him to a high place in his profession. In addition to directing his pump-manufacturing plant, which employed over two hundred men, he was president of the Nason Manufacturing Company in New York.

Worthington was a founder of the American Society of Mechanical Engineers (ASME), acting as the Society's first vice-president, and was a member of other technical societies. In 1880, the ASME elected him an honorary member.

== Bibliography ==
- ASME History and Heritage (1980). Mechanical Engineers in America Born Prior to 1861: A Biographical Dictionary. New York: ASME. LCCN 79-57364. OCLC 6579756.
- Dictionary of American Biography, Volume XX, Werden - Zuner, Page 539
- 100 Years of Worthington, (c) 1940 by the Worthington Pump & Machinery Corp.
