= Kathy Ruttenberg =

American artist

Kathy Ruttenberg is an American artist based in New York's Hudson Valley. Originally a painter, she is known for her ceramic sculptures of a "wonder world in which species merge and figures serve as landscapes." Her work is primarily concerned with the figure, the natural world, and human relationships.

To date, Ruttenberg has had more than thirty-five solo shows and her work has been included in more than a hundred group shows. Her sculptures have been acquired by the Mamirauá Sustainable Development Reserve in Amazonas, Brazil, the Tisch Children's Zoo in Central Park in New York City, and the permanent collection of the Museo Internazionale delle Cermiche, as well as by private collectors.

Her work has been featured in a variety of major publications including: The New York Times, New York Magazine, American Craft Magazine, Neue Keramik, Clay Times, Ceramics Monthly, New York Daily News, Avenue, and Ceramics Art and Perception

== Early life and education ==
Ruttenberg was born in Chicago, Illinois, where she lived until her family moved to New York City. She received her BFA with Honors from School of Visual Arts in 1981, majoring in animation and painting while also working with a variety of other mediums. In 1980, her hand-drawn animated film won an honorable mention in the Varna International Film Festival. She continued her education with graduate courses from New York University in Italy and School of Visual Arts in Morocco. In 1992, she relocated to Woodstock, New York, where she has been living and working ever since.

== Work ==
Ruttenberg's work is both figurative and biographical, and makes use of symbols and story telling to convey meaning. Her work expresses a distinctly feminine perspective, with mostly women as main characters and masculine characters depicted in complex but usually secondary roles. Thematically, the natural world and our relationship to it underpin her work and feature broadly in her narratives. Of her process, Ruttenberg says, "I resolve my life's issues through expression in my work ... I think the cocktail of strong emotions and fantasy can take one's creativity to deep and unchartered [sic] territory. With the clay and the watercolour, the two mediums I am now most drawn to, I have found a very easy channel to express ... mythical story telling."

== Reviews and commentary ==
A force to contend with as a narrator and symbolist, a form maker and colorist. Coating sexual tensions with a storybook innocence, she works in a triangle bordered by Louise Bourgeois, Viola Frey and Beatrix Potter. Her blunt figurative style relates to those of Stephan Balkenhol, Claudette Schreuders, Alison Saar, Kiki Smith and, in a way, David Altmejd. She also draws on the centuries-old tradition of porcelain figurines while studiously ignoring all boundaries, especially those dividing insider and outsider; art and craft; and high, low and kitsch.

— Roberta Smith, The New York Times

Her sculptures explore the human-animal boundary, possessing the stately elegance of Proust, as well as the winsome immeadiacy of an indie-pop song—simultaneously solid and slight, rooted down and taking flight.

— American Craft Magazine

The innocence of ceramic figurines disarms viewers and purges their preconceptions to intensify the effects of absurd, visceral visions of, for example, a woman giving birth to a pony whilst lying in her loverʼs frozen arms. The stylized woodland immediately transports her scenes to the realm of fantasy and fairytales, where innocence can be, curiously, both lost and gained as nature absorbs her charactersʼ bodies in brutally whimsical ways. Suspended in a magical world without history and away from political discourse, Ruttenbergʼs works urge us to consider gender rhetoric and feminism in the context of corporeal consciousness and pure imagination. Simultaneously, her earthbound materials and fastidious sensitivity to texture and color interrupt this reverie to render her mise-en-scénes conspicuously tangible and real.

— Wall Street International

Ruttenberg's innovative, imaginative, narrative feminist sculpture—materially as well as conceptually innovative—are perhaps the most creative, certainly unusual, ceramic art being made today.

— Donald Kuspit, Kathy Ruttenberg: In the Female Unconscious

== Personal life ==
Ruttenberg's residence and studio is also home to her animals. A feature in American Craft Magazine states, "On the grounds of Ruttenberg's home are more than fifty rescued animals, from dogs and cats to turkeys and horses. It's a private zoo that functions as a source of artistic inspiration, as well as an animal haven."

In Julien's Journal, she stated, "The anthropomorphic side to my work comes from not just seeing them out in the woods, but having contact with animals every day, feeding them and taking care of them."

Ruttenberg has donated her designs, products, and artworks to benefit Green Chimneys (a Brewster-based nonprofit that uses animals to help special-needs children), the Wildlife Conservation Society (WCS), the Lewa Wildlife Conservancy, the Lemur Conservation Foundation, and the Woodstock Land Conservancy.
