= Piñatex =

Pineapple-based vegetable leather

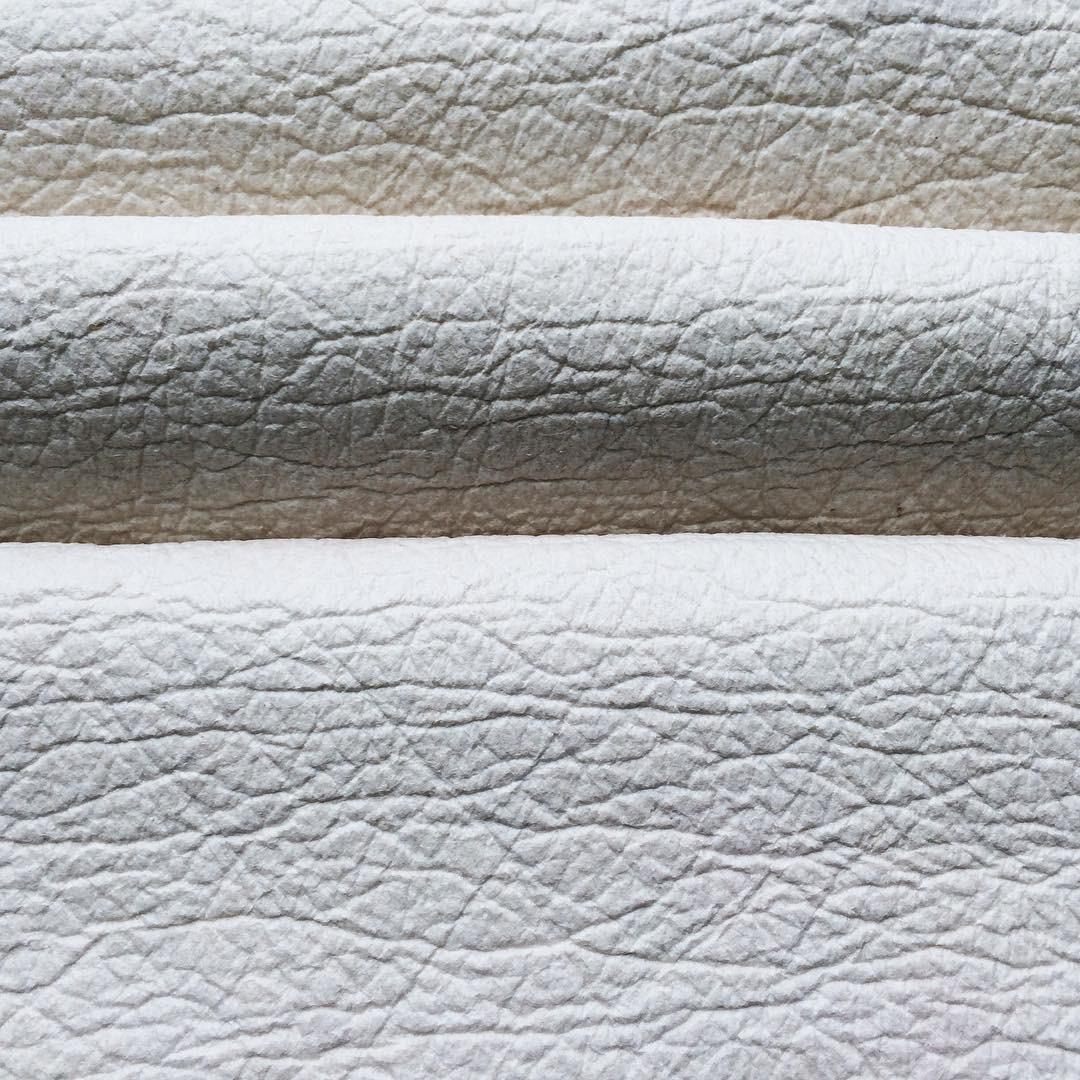
- Piñatex fabric in white
- Type: Fabric
- Material: Pineapple leaf fiber and PLA resin
- Production method: Felting
- Production process: Mechanized
- Introduced: 2015
- Manufacturer: Ananas Anam

Piñatex (Spanish pronunciation: [piɲaˈteks]) is the trade name for a non-biodegradable leather alternative made from cellulose fibres extracted from pineapple leaves, PLA (polylactic acid), and petroleum-based resin. Piñatex was developed by Carmen Hijosa and first presented at the PhD graduate exhibition at the Royal College of Art, London. Piñatex is manufactured and distributed by Hijosa's company Ananas Anam Ltd.

== Development ==
Piñatex's development began when Hijosa was working as consultant in the leather goods industry in the Philippines in the 1990s. She observed the leather produced there was poor quality, environmentally unsustainable and involved a hazardous production process for those working in the industry. Hijosa was inspired by the barong tagalog, a traditional Philippine garment worn untucked over an undershirt and made of pineapple fibers. She then spent seven years developing the product through a PhD at the Royal College of Art in London, and joint collaborations with Bangor University in Wales, Northampton Leather Technology Center, Leitat Technological Centre in Spain, alongside NonWoven Philippines Inc. in Manila, and Bonditex S.A., a textile finishing company in Spain.

== Production ==
Piñatex is created by felting the long fibres from pineapple leaves together to create a non-woven substrate, with the addition of PLA (polylactic acid), a vegetable-based plastic material derived from cornstarch, resulting in a base material of 80% pineapple leaf fibre and 20% PLA. The material is then coated with a petroleum-based resin.

The production process uses waste pineapple leaves, as the pineapple industry globally produces 40,000 tonnes of waste leaves each year, which are usually left to rot or are burned. Approximately 480 leaves (the waste from 16 pineapple plants) are needed to create 1 square metre (11 sq ft) of material. The material uses the long leaf fibres which are separated by the pineapple farmers for additional income, the leftover biomass from the process can be used as a fertiliser. The production of Piñatex uses no additional water, pesticides or fertilizers, and avoids the use of heavy metallic salts used in the production of chrome-tanned leather.

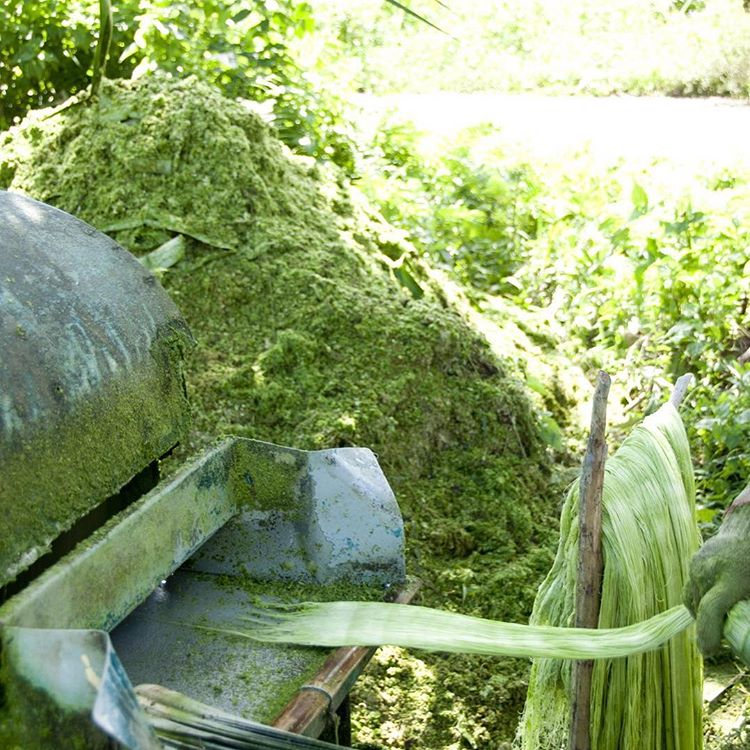
Decorticating pineapple leaves

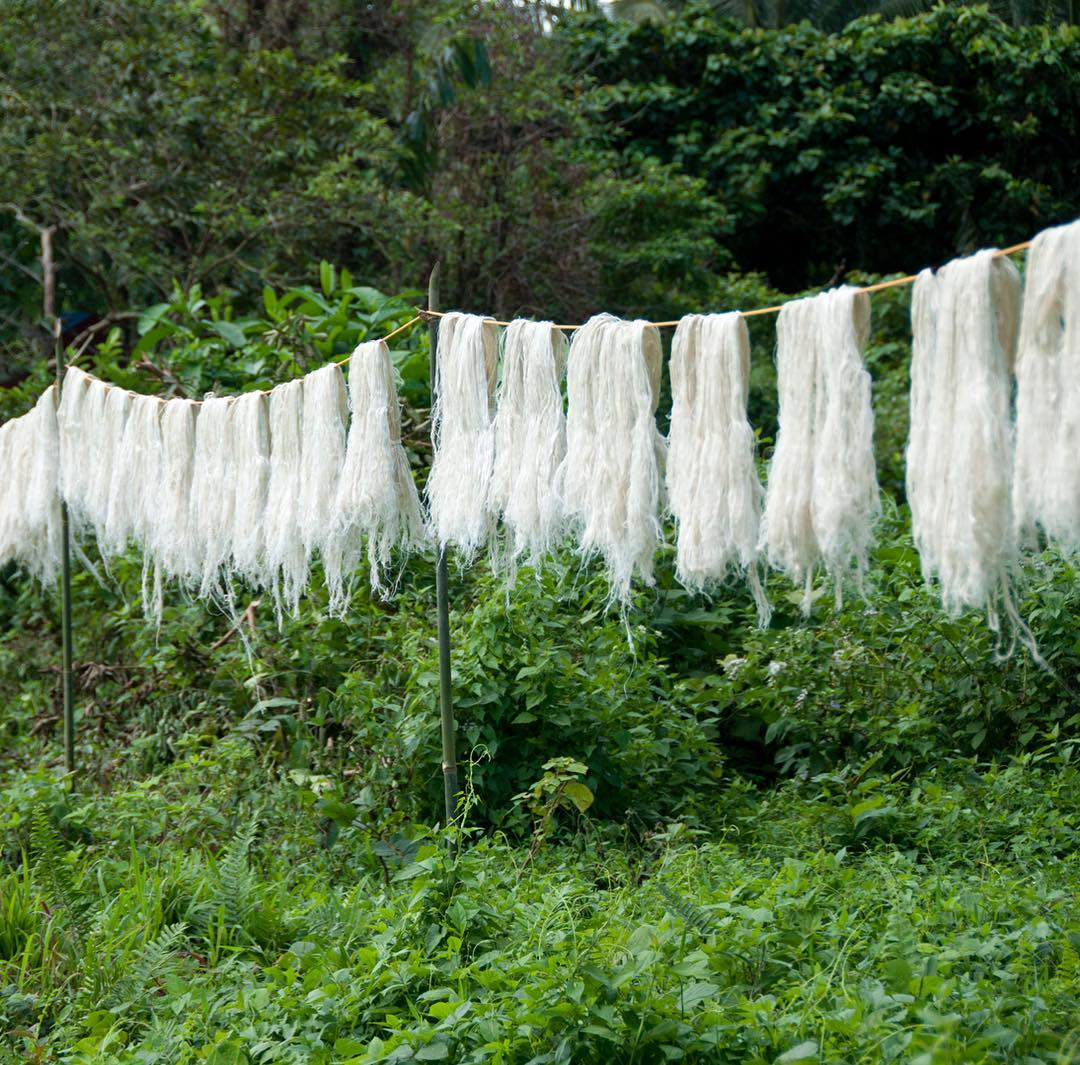
After the fibre is decorticated and washed, the farmers hang it up to dry

== Properties ==
Piñatex is produced in a range of colours and finishes, including a textured surface and a metallic finish. It has been described as having a softer, more pliable, "leather-like" texture than other synthetic leathers. It can also be cut, stitched, embossed and embroidered for different design uses. Because the substrate of Piñatex is 80% pineapple fibres and 20% PLA, it is not biodegradable.

== Sustainability ==
Piñatex is not biodegradable. It is composed of a mixture of pineapple leaves, PLA (Polylactic acid), and petroleum-based resins. PLA, also known as bioplastic, is sourced from renewable resources and is commonly labeled 'biodegradable'. However, the United Nations Environmental Programme issued a report in 2015 concluding, "The adoption of plastic products labelled as 'biodegradable' will not bring about a significant decrease either in the quantity of plastic entering the ocean or the risk of physical and chemical impacts on the marine environment, on the balance of current scientific evidence."

== In manufactured goods ==
Piñatex has been used in the manufacture of products such as bags, shoes, wallets, watch bands, and seat covers, and is being further developed for use in clothing. Products have been produced by designer Ally Capellino, LIAN & LIV, Time IV Change, ROMBAUT, and Nae; prototypes have been created by Puma and Camper. Bourgeois Boheme, a vegan footwear label, uses Piñatex in their sandals.

== Recognition ==
In 2016, Piñatex won the Arts Foundation UK award for Material Innovation and in 2015 Dr Hijosa was finalists of the Cartier Women's Initiative Awards. Piñatex is a PETA-certified vegan fashion label.

== Insolvency ==
In October 2025, Ananas Amam entered into administration in the UK and Spain.
