= Randolph H. Guthrie =

American lawyer and businessman (1905–89)

- Guthrie from The Sunday Press, Binghamton, N.Y. 14 July 1968
- Born: 1905; Richmond, Virginia
- Died: September 11, 1989 (aged 83–84); Hilton Head, South Carolina
- Occupations: Lawyer, businessman
- Known for: Chairman of Studebaker

Randolph H. Guthrie (1905 – September 11, 1989) was an American lawyer and businessman who became the chairman of the Studebaker corporation.

== Early life and education ==
Guthrie was born in Richmond, Virginia. He attended The Citadel, The Military College of South Carolina, and then Harvard Law School, graduating magna cum laude.

== Career ==
In 1931, he joined the New York law form of Mudge, Rose. In 1958, Guthrie was a senior partner in Mudge, Steen, Baldwin and Todd, the legal counsel in the United States for Daimler Benz. In October that year he was elected to the board of Studebaker. When Richard Nixon lost his bid for election as governor of California in 1962, he re-joined Mudge, Rose, Guthrie and Alexander. Of the partners, he is said to have felt closest to Guthrie. John N. Mitchell was another partner in the law firm, to be appointed United States Attorney General by Nixon after he was elected president in 1968.

By 1963, Studebaker's automobile division was struggling. Guthrie was elected chairman of the board. At the August 8, 1963 board meeting he recommended that the board start planning on the assumption that Studebaker was going to stop manufacturing cars. Studebaker merged with Worthington Corporation on November 27, 1967. Guthrie became chairman of Studebaker-Worthington. Guthrie was chairman of the board until 1971.

From 1969 to 1977 Guthrie was chairman of the board of UMC Industries, which manufactured money-changing equipment. In June 1970, Guthrie was invited to represent Penn Central, then on the brink of bankruptcy and looking for government assistance. It was hoped that he could use his influence with Nixon. However John A. Volpe, Secretary of Transportation, insisted that the railroad dismiss Guthrie due to the political risk if the tie to Nixon became public.

Guthrie later became a senior partner of Mudge, Rose, Guthrie, Alexander & Ferdon.

== Personal life ==
He died at home in Hilton Head, South Carolina of a heart attack on September 11, 1989, aged 83. His son, Randolph "Bob" Guthrie, became a plastic surgeon, and was one of the two inventors of the standard procedure for reconstructive breast surgery.
