= Worthington Corporation =

American machinery manufacturer

- The Worthington "Flying W" logo
- Industry: Manufacturing
- Founded: 1845
- Founder: Henry Rossiter Worthington
- Defunct: 1967
- Fate: Merged
- Successor: Studebaker-Worthington
- Headquarters: United States

The Worthington Corporation was a diversified American manufacturer that had its roots in Worthington and Baker, a steam pump manufacturer founded in 1845. In 1967 it merged with Studebaker and Wagner Electric to form Studebaker-Worthington. This company was in turn acquired by McGraw-Edison in 1979.

== Worthington Pump Works (1845–1899) ==
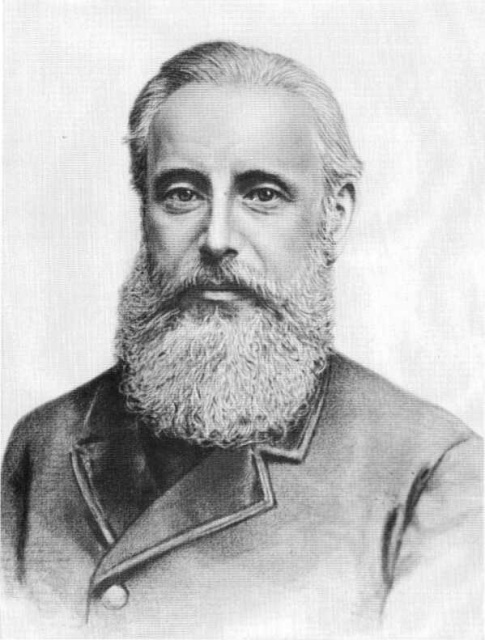
Henry Rossiter Worthington, at the age of 48

Worthington and Baker, manufacturers of hydraulic machinery such as steam pumps and meters, was founded by Henry R Worthington and William H. Baker. Worthington was the inventor of the direct acting steam pump. The first foundry was near the Brooklyn Navy Yard. In 1854 the partners moved to Van Brunt Street in Brooklyn. The partnership was dissolved around 1860 when Baker died. A new partnership called Henry R. Worthington, or Worthington Hydraulic Pump Works, was formed in 1862.

The United States Navy used Worthington pumps to pump boiler feed water, bilge water, and water for fire fighting and general services aboard various ships during the American Civil War, including the USS Monitor. After Henry Worthington died in 1880 he was succeeded by his son Charles Campbell Worthington (1854–1944). While head of the company, Worthington contributed many useful improvements to pumps, compressors, and other machines. The company moved from Brooklyn to Harrison, New Jersey in 1904.

In 1885 the Worthington Pumping Engine Company, representatives of Worthington pumps of the US, obtained an order from the British Army to deliver ten high-pressure pumps to deliver water needed by the British Expeditionary army coming to the aid of General Gordon in Khartoum, Sudan.

The British pump suppliers could not deliver the pumps fast enough. The British company James Simpson & Co. learned of the Worthington company because of this order, and on 13 December 1885 signed an agreement with the Worthington Pumping Engine Company under which they gained exclusive manufacturing rights for Worthington pumps in Britain. The British company's pumps were sold in the English and Colonial markets. (Note: 1903 the London-based James Simpson and Worthington Pumping Engine Company companies merged to become the Worthington Pump Co. The merger applied to the London-based Worthington Pumping Engine Company. The American parent remained independent.)

== International Steam Pump Company (1899–1916) ==
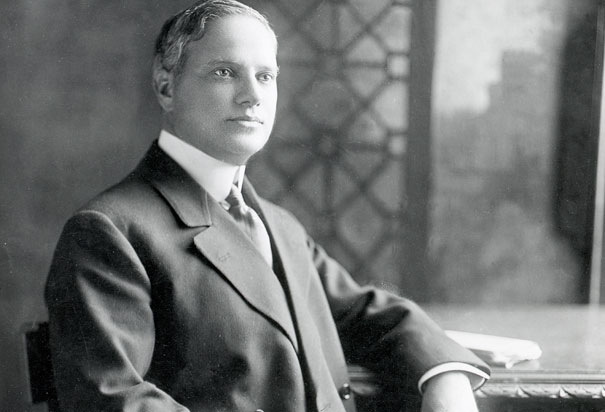
Benjamin Guggenheim

Benjamin Guggenheim was a member of a family that had made a fortune in the smelting business in the United States, largely through his efforts, and that controlled the American Smelting and Refining Company. Guggenheim founded the International Steam Pump Company (ISPC). The ISPC was organized by the Seward legal firm in 1899. Lehman Brothers were the bankers.

The ISPC merged Blake and Knowles Steam Pump Works, Ltd. (BKSPW), Worthington Pump Works and other companies that together made up a large part of total American capacity for making steam pumps. The company's products were diverse, including the elevators for the Eiffel Tower. Worthington Pump Works was the largest of the merged firms. Charles Campbell Worthington was president of the company until he retired in 1900. Guggenheim became president of the ISPC. The ISPC soon ran into financial difficulties, and Guggenheim invested increasing amounts of capital to keep it afloat.

BKSPW had been registered in England in 1890 with a capital of £300,000 to purchase in full the George F. Blake Manufacturing Company and the Knowles Steam Pump Works, with three plants in the United States. In its 1901 Annual Report the ISPC reported holding £200,000 of ordinary shares in BKSPW. The George F. Blake Manufacturing Company, an ISPC subsidiary, had liabilities that included $1 million of mortgage bonds and $500,000 of preferred stock of BKSPW. The ISPC 1904 Annual Report noted that BKSPW had been dissolved in 1903, replaced by a company with the same name based in New Jersey. An October 1908 description of the Blake-Knowles Steam Pump Works in Cambridge, Massachusetts, part of the International Steam Pump Company, said it was the second largest of its kind in the United States, employing more than 1,700 men.

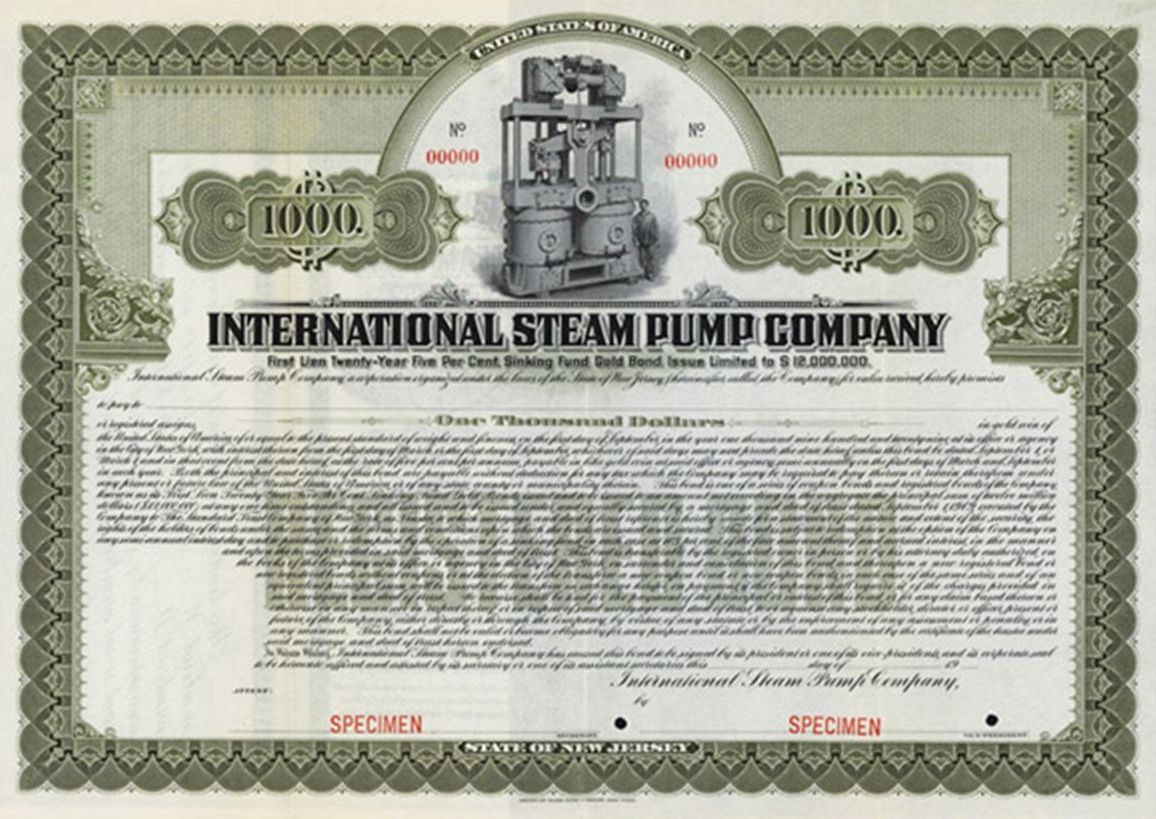
Specimen 1909 $1,000 bond issued by the International Steam Pump Company of New Jersey

In 1903 Guggenheim founded a factory in Milwaukee to manufacture mining machinery. In 1906 it was merged into the ISPC. By 1909 the ISPC as a whole was employing 10,000 men. In May 1910 Benjamin Guggenheim reported strong results with net earnings of about $2 million and profits of about $700,000. The company had purchased the JeanesvilIe Iron Works Company and had obtained a controlling interest in the Denver Rock Drill and Machinery Company, adding at least 30% to capacity. The Holly Manufacturing Company (1859–1912) was acquired in 1912.

Guggenheim was a passenger on RMS Titanic and died on 15 April 1912 when the ship sank. The International Steam Pump Company went into receivership in 1914. A plan of reorganization was issued on 5 August 1915 and under this plan the firm was reorganized in 1916 as the Worthington Pump & Machinery Corporation.

== Worthington Pump and Machinery Corporation (1916–1952) ==
The winged sun logo used on Worthington products, circa 1925-1950

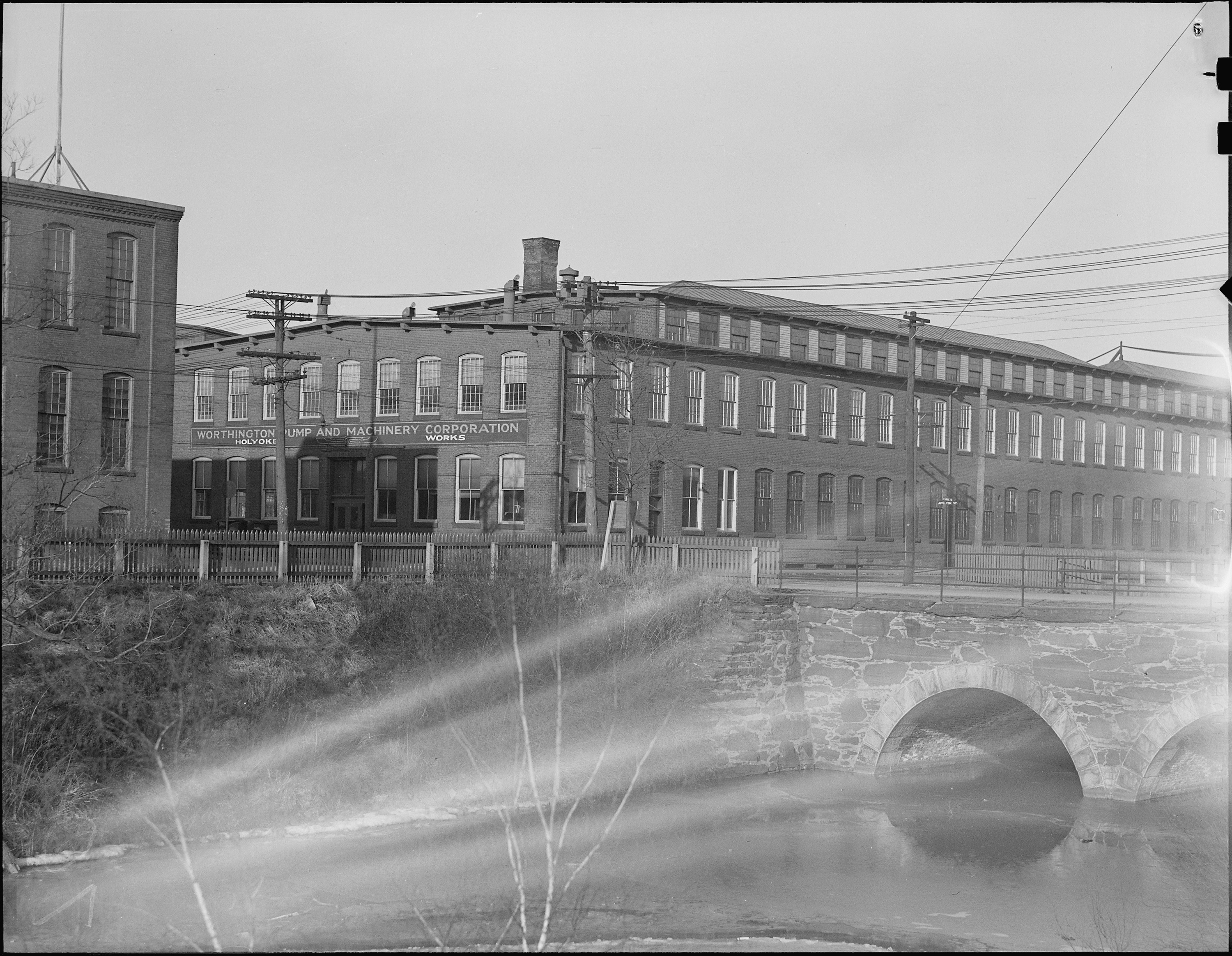
Worthington Pump and Machinery Corporation in Holyoke, Massachusetts (1937)

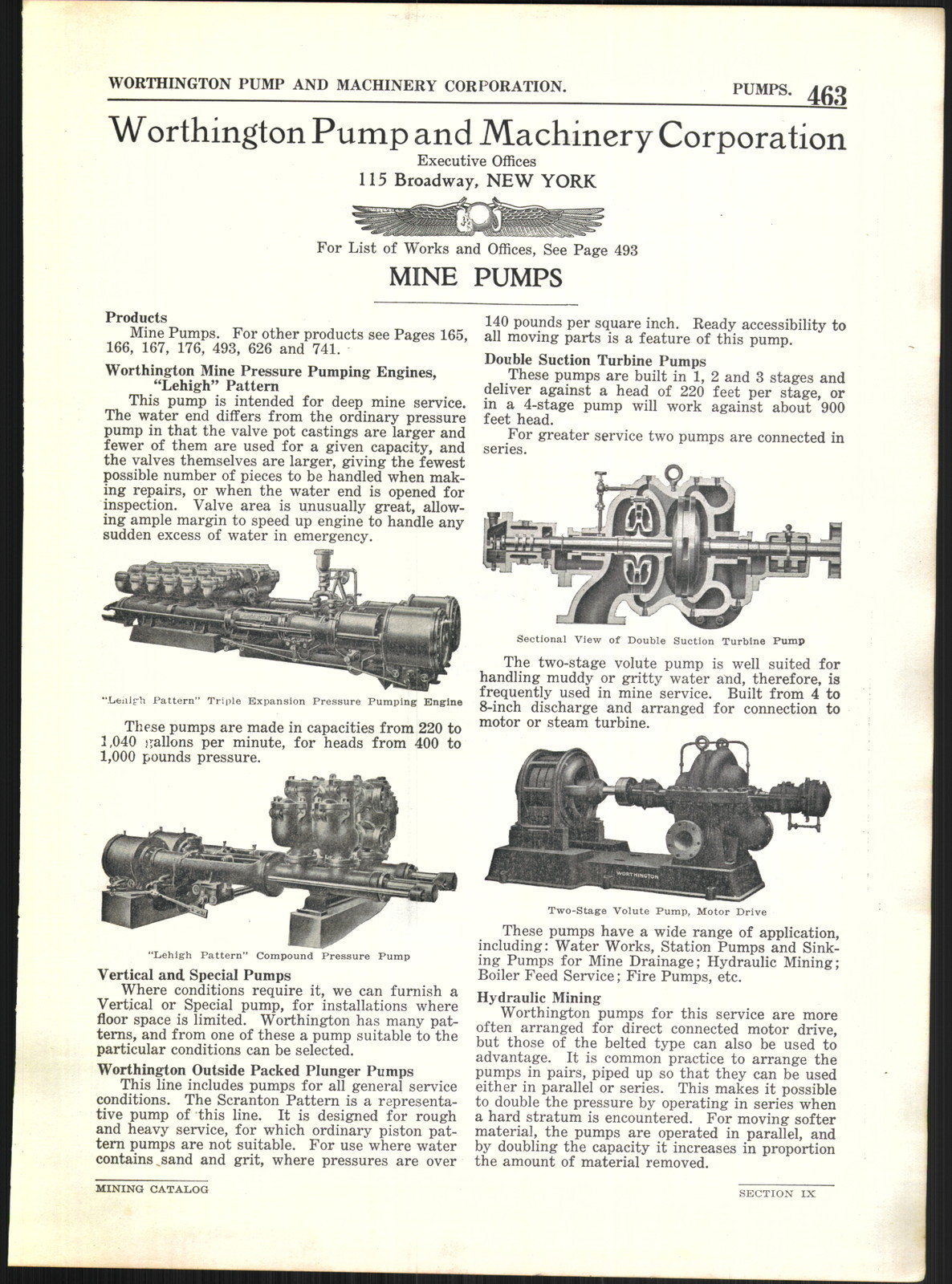
1922 advertisement for mine pumps from the Worthington Pump and Machinery Corporation

The Worthington Pump and Machinery Corporation had subsidiaries in Atlanta, Georgia , Buffalo, New York, Holyoke, Massachusetts, Cincinnati, Ohio and London, England. In 1917 the independent but associated British Worthington Pump Co. changed its name to Worthington Simpson. The Worthington Pump and Machinery Corporation purchased a stake in Worthington-Simpson in 1933.

== Worthington Corporation (1952–1967) ==
In 1952 the company became the Worthington Corporation. As of 1956 the Worthington Corporation had laboratories in Harrison, Holyoke, and Buffalo. The labs employed five chemists, forty engineers, four mathematicians, four metallurgists, two physicists and thirty five others. They conducted research into hydrodynamics, thermodynamics, mechanics and materials.

In 1964 Worthington purchased the American Locomotive Company (Alco).

== Merger with Studebaker (1967) ==
In 1967 a merger with Studebaker was arranged by the entrepreneur Derald Ruttenberg. He took the risk of buying Studebaker despite the liabilities that came with it, including dealer warranties and union agreements. He saw that Onan generators and STP engine additives were healthy businesses. The large tax loss was also valuable. Worthington was expected to continue to earn steady profits, but could use the tax loss to avoid paying taxes. The stockholders of Studebaker and Worthington approved the merger despite rumors that the Federal Trade Commission considered the merger would be "substantially anti-competitive". Studebaker was acquired by Wagner Electric, which in turn was merged with Worthington Corporation to create Studebaker-Worthington.

The merger was completed in November 1967, creating a company with $550 million of assets. The former chairman of Worthington, Frank J. Nunlist, was appointed president and chief executive officer. Randolph Guthrie of Studebaker was chairman of the new company.

McGraw-Edison purchased Studebaker-Worthington in 1978. McGraw-Edison was in turn acquired by Cooper Industries in 1985.
