= Fedders =

American company that manufactures air conditioners

Fedders Air Conditioning
- Founded: 1896
- Headquarters: Somerset County, New Jersey

Fedders is an American company that manufactures air conditioners and other air treatment products. Founded by Theodore Fedders in 1896, Fedders is headquartered in the Basking Ridge section of Bernards Township in Somerset County, New Jersey, United States.

A Fedders air conditioning unit

Fedders was founded in 1896 by Theodore Fedder as a producer of milk cans, bread pans and kerosene tanks. The company began manufacturing room air conditioners in 1946. Fedders purchased Airtemp from Chrysler in 1976. Fedders also purchased the General Electric room air conditioner and rotary compressor plant in Columbia, Tennessee in 1987.

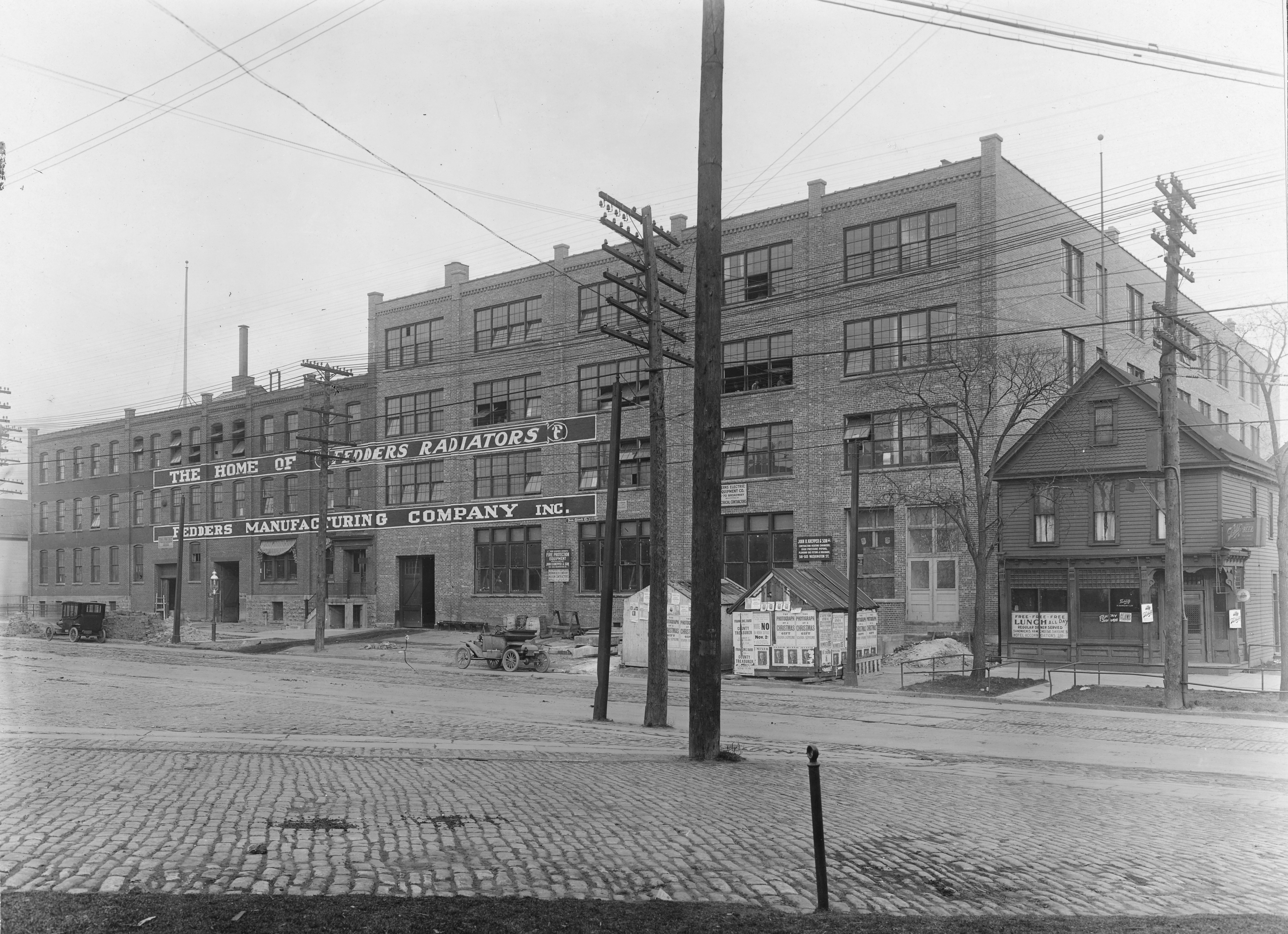
Fedders factory in Buffalo, New York. Photo taken circa 1918

Fedders Quigan Corp., an American company, owns the Fedders trademark in the United States.
