= Pantasote =

Type of artificial leather

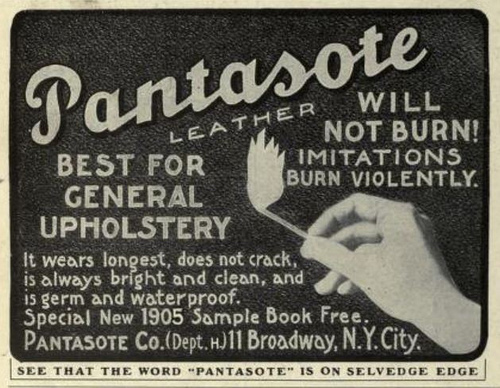
Pantasote Co. advertisement

Pantasote is an imitation leather material made by the Pantasote Company, beginning in 1891. It was a durable, relatively inexpensive material for upholstery, tents, and awnings.
