= Wagner Electric =

American electric equipment company

Wagner Electric Corporation
- Industry: Automotive
- Founded: 1891; 135 years ago
- Founder: Herbert Appleton Wagner; Ferdinand Schwedtmann
- Defunct: 1967
- Fate: Merged into Studebaker-Worthington
- Headquarters: St. Louis, Wellston, Missouri

Wagner Electric Corporation was an electric equipment manufacturing firm established in 1891 that became part of Studebaker-Worthington in 1967.

== History ==
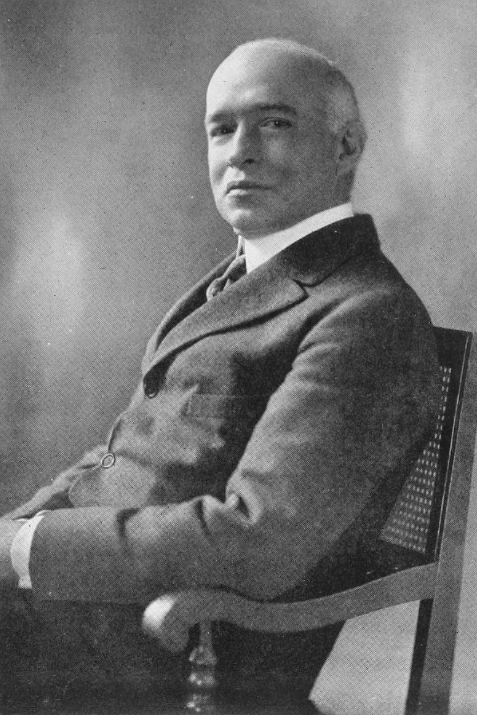
Herbert Appleton Wagner

Wagner Electric Corporation was founded by Herbert Appleton Wagner and Ferdinand Schwedtmann (aka Francis Charles Schwedtman) in 1891 in Downtown St. Louis. The company manufactured electric engines, electric motors and electric starters for early automobiles. They also made electric lights and many other electric-related products.

In 1906, the company expanded operations to Wellston, Missouri, contributing to the development of workers' housing in the comparably low population suburb. In 1909, Wagner Electric started manufacturing their first automotive headlamp bulbs.

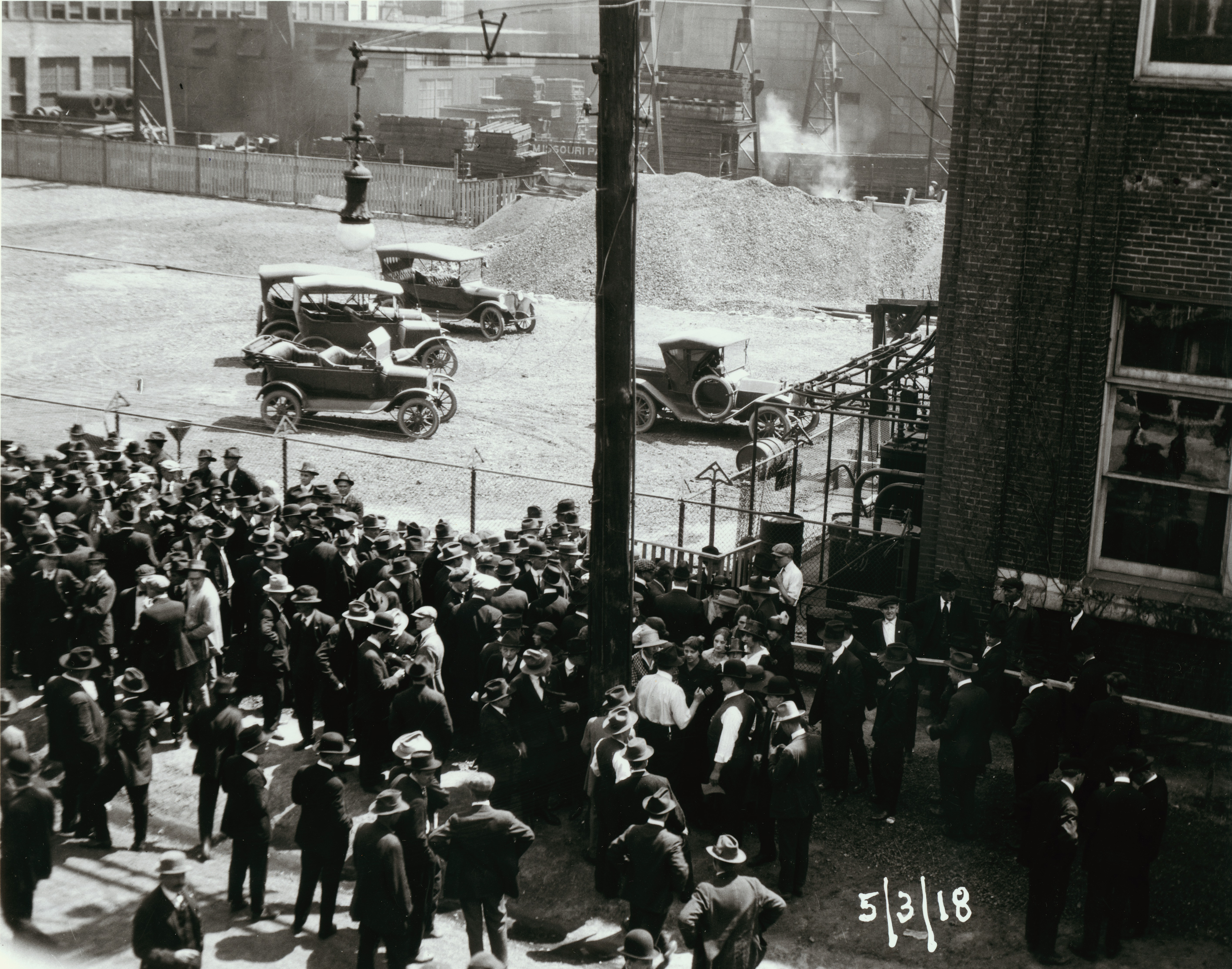
Wagner Electric Company Strike, May 3, 1918

The International Association of Machinists held a strike at the Wagner Electric Company in St. Louis, Missouri from June 4 to October 7, 1918.

Before it became part of a conglomerate, Wagner had three main divisions. It had the automotive division where it made brake parts and systems for autos and trucks. It had the motor division which made small and large electric motors and it had the transformer division where it manufactured small and medium power transformers plus liquid-immersed distribution transformers. The transformer division ended up as part of the Cooper Power Systems division.

In 1967 Wagner Electric was merged with Studebaker and Worthington Corporation to create Studebaker-Worthington, a diversified American manufacturer. The combined company included profitable divisions from Studebaker such as Onan generators and STP engine additives, brake and electrical automobile component manufacturing from Wagner Electric, and diverse operations from Worthington that included manufacture of construction equipment, valves and power generation plant.

== Environmental impact ==
In 1968 and 1969, the International Union of Electrical, Radio and Machine Workers raised concerns with elected officials about improper disposal of oil discharges directly into River des Peres, later found to contain PCBs. In 1984, the EPA fined Wagner $84,000 for improper storage of transformer oil.

In 1983, St. Louis County Executive Gene McNary gave Wagner a $3 million tax write off in exchange for the donation of the abandoned plant in Wellston without inspection of the site. Following the transfer, extensive issues related to toxic substance disposal were found across the grounds and the river banks. It was categorized as a "less dangerous" superfund site. Wagner refused to pay for remediation based on the donation agreement, but after ensuing lawsuits the new ownership company Cooper Industries came to settlement for $2 million in 1987. Resulting negotiations led to a partial clean up and EPA restrictions on reuse.

Historian Andrew Hurley describes the Wagner legacy in Wellston as a case study for environmental racism and the intersection of racial segregation in the United States, resulting in prospective African American homeowners being steered into polluted environments and kept unaware of the surrounding toxins even during inspections and litigations. Wellston mayor Robert Powell observed the difference in EPA response from nearby Times Beach, Missouri, saying that if similar conditions were found in nearby white communities, it "would have been taken care of."

== Wagner brands today ==
Today Wagner is a brand owned by DRiV Incorporated. Under the name Wagner Lighting Products, some of their brands include TruView, BriteLite, HalogenGold and LazerBlue. They also make brake pads and brake rotors under the name Wagner Brake Products.
